= Ellen Simonetti =

American former flight attendant

- Born: December 15, 1974 (age 51); North Carolina, U.S.
- Education: University of Texas at Austin (BA)
- Occupation: Flight attendant (former)

Ellen Simonetti (born December 15, 1974, North Carolina) is an American former flight attendant who was fired after documenting her life and work experiences on a blog in the early 2000s.

== Early life and airline career ==
Simonetti, one of three siblings, was raised in Durham and Raleigh, North Carolina. She spent a year in Bern, Switzerland as a high school exchange student, later dropping out of high school to become first a travel agent and then a flight attendant. She was first employed in the flight industry in 1996 with a charter airline based in Miami, Florida.

After the charter went out of business, Simonetti was hired by Delta Air Lines. During her eight years with Delta, she flew German, Spanish, and Italian routes with the airline and completed her Bachelor of Arts degree in Spanish at the University of Texas at Austin.

== Blog and dismissal ==
Simonetti began her "Queen of Sky: Diary of a Dysfunctional Flight Attendant" blog in September 2003 as a form of therapy after the loss of her mother to cancer. In addition to describing events of her life, Simonetti also described travel abroad, mainly Europe and South America, while working for Delta Air Lines. Simonetti adopted the pen name "Queen of Sky" for her blog. With practical information on worldwide travel described in a quirky, irreverent tone, the blog developed a considerable following.

In late 2004, Simonetti was suspended and then fired after Delta Air Lines objected to Ellen posing for photographs on a company airplane and commentary on her blog. Simonetti subsequently renamed her blog "Diary of a Fired Flight Attendant." Although Simonetti never mentioned Delta Air Lines by name, the photos of her in uniform and the cabin clearly indicated the airline that she worked for. In addition, some of the photos on her blog were deemed "inappropriate", including one photo where she was stretched across seat headrests with her skirt "somewhat hiked", and another where her Delta uniform blouse was partly unbuttoned to reveal a glimpse of her bra.

== Employers and bloggers ==
These events became emblematic of the issue of employees' rights to communicate their own views of their work and workplace versus employers' rights to restrict them. There was considerable media coverage of Simonetti's firing and the freedom of expression issues involved.

Simonetti advocates that:

1. employers should have clear, unambiguous blogging policies so that employees can foresee the potential for disciplinary action, and
2. the penalty for a first offense should be a formal warning rather than dismissal.

Other individuals who have been fired for content in their personal blogs include Heather Armstrong, Jessica Cutler, Catherine Sanderson, Christine Axsmith, and Jan Pronk, United Nations Special Representative for Sudan, who was given three days notice to leave Sudan after the Sudanese army demanded his deportation for comments in his weblog.

== Aftermath ==
In 2005, Simonetti filed a lawsuit against Delta (Simonetti v. Delta Air Lines Inc., No. 5-cv-2321 (N.D. Ga. 2005)), alleging, inter alia, sex discrimination and retaliation. After much media attention and legal maneuvering between sides, the case was eventually settled out of court for an undisclosed sum. (Simonetti, though prohibited from disclosing the amount of her settlement, stated that it would be enough for her to attend culinary school, which she stated in her book ran to about $40,000.)

Simonetti has discussed personal blogging rights on The Montel Williams Show and the Larry Elder show. She set up a Bloggers Rights petition and was a founding member of the Committee to Protect Bloggers.

Simonetti has written articles for the news media including The New York Times and CNET, adapted her blog to a published book, and has worked in real estate.

On her website she says that although she has kept her real estate licence, she is not using this and has "...gone back to school at the University of Texas (undergrad), where I'm currently a journalism major, but soon to be an RTF (radio/TV/film) major". On her blog, she claimed that a film company is to make a film about her life and she has agreed to this.

In December 2008, the host of her blog, Journalspace, lost all their database data effectively ending the blog. No backup of Journalspace's contents exists. Simonetti then had a new blog entitled The Queen of the Screen.
