= IsraelPolitik =

IsraelPolitik is an official blog of the Consulate General of Israel in New York, and the second blog to be administered by the Israeli Consulate's media and public affairs team. It was initiated by David Saranga, Consul for Media and Public Affairs, following the launch of isRealli, which was the first official blog to ever be created by a government. IsraelPolitik covers political news in Israel by posting up-to-date news clips, official briefs, and exclusive articles and interviews. The site was launched on May 18, 2007, and is maintained on a frequent basis.

== Public Diplomacy 2.0 and IsraelPolitik ==
IsraelPolitik is one of the tools Israel's Ministry of Foreign Affairs and Consulate in New York are using in order to reach new audiences. In an interview with the New York Times during the war in Gaza in January 2009, Consul David Saranga at the Israeli Consulate in New York was quoted saying: “Since the definition of war has changed, the definition of public diplomacy has to change as well.”

== IsraelPolitik on Twitter ==
The blog garnered a slew of high-profile media attention and coverage during the war in Gaza from December 2008 to January 2009, when the Israeli Consulate in New York conducted the first-ever citizen press conference on Twitter, and posted the transcript on IsraelPolitik. The Twitter press conference, initiated by Consul David Saranga, was designed to answer people's questions about Operation Cast Lead in a series of brief “tweets”, as part of a new media effort to reach tech-savvy audiences.

== Categories ==
IsraelPolitik categories include: Citizen Press Conference, Conflict, International, Interviews, Media, Middle East, Operation Cast Lead, Peace, Politics, and Terrorism.

== Demographic ==
IsraelPolitik attracts users from more than 85 countries from across the globe, including Canada, United Kingdom, Germany, Australia, France, Iran, Egypt, Indonesia, United Arab Emirates, and many more.
