= Jarmon =

Jarmon is a surname. Notable people with the surname include:

- Donald Jarmon (1914–1952), American baseball player
- Jeremy Jarmon (born 1987), American football player
- Maelyn Jarmon (born 1992), American singer
- Tara Jarmon, Canadian fashion designer

== See also ==
- Garmon (surname)
- Harmon (name)
- Jarman, surname
- Jarmond, surname
