= Blogger's Code of Conduct =

Proposal by Tim O'Reilly for bloggers

The Blogger's Code of Conduct was a proposal by Tim O'Reilly for bloggers to adopt a uniform policy for moderation of comments. It was proposed in 2007, in response to controversy involving threats made to blogger Kathy Sierra. The idea of the code was first reported by BBC News, who quoted O'Reilly saying, "I do think we need some code of conduct around what is acceptable behaviour, I would hope that it doesn't come through any kind of regulation it would come through self-regulation."

In Ireland, a proposal for a code was raised in an article in Sunday Business Post in 2009 by Simon Palmer, a radio presenter and PR consultant in Dublin, after false details in relation to a client had appeared on Irish blogs Time To Raise Above Blog Standard. After his comments he was subjected to sustained on line abuse from Irish bloggers and anonymous trolls and even received death threats.

In Nepal, 10 prominent bloggers signed a Code of Ethics for Bloggers, first proposed by Ujjwal Acharya and finalized after discussion among bloggers, on July 27, 2011.

According to The New York Times, O'Reilly and others based their preliminary list on one developed by the BlogHer women's blogging support network and, working with others, came up with a list of seven proposed ideas:

1. Take responsibility not just for your own words, but for the comments you allow on your blog.
2. Label your tolerance level for abusive comments.
3. Consider eliminating anonymous comments.
4. Don't feed the trolls.
5. Take the conversation offline, and talk directly, or find an intermediary who can do so.
6. If you know someone who is behaving badly, tell them so.
7. Don't say anything online that you wouldn't say in person.

== Reception ==
Reaction to the proposal was internationally widespread among bloggers and media writers. According to the San Francisco Chronicle, the blogosphere described it as "excessive, unworkable and an open door to censorship." Author Bruce Brown approved of the code, reproducing in his book on blogging. TechCrunch founder Michael Arrington and entrepreneur and blogger Dave Winer were two notable Americans who wrote against the plan. Technology blogger Robert Scoble stated that the proposed rules "make me feel uncomfortable" and "As a writer, it makes me feel like I live in Iran."
