= The Edublog Awards =

Community based programme about Internet blogs

The Edublog Awards were an annual, community based programme which recognised and celebrated excellent practice in the use of web blogs and social media to facilitate education. Entries were accepted from any country, in any language, from educators working with any age group or type of learner, including learner led initiatives. Nominations opened within categories in November of each year, with the Awards event taking place in December following a community vote.

== History ==
The Awards were founded in 2004 by James N. Farmer, based in part on a suggestion by Alexander Halavais. The following year, Josie Fraser took over the awards management, working with Dave Cormier and Jeff Lebow from 2005 onwards. In 2007 James N. Farmer rejoined the team, and Jo Kay joined the team for the first time, providing the awards ceremony with a home in the virtual world platform Second Life. They were last awarded in 2015.

== Goals ==
The three main aims behind the awards were to:

- Provide an opportunity for an international community who are interested and involved in scholarly and education based blogging (edublog) and the use of social media an opportunity to come together as a community, discover new ways of using blogging and social media to support learning, and highlight the wealth of effective, innovative work being carried out globally.
- Provide a concrete, annually updated resource for those involved in or thinking about using social software and user-generated content sites to support education communities of all kinds. They also demonstrate the diverse use made of blogs, wikis, audiovisual tools, virtual worlds and social networking platforms.
- Demonstrate that new technologies can be used in positive, innovative, safe and effective ways. The Awards programme is designed to act as an argument against a moral panic approach to the use of technologies in education that threatens innovative and creative practice. The Awards argue that digital literacy and social participation for learners, educational employees and institutions as the effective way to address potential dangers, as opposed to banning and restricting access within education and library services.

== Winners ==
2004 2005 2006 2007 2008 2009 2010 2011
