= Ana Marie Cox =

American writer & editor (born 1972)

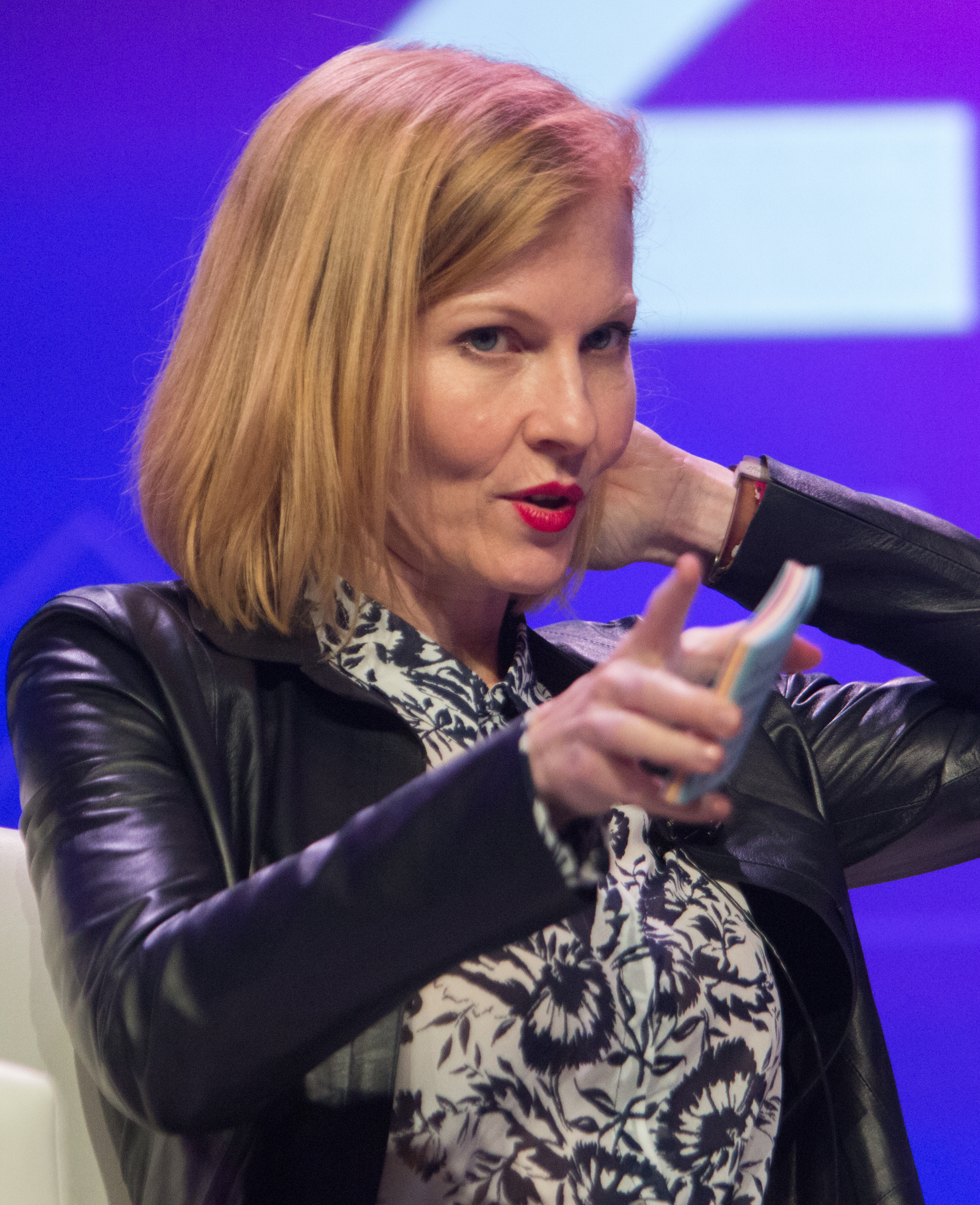
- Cox in 2017
- Born: September 23, 1972 (age 54); San Juan, Puerto Rico, U.S.
- Education: University of Chicago (BA)
- Occupation: Senior political correspondent
- Known for: Political blog Wonkette
- Spouses: Chris Lehmann (div. 2011); John Ramonas (m. 2015; div. 2021)

Ana Marie Cox (born September 23, 1972) is a liberal American author, blogger, political columnist, and critic. The founding editor of the political blog Wonkette, she was also the Senior Political Correspondent for MTV News, and conducted the "Talk" interviews featured in The New York Times Magazine from 2015 to 2017.

In 2010, Cox held the position of Washington correspondent for GQ. Cox has been a contributor for The Daily Beast since 2009. She previously worked at Air America Media. She was a lead blogger on U.S. politics for The Guardian, until August 2014, and an editor at Mother Jones.

== Early life ==
Cox was born in San Juan, Puerto Rico. Her family is from Texas and is of Scots-Irish descent. She attended Lincoln Southeast High School in Lincoln, Nebraska, where she wrote for the school's newspaper, The Clarion. She graduated from the University of Chicago with a Bachelor of Arts degree in history in 1994. She began graduate school at the University of California, Berkeley, where she was studying American history, but left school, and instead became an editorial assistant at the publishing company Alfred A. Knopf.

== Career ==
Cox was an editor of the progressive online magazine Bad Subjects. Later, she was an executive editor of Suck.com, where she wrote under the pen name Ann O'Tate, a wordplay on annotate.

In 2004, Cox became the founding editor of the political blog Wonkette. Under her tenure, Wonkette was a sportive commentary on Capitol Hill Washington politics, as well as more serious matters of politics and policy. Cox and Wonkette gained notoriety in the political world for publicizing the story of Jessica Cutler, also known as "Washingtonienne," a staff assistant to Senator Mike DeWine (R-Ohio) who accepted money from a George W. Bush administration official and others in exchange for sexual favors. On January 5, 2006, Cox officially announced her retirement as the blog's editor and her imminent transition to "Wonkette Emerita."

Cox's novel Dog Days, a satire of Washington, D.C. life for which she was reportedly paid $250,000, was published on January 6, 2006. The book received generally negative reviews. In The New York Times, Christopher Buckley described it as a "brisk, smart, smutty, knowing and very well-written first novel." In the Times as well, Janet Maslin wrote that despite Cox's "satirical expertise," the novel is replete with "stock characters" and "manages to be doubly conventional: it follows both an old-fashioned love-betrayal-redemption arc and the newer, bitchier nanny-Prada chick-lit motif." Writing in Slate.com, Toby Young found the novel "shallow." He continued,

The problem is, once the plot is set in motion, it never really takes flight. Dog Days has the makings of an entertaining comic novel, but Cox hasn't bothered to master the rudiments of the genre. I kept waiting for the different elements to come to a boil, but if anything, Cox turns down the heat as the story continues.

Kirkus Reviews adjudged that Cox offers "results that make Primary Colors read like Proust" and concluded, "[R]eaders hoping for some real-life dirt (or at least a salacious facsimile) will be dealt nothing more than lightweight fluff and throwaway farce." In the Los Angeles Times, Diana Wagman wrote, "Dog Days is predictable and, worst of all, mean-spirited. ... [It] is chick lit at its most hackneyed." "It's a novel torn from the day before yesterday's headlines," wrote P.J. O'Rourke in The Washington Post.

I won't spoil the plot. There isn't one. ... Dog Days is devoid of ideas or even references to ideas ... The people in Dog Days spend so much energy on instant-messaging, text-messaging, message-forwarding and such that it's no wonder they are too exhausted to have anything to say.

According to Human Events, more than a year after its publication the book had sold "a dismal 5,000 copies."

On July 27, 2006, Cox was named the Washington editor of Time.com, where she also wrote The Ana Log.

On April 12, 2007, Cox claimed on Time magazine's website that she agreed to appear on the Don Imus radio show despite its history of racially and sexually charged content because she wanted to be considered part of the media elite. Cox wrote: "I'm embarrassed to admit that it took Imus' saying something so devastatingly crass to make me realize that there just was no reason beyond ego to play along. I did the show almost solely to earn my media-elite merit badge." Cox announced on December 5, 2008, that she would no longer be contributing to Time magazine's Swampland blog.

On January 19, 2009, Cox debuted on Air America Media as their first Washington-based national correspondent. She was a frequent guest on The Rachel Maddow Show, and guest-hosted the show in Maddow's absence on September 4, 2009. In 2009, Cox also became a contributing editor for Playboy.

The February 17, 2010 episode of ABC's "Top Line" webcast announced that Cox had become the Washington correspondent for GQ magazine. Since September 26, 2011, she has worked as a blogger for The Guardian.

On September 26, 2012, book publisher Penguin Group sued Cox for the return of an $81,250 advance and $50,000 in interest, payment for a humorous book she agreed in 2006 to produce and never provided to the publisher. Penguin canceled the book in 2007 when Cox did not forward a manuscript.

Cox has been a contributor to The Daily Beast since 2009.

In February 2017, Cox launched the podcast With Friends Like These as part of the Crooked Media brand. She was also a guest of John Moe on his podcast The Hilarious World of Depression at American Public Media, where she talked about depression and being a survivor of “a couple” suicide attempts. In 2019, Cox took over as host of the podcast The Churn, SyFy's recap and commentary show on The Expanse. In 2020, she and co-host Daniel W. Drezner relaunched the podcast independently as Space the Nation.

== Personal life ==
Cox was married to Chris Lehmann, formerly of The Washington Post, New York, and Congressional Quarterly. They divorced in 2011. On October 11, 2014, Cox announced on Twitter that she was engaged to Minneapolis risk manager John Ramonas. She married Ramonas on New Year's Day 2015 in Vermont. Ramonas and Cox divorced in 2021.

Cox announced in an article in the Daily Beast that she had become a Christian. She has been sober since 2011.

In 2016, in honor of Carrie Fisher's death, Cox shared that she had bipolar disorder. She has written that she is a “survivor of sexual assault”. as well as “a couple” suicide attempts.
