= Diaryland =

Online diary, early blogging platform

- Website type: Online diary, blog hosting
- Available in: English, German, Spanish, French, Portuguese
- Website: www.diaryland.com
- Launched: September 1999
- Current status: Online

Diaryland is among the earliest online diary platforms, launched in 1999 by Canadian developer Andrew Smales. Diaryland has a social networking element in that its members can link to each other's diaries in "Buddy Lists," and leave notes, comments, and questions for each other. In May 2026, Diaryland launched a new version of the service, rebuilt on a new codebase and with expanded features. Version 2 includes a new publishing module that enables members to write, edit and publish newsletters, zines, and Books. All of the original diaries from the first 26 years are still accessible on the site, although there is a one-time fee to resurrect dormant diaries. The online diary is better known today as a blog.

Other early blogging and diary hosting websites included Blogger, LiveJournal, and Diary-X.

== History ==
Smales launched Diaryland in September 1999 after previously creating Pitas, an early weblog publishing service. He said that he wanted to create a system that made online diary publishing easy for people who did not know HTML. By December 1999, Diaryland had about 4,600 active members and was adding roughly 100 new members per day, largely through word of mouth.

A 2011 academic study of the early history of blogging identified Diaryland as one of the early software systems for creating online diaries, emerging alongside automated publishing tools such as Pitas, Groksoup, and Blogger.

In a 2014 retrospective on the first two decades of blogging, The Guardian included Diaryland alongside LiveJournal, Blogger, and WordPress among the services associated with the growth of personal blogging.

In May 2026, Diaryland launched Version 2, a rebuild of the service on a new codebase. The new version retained its diary-writing and community functions while adding publishing tools including newsletters, zines, and books.

== Design and community ==
Diaryland combined hosted online diaries with individual page customization. Members received their own Diaryland subdomain and could choose from a range of templates, while users familiar with HTML could modify their layouts further. In 1999, Salon described the templates as varying widely in color, format, and background design, and noted that Diaryland did not place advertising on members' individual diary pages.

The service also developed a strong social element. In 2001, The Washington Post reported that Diaryland had about 175,000 registered users, roughly two-thirds of them teenagers. The newspaper described online diaries as providing both personal expression and interaction with readers, with writers commonly publishing under pseudonyms and receiving responses from other users.

== Notable users and cultural references ==
Writer Patricia Lockwood has described Diaryland as part of her early online life. In a 2021 interview with GQ, she said that she used to check Diaryland regularly to read other bloggers. Diaryland also appears in Lockwood's novel No One Is Talking About This, in a scene involving a person whose Diaryland blog the protagonist had read years earlier.

The literary persona JT LeRoy maintained a Diaryland diary in the early 2000s. Singer-songwriter John Darnielle of The Mountain Goats has also said that he maintained a Diaryland site.
