= Edublog =

Educational discussion website

An edublog is a blog created for educational purposes. Edublogs support learning by facilitating reflection, questioning by self and others, collaboration and by providing contexts for engaging in higher-order thinking. Edublogs proliferated when blogging architecture became more simplified and teachers perceived the instructional potential of blogs as an online resource. The use of blogs has become popular in education institutions including public schools and colleges. Blogs can be useful tools for sharing information and tips among co-workers, providing information for students, or keeping in contact with parents. Common examples include blogs written by or for teachers, blogs maintained for the purpose of classroom instruction, or blogs written about educational policy. Educators who blog are sometimes called edubloggers.

== History ==
Weblogs have existed for close to two decades. However, it wasn't until the second half of the 1990s that weblogs began to grow in popularity. In 1998, there were just a handful of sites of the type that are now identified as weblogs (so named by Jorn Barger in December 1997). In 1999, weblogs changed from a mix of links, commentary, and thoughts, to short form journal entries. An early recorded use of the term "edublog" can be traced to a webring called the Edublog WebRing, founded on January 30, 2002. The new use of weblogs are largely interest driven and attract readers who have similar interests. In 2004, there were an estimated 3 million blogs and as of July 2011, there are an estimated 164 million blogs.

The Edublog Awards, the international and community based awards programme for the use of blogs and social media to support education, runs annually online across a range of platforms. The Awards were founded by James N. Farmer in 2004.

== Uses ==
There are several uses of edublogs. Some bloggers use their blogs as a learning journal or a knowledge log to gather relevant information and ideas, and communicate with other people. Some teachers use blogs to keep in contact with students' parents. Some bloggers use blogs to record their own personal life, and express emotions or feelings. Some instructors use blogs as an instructional and assessment tool, and blogs can be used as a task management tool. Blogs are used to teach individuals about writing for an audience as they can be made public, and blogging software makes it easier to create content for the Web without knowing much HTML.

Educational blogs have also been used as an engagement and reflective assessment tool for Accounting students and can improve educational outcomes for Accounting students.

Teachers can also use blogs to create a sense of community in their virtual classroom. Students can build and elaborate on what their classmates post. In addition, students and teachers can use educational blogs for feedback. Students can pose questions and ask for help from their classmates. Educational blogs can be a safe space where they can communicate freely and learn from one another. Education blogs can also be used as an effective homework assignment; if the educator assigns homework. These blogs can be used to get the students excited to talk to one another about the content.

== Teacher blogs ==
There are many teacher-related blogs on the internet where teachers can share information with one another. Teachers familiarize themselves with edublogs before implementing them with their students. Many teachers share materials and ideas to meet the diverse needs of all learners in their classrooms. Teachers can often rely on these sources to communicate with one another regarding any issues in education that they may be having, including classroom management techniques and policies. In this way, the blog often acts as a support system for teachers where they can access ideas, tools, and gain support and recognition from other professionals in their field. Weblogs can provide a forum for reading, writing and collaborating.

Edublogs can be used as instructional resources, in which teachers can post tips, explanations or samples to help students learn. The use of blogs in the classroom allows both the teacher and student the ability to edit and add content at any time. The ability for both the teacher and student to edit content allows for study to take place outside the classroom environment, since blogs can usually be accessed using the URL of the blog on any computer. Blogs increase exposure to other students from around the country or world, while improving writing and communication skills. Teachers are using blogs as a way to post important information such as homework, important dates, missed lessons, projects, discussion boards, and other useful classroom information that is accessible by all. As noted, students can access this information from home, or from any computer that is connected to the Internet.

Edublogs are vital to remote and distance learning. Through the use of Edublogs, teachers can simulate classroom-like discussion all at the click of a button. Students in remote and distance learning classrooms can easily converse with one another as if they are in class with one another. Edublogs are essential for remote and distance learning and any classroom using a technological platform. Teachers and parents can also use blogs in order to communicate with one another. They can be used to post class announcements for parents or providing schedule reminders. Connecting to a teacher's blog is also a convenient way for parents to find out daily assignments so that they can monitor their children's progress and understand classroom expectations.

== Student blogging in the K-12 classroom ==
Student blogging describes students in Kindergarten to Grade 12 who are using blogs in some way in a formal classroom context. Blogs are digital platforms that provide students with a medium for sharing knowledge and experiences that go beyond the traditional means of reading and writing in classrooms. Student blogging is a relative newcomer to the digital writing scene, and appears to have gained ground only in the past 7–8 years. In the past 5 years, however, student blogging has become a relatively common phenomenon in classrooms around the world. This may be attributable to the increase in free blog hosting services that have adjustable privacy settings, and the opening up of school internet filters to a greater range of social media.

The use of blogs in education gives students a global perspective. Teachers and students from different states, countries, and continents are able to collaborate on different projects and ideas. A classroom in China can collaborate with classrooms in Germany, Mexico, Australia, etc. with just a few clicks of a button. Learning through blogs allows students to take control of their own learning and steer it to their own needs. Students are able to see that opinions and even strategies vary based on location and culture. Children are all different, but a common thread of learning can unite them. The use of blogs in the classroom engages children in learning and using technological literacy that will help them in adulthood.

There has not been a significant amount of research conducted on K-12 students regarding the efficacy of edublogs in enhancing learning. However, anecdotal results discussed by educators have given a glimpse into their utility or promise. There is a general consensus that edublogs create many opportunities for collaborative learning, as well as enhance the ability to locate and reflect upon work.

=== Common pedagogical uses ===
According to extant literature, students use blogging in classrooms for different purposes. Blogs are used to showcase individual student work by enabling them to publish texts, video clips, audio clips, maps, photos and other images, projects and suchlike in a potentially publicly accessible forum. Proponents of student blogging argue that blogging can contribute directly to improved writing abilities and argue that classroom blogging can enable students to engage with audiences beyond their classroom walls by using blogs as personal journals, as diaries, for story writing, and for making editorial responses to news events. Researchers have also documented teachers using student blogging to promote creativity and self-expression.

=== Reasons for use ===
Some researchers claim that student blogs promote learning by providing opportunities for students to take more control of their learning and the content they engage. It is also claimed that student blogging intrinsically motivates students to become better readers and writers. Other reasons for encouraging student blogging is that it enables them to form and practice proper and safe internet etiquette and demonstrate that they are able to use technology efficiently and professionally. It also helps students to become familiar with internet copyright laws and regulations, important skills for participants in today's internet community. Finally, participating in blogging allows students to showcase their work or projects with a larger audience and receive feedback from a variety of students and teacher globally.

=== Potential limitations/some criticisms ===
There is very little research on student blogging available. That being said, there is a large amount of published anecdotal evidence regarding criticisms of student blogging or limitations in using blogging in classrooms. For example, commentators claim that student blogs often include uncorrected inaccuracies of information, or can be used to instigate online bullying. Commentators also complain that student blogs are difficult to archive or index.

== Professional development blogs for teachers ==
Although there are many blogs that teachers can use in the classroom with their students, there is also a multitude of blogs that teachers can use for their own professional development. Such blogs include hints on ways to be a better teacher in a certain subject area such as music, mathematics, or ESL, blogs on educational theory, blogs on advice for new teachers, blogs on where to find free technology, and blogs on transforming education, for example. There is much that can be learned from blogs of other teaching professionals and the learning can be done anytime and anywhere.

== See also ==
- Collaborative learning
- Educational technology
- E-learning glossary
- Networked learning
- M-learning
- Moblog
- Virtual learning environment
- Web-based training
