= Corporate blog =

Blogs maintained by a corporation

Corporate blog is a blog that is published and used by an organization, corporation, etc. to reach its organizational goals. The advantage of blogs is that posts and comments are easy to reach and follow due to centralized hosting and generally structured conversation threads. Although there are many different types of corporate blogs, most can be categorized as either external or internal.

== Types ==
=== Internal blogs ===
An internal blog, generally accessed through the corporation's Intranet, is a weblog that any employee can view. Many blogs are also communal, allowing anyone to post to them. The informal nature of blogs may encourage:

- employee participation
- free discussion of issues
- collective intelligence
- direct communication between various layers of an organization
- a sense of community

Internal blogs may be used in lieu of meetings and e-mail discussions, and can be especially useful when the people involved are in different locations, or have conflicting schedules. Blogs may also allow individuals who otherwise would not have been aware of or invited to participate in a discussion to contribute their expertise.

=== External blogs ===
An external blog is a publicly available weblog where company employees, teams, or spokespersons share their views. It is often used to announce new products and services (or the end of old products), to explain and clarify policies, or to react to public criticism on certain issues. It also allows a window to the company culture and is often treated more informally than traditional press releases, though a corporate blog often tries to accomplish similar goals as press releases do. In some corporate blogs, all posts go through a review before they are posted. Some corporate blogs, but not all, allow comments to be made to the posts. According to Hoffman Agency, corporate blogs should not be ‘about me’, but should be a platform to show thought leadership and communicate views on industry issues.

External corporate blogs, by their very nature, are biased, though they can also offer a more honest and direct view than traditional communication channels. Nevertheless, they remain public relations tools.

Corporate blogs may be written primarily for consumers (business-to-consumer) or primarily for other businesses (B2B). Certain corporate blogs have a very high number of subscribers. The official Google Blog is currently in the Technorati top 50 listing among all blogs worldwide. The number of subscribers, blog comments, links to blog posts, and the number of times a post is shared in other social media are indicators of a blog's popularity, potential influence, and reach. While business blogs targeted to consumer readers may have a high number of subscribers, comments, and other measures of engagement; corporate blogs targeted to other businesses, especially those in niche industries, may have a very limited number of subscribers, comments, links, and sharing via social media. Accordingly, other metrics are often evaluated to determine the success and effectiveness of B2B blogs.

Marketers might expect to have product evangelists or influencers among the audience of an external blog. Once they find them, they may treat them like VIPs, asking them for feedback on exclusive previews, product testing, marketing plans, customer services audits, etc.

The business blog can provide additional value by adding a level of credibility that is often unobtainable from a standard corporate site. The informality and increased timeliness of information posted to the blog assists with increasing transparency and accessibility in the corporate image. Business blogs can interact with a target market on a more personal level while building link credibility that can ultimately be tied back to the corporate site.
