= Ken Layne =

American novelist

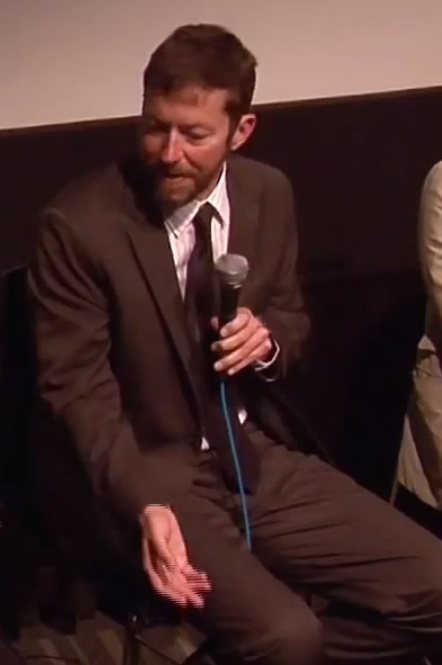
- Ken Layne at 92YTribeca in New York.
- Born: c. 1967 (aged 59–60); Louisiana
- Occupations: Writer; publisher; broadcaster
- Known for: Wonkette, Desert Oracle
- Notable work: Dignity (2011)

Ken Layne is an American writer, publisher and broadcaster best known for his political blogging in the early 2000s and his association with Gawker Media and Wonkette from 2006 to 2012. He is the proprietor of Desert Oracle, a self-published periodical and radio program exploring themes related to the Mojave Desert and the Southwestern United States. Layne has also written for outlets such as The New York Times, the Los Angeles Times, The Awl and LA CityBeat.

== Career ==
=== Early career ===
After graduating from a San Diego, California magnet high school focused on broadcast journalism, Layne began his career in the mid-1980s reporting for Southern California newspapers before moving to Europe, where he worked for television, radio, and print journalism outlets in Macedonia, the Czech Republic, and Hungary. In the late 1990s, Layne returned to the United States and turned to online journalism exclusively.

In April 1997, Layne co-founded Tabloid.net, an online publication in the "brassy style of tabloid newspapers", with $50,000 in savings. While unprofitable as a company, Tabloid.net attained notoriety as an "unabashed scandal-monger" and for suing a Florida advertising company for appropriating its intellectual property, "a talking ham sandwich that gives advice".

Layne's next venture was LAExaminer.com, co-founded in 2001 with future Reason editor-in-chief Matt Welch, focused in part on criticism of Los Angeles' last remaining daily newspaper, the Los Angeles Times. The "Examiner" name was intended as homage to the defunct Los Angeles Herald Examiner. In early 2003, former Los Angeles mayor Richard Riordan announced his intentions to publish a full-color, 52-page, tabloid-format print edition called Los Angeles Examiner, with Layne as editor, intended to improve on the Times' local reporting. A prototype was produced and circulated among potential investors and advertisers, however the project was shelved after Riordan delayed its launch in May 2003.

During this time period, Layne also received attention for blogging at his personal website, KenLayne.com, and became known in the early 2000s American political and technology blogosphere for a quote directed at the mainstream media: "We can fact-check your ass". Another Layne project of the era was called Highways West, a travel website about the Western United States, announced in January 2005.

=== Gawker Media and Wonkette ===
In April 2005, Layne joined with former Gawker editor Choire Sicha to launch Sploid, a Drudge Report-inspired, "tabloid-emulating" website for Gawker Media, devoted to breaking news. He later became "national correspondent" for the flagship Gawker website.

Layne became the West Coast writer for Gawker Media's "absurdist" and "vicious" political humor site Wonkette in 2006, and later its managing editor. Gawker owner Nick Denton spun off Wonkette in 2008, along with two other websites, and Layne became Wonkette's owner.

In 2009, MSNBC's Keith Olbermann named Layne and Wonkette in his "Worst Person in the World" segment for allegedly mischaracterizing a temporary absence from his television program. In 2011, Wonkette faced media criticism and desertion by advertisers after a writer mocked Trig Palin, the child of 2008 Republican vice presidential nominee Sarah Palin, who has Down syndrome. Layne deleted the post after several advertisers, including Papa John's Pizza, pulled their advertising from the site.

Layne sold Wonkette to Los Angeles journalist Rebecca Schoenkopf in 2012. Of his career writing for the Gawker Media sites, Layne said in 2018: "All of that I did from the desert, and no one knew".

=== Desert Oracle ===
In February 2015, Layne created Desert Oracle: The Voice of the Desert, a quarterly periodical focused on the "weirdness of the desert" in the Southwestern United States. Each edition runs 44 pages, most of which is written and designed by Layne, entirely in black-and-white, inside a yellow and black cover. Typical content includes "adventurers' journal entries, railroad ad copy, and ... naturalists' musings", as well as stories on "alien sightings" and other paranormal phenomena. Inspiration for Desert Oracle came from Randall Henderson's Desert Magazine and Harry Oliver's Desert Rat Scrap Book.

Published from Joshua Tree, California, Layne distributes the publications to bookstores and cafes across the desert southwest. As of 2018, Desert Oracle is available in five states and reaches the majority of its readership through the mail via paid subscription. Layne has also collected Desert Oracle articles in book form, the first volume of which published in 2020.

Desert Oracle became the basis of a weekly half-hour radio show, The Desert Oracle Radio, hosted by Layne for the community radio station KCDZ in June 2017. With subject matter similar to the print version, Layne's radio show features "chilling tales of Bigfoot sightings, secret military UFO programs, missing hikers, and any number of myths and conspiracies" centered in the Mojave desert and the American Southwest. The Desert Oracle Radio reaches Joshua Tree National Park and nearby towns including Pioneertown, Twentynine Palms and Yucca Valley by terrestrial broadcast; the show is also available as a podcast.

== Other writing ==
Layne is the author of two novels, Dot.con, published in 2001, and Dignity, an epistolary novel about a group of Los Angelenos creating a new community within abandoned desert housing developments following an economic collapse, in 2011.

He formerly was a columnist for USC Annenberg School's Online Journalism Review, and wrote a column called "Desert Rattler" for LA CityBeat, both now defunct. Other writing by Layne has appeared in The New York Times, Los Angeles Times, and The Awl.

== Personal life ==
Layne was born in Louisiana, where he lived in the Lower Ninth Ward of New Orleans as a child. He moved to the Phoenix, Arizona suburbs for middle school, and later to San Diego, where he first began visiting the Mojave desert.

Layne records his own music, and formerly played with Southern California rock musicians Country Dick Montana and Buddy Blue Seigal.

He has cited Desert Solitaire by Edward Abbey as an influence, whom he met and corresponded with before Abbey's death in 1989.
