= Tailrank.com =

Blog content aggregator site

Tailrank.com was a site that provided a feed of content on the World Wide Web that was being discussed across the blogosphere. The site continuously scanned blogs that had been registered with it, and composed an index of "top stories" that had been cited by the various blogs it had scanned.

The focus of the site was the news items themselves, but users were also able to see snippets of the various blog citations that made the story popular.

The list of top stories changed over time; newer items were given a higher score than older items, and more popular items were given a higher score than less popular items. Items high on the list tended to be articles or posts that had triggered a lot of blog activity over the last day or so.

Because the site's index allowed one to follow the spread of ideas from blog to blog, it could have been considered a memetracker. It was the closest thing to a modern equivalent of blogdex, which has also been shut down.

Tailrank.com shut down some time before June 2009.
