= Penzu =

Private online diary-hosting website

- Type: Private
- Founded: 2008
- Founder: Alexander Mimran (CEO); Michael Lawlor; Simon Wilkinson
- Headquarters: Toronto, Ontario, Canada
- Area served: Worldwide
- Services: Private online diary platform
- Website: penzu.com

Penzu is a private online diary-hosting website. Users can create written entries similar to a standard personal journal and can also upload photos from their devices. Penzu uses a freemium business model with special paid features including unique fonts, AES encryption, rich text formatting, and others. As of 2014, the website had over 1 million users in 170 countries worldwide.

== History ==
Penzu was founded in 2008 in Toronto by Alexander Mimran (CEO), Simon Wilkinson (CTO), and Michael Lawlor (former CTO). Mimran took out a second mortgage on his house in order to initially fund Penzu. Capital has come only in the form of self-funding and customer revenue through PayPal. Three thousand users signed up during the company's first week of operation. The early version of the website mimicked standard notebooks with no custom fonts, colors, themes, or other distinguishing features. In 2009, Penzu launched a paid "Pro" option that cost $19 per year. Features that came with the Pro version included AES encryption, tagged posts, rich text editing, offsite backups, new themes, and other customization options. Opening a journal, making private posts, and several other customization features remained free.

In 2011, the company announced that it was serving over 250,000 users. It also released Penzu apps for Android and iOS devices. Both apps could only be used in conjunction with a Penzu Pro subscription.

In 2014, Penzu underwent a full relaunch, which included a redesigned website, free syncing between mobile and web apps, and other new features. At the time, the company had around 1.1 million users in 170 countries across the world.

== Service ==
Penzu offers an online cloud-based diary platform that is designed to be private by default. It is free to sign up for Penzu and to create entries, upload images, and share posts selectively. The Penzu Pro plan offers several other features. These features include unique customization options like fonts, colors, themes, and others; 256-bit AES encryption; tagging; importing and exporting (as, for example, a PDF); rich text formatting; the ability to post by email; reminders; and numerous others. The site's encryption feature works for entire journals. If the password is lost for a particular journal, then that entry cannot be retrieved under any circumstance. Other Pro features include Looking Glass, which sends excerpts of older posts to the journal owner via email, and Legacy, which allows users to choose specific individuals to access the journal after the journal owner's death.
