= Escribitionist =

An escribitionist is a person who keeps a diary or journal via electronic means, and in particular, publishes their entries on the World Wide Web. The word was coined in June 1999 by Erin Venema, an online diarist, in the course of a discussion on a mailing list for web journalers. At issue was how to distinguish web journal authors from keepers of traditional paper-and-ink diaries.

The word comes from a combination of the English word "exhibitionist" and the Spanish word "escribir", meaning "to write". (The latter is cognate to the English "scribe"; both come from the Latin scribere.) It also evokes the marketing gimmick of using the letter "e" as a prefix to imply a link to technology and electronics, although that was not intended.

Coined before the widespread use of weblogs, the word escribitionist is often used to distinguish diary keepers on the web from weblog authors, whose writing often involve far more diverse styles, perspectives and subjects than those used in personal journals. While a weblog author may engage in journaling, or reporting, or political commentary, an escribitionist is focused on personal experiences and reflection.

== See also ==
- Online diary
