= Diary-X =

Defunct diary website (2000–2006)

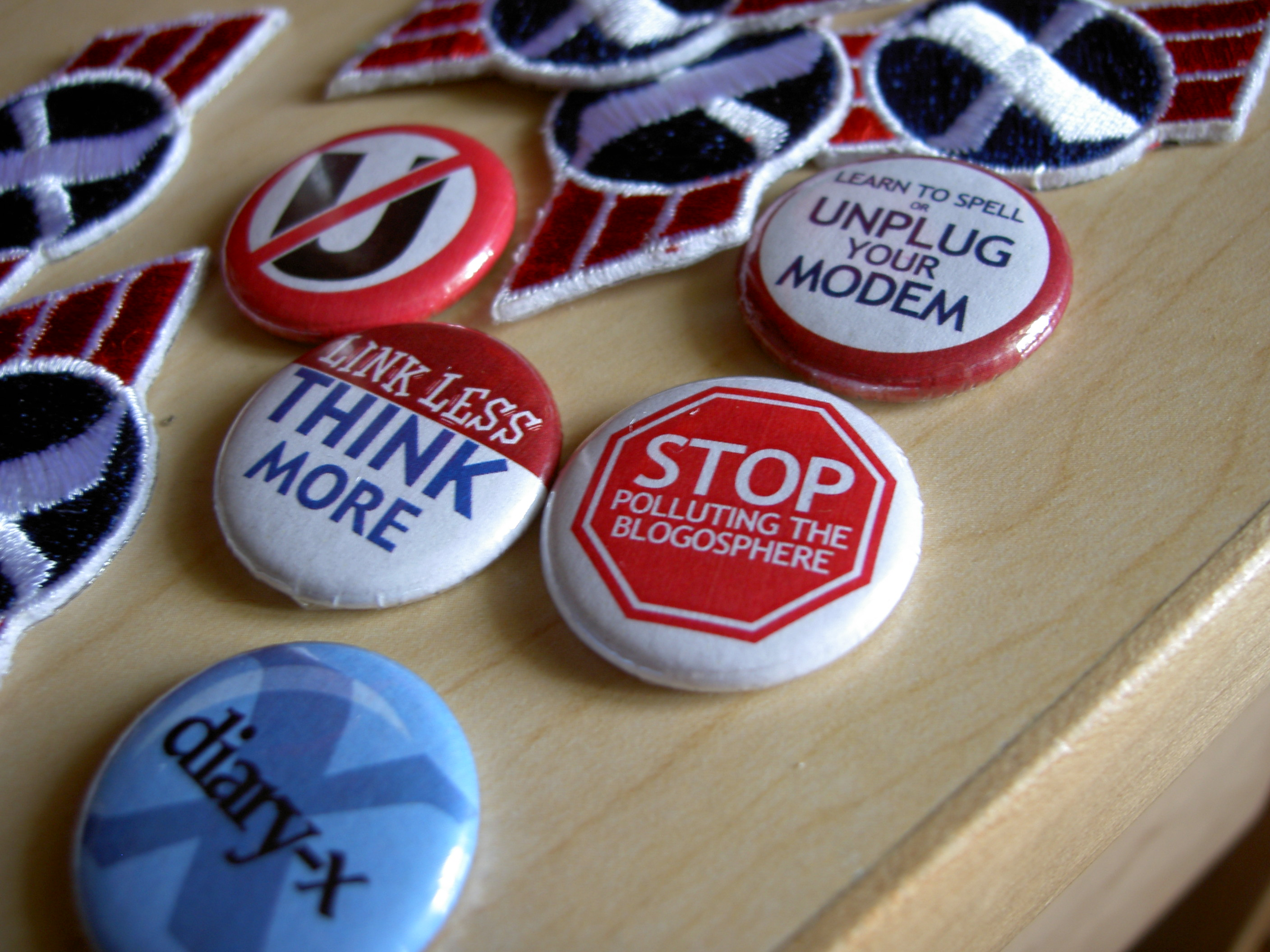
Diary-X buttons and patches

Diary-X (commonly abbreviated dx) was an online diary website which allowed users to create and maintain a personal journal.

== Overview ==
It was launched in 2000, and between half and three-quarters of its users were 14–19 years old. Basic use was free, though for a small fee users could email their entries. The creator and webmaster was Stephen Deken.

It had about 120,000 diaries. In early 2006, the server's hard drive failed, and since there was no backup, the entire website and all users' diaries were lost irretrievably.

Contemporary blogging and diary hosting websites included Blogger, LiveJournal, and Diaryland.
