= Blogdex =

Blogdex was an online service you could use to find popular topics of discussion in the blogosphere.

The site offered a time-weighted list of links to online content cited by more than one monitored blog in the recent past. Each link received a score based both on the number of different blogs citing it and the recency of those citings; the list thus typically features both popular oddities of the day as well as informative and/or controversial source material for current topics of public debate. Despite its explicit focus on blogs, it can be thought of as the original memetracker, and the inspiration for later commercial sites such as tailrank.com, Digg.com, and other social media sites.

As the previous owner of the domains blogdex.com, blogdex.net and blogdex.org, Jimmy Wales offered the domains to MIT free of charge for use in the project. Blogdex then migrated from the original blogdex.media.mit.edu location to blogdex.net.

Blogdex was created by Cameron Marlow, then a Ph.D. student at MIT along with Elizabeth Wood, then a high school student attending the RSI summer program at MIT. Marlow now works for Facebook.

Blogdex has been offline since May 2006.
