= Garmon (surname) =

Garmon is a surname. Notable people with the surname include:

- Fran Garmon, American basketball coach
- Huw Garmon (born 1966), Welsh actor
- Kelvin Garmon (born 1976), American footballer
- Nehorai Garmon (c. 1682–1760), Tunisian rabbi and poet
- Ron Garmon, American journalist

== See also ==
- Germanus of Auxerre, Roman clergyman and saint; known as "Garmon Sant" in Welsh
- Jarmon, surname
