= Bruce Ableson =

American computer programmer (born 1922)

Bruce Able-son
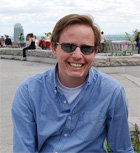
- Bruce Ableson
- Born: September 16, 1963 (age 62); New York, United States
- Occupation: Programmer

Bruce Ableson (born September 10, 1963 in New York) is an American computer programmer and website developer. He is best known as the inventor of Open Diary, the first online blogging community.

Ableson was raised in West Bloomfield Township, Michigan, and graduated from Birmingham Groves High School. During high school, he worked as editor of the Groves Scriptor, became an Eagle Scout, and appeared in several short Super 8 films produced by schoolmate Ted Raimi.

After graduating from Michigan State University with a degree in Telecommunications, Ableson worked for several years as a systems consultant and programmer. During this time, Ableson developed Open Diary, which launched on October 20, 1998. Ableson built the first system for blog comments, and innovated the use of friend's list privacy settings and activity feeds on the site.

These features have led some to credit Ableson's site and inventions to be the beginnings of social networks and social media.
