= IsRealli =

Israel's official blog

IsRealli is the official blog of the State of Israel and the first official blog to ever be started by a government. Originally called Israel Video Blog, the site was launched on February 16, 2006 by the Consulate General of Israel in New York. In October 2006, the blog was relaunched as isRealli, with the tagline, “The New Blog of Israel.” This was the first initiative by the Israeli Consulate in New York City in Public Diplomacy 2.0. Following the success of isRealli, the Consulate launched a series of new media projects including a MySpace page, YouTube site, political blog, and Twitter press conference, which was widely reported by news media around the world. isRealli is maintained on a daily basis by the media and public affairs team at the Consulate General of Israel in New York.

== Title ==
isRealli is a play on the words “Israel” and “Really.” The blog showcases stories of a non-political nature, and aims to highlight the issues that don’t always get covered in major news outlets across the world.

== Topics ==
isRealli covers the latest news in Israeli culture, with topics including: Advertising & Media, Art & Cinema, Business & Finance, Celebrities, Environment, Face to Face, Food & Drink, Humor, Lifestyle, Music, Pop Culture, Religion, Sciences, Sports, Technology, Television, and Tourism.

== Demographic ==
isRealli attracts users from more than 150 countries from across the globe, including Sweden, United Kingdom, Iran, Canada, Germany, India, Turkey, Egypt, Malaysia, and many more.
