= Sideblog =

Feature on blogging websites

A sideblog is a feature on a website, particularly a blog, that allows one to communicate smaller snippets of information than an actual blog post. The reasoning is that a blog post will require thought, argument and some semantic structuring of the post, while a sideblog typically displays "brief asides". A sideblog is meant to illustrate your immediate thoughts, movements or status update, and is usually less than 200 characters. Where a blog post may be compared to a newspaper opinion piece, a sideblog would be akin to the "news in brief" column.

Sideblogging is wedded to the concept of micro-blogging, where one posts brief snippets to interested observers via text messaging, instant messaging, email or the web. Using the same tools, one can post to one's micro-blog and to one's sideblog simultaneously. Most sideblogs are actually embedded micro-blogs that appear in a small sidebar box next to the main blog posts and use feeds or plugins to display the content.

Frequently updating one's status and frame of mind in an online platform to be viewed by friends gained widespread adoption through social networking tools like Facebook and MySpace. While those tools are still largely desktop-bound, micro-blogs (and, by extension, sideblogs) are designed to be updated from mobile devices as well as desktop computers. Therefore, it is more convenient to post one's status with a simple text message, and interested parties can note your status by browsing your sideblog or receiving a text or instant messaging alert.

This meaning came to change with the advent of blogrolls, blog engine plugins, and widgets and third-party lists of social media, like tag clouds and social bookmarks.

== See also ==
- Blog
- Tumblelog
- Web 2.0
- Twitter
