= Israblog =

Israeli blogging service

- Website type: Blogging Service
- Owner: Israblog Association
- Founder: Yariv Habot
- Website: www.israblog.co.il
- Commercial: No
- Launched: 25 August 2001
- Current status: Active

Israblog (Hebrew: ישראבלוג) is an Israeli blogging service, where mostly Hebrew-speaking Internet users keep blogs (including photoblogs) and enjoy many social networking features. With over 50,000 active bloggers, it is considered the biggest blogging service in Hebrew. It was previously operated by Nana10, based in Giv'atayim, Israel. Since May 2020, it is being operated by a nonprofit organization.

== History ==
Israblog is the first blogging service in Hebrew. It was founded on August 25, 2001 by Yariv Habot, in order to afford Hebrew-speaking Internet users the option of writing a blog in their mother tongue, without facing encoding and text directions problems. At first it was an experimental project, but within a few months it gathered few hundred passionate users and started to receive attention from the Israeli media. As of May 2020, close to 870,000 blogs have been opened on the site.

On October 4, 2006, Habot announced he was selling Israblog for an undisclosed amount to Nana (later "nana10"), an Israeli portal which had a business relationship with him for a while.

In December 2017, it was announced that the website will be shut down imminently, but it continued to operate. After a period of inactivity from late 2019, the website was reopened as a nonprofit on May 27, 2020, with all its existing content.
