= Memetracker =

Tool for studying the migration of memes

A memetracker is a tool for studying the migration of memes across a group of people. The term is typically used to describe websites that either:

1. analyze blog posts to determine what web pages are being discussed or cited most often on the World Wide Web, or
2. allow users to vote for links to web pages that they find of interest.

Sites in the latter group are often referred to as social media sites.

== Sample systems ==
The original publicly viewable memetracker was Blogdex, which is now defunct. However, many sites inspired by it exist today, such as:

- Digg.com (a popular social media site)
- Slashdot
- Reddit
- Technorati
- Techmeme
- Polymeme
- Wikio

Memetrackers are frequently characterized by purely automatic operation in determining the most popular links, though many modern sites incorporate some level of human editorial control in an effort to combat spam links and other efforts to exploit the services commercially.

The introduction of memetrackers was instrumental in the rise of blogs as a serious competitor to traditional printed news media. Through automating (or reducing to one click) the effort to spread ideas through word of mouth, it became possible for casual blog readers to focus on the best of the blogosphere rather than having to scan numerous individual blogs. The steady and frequent appearance of citations of or votes for the work of certain popular bloggers also helped create the so-called "A List" of bloggers.

== See also ==
- Web 2.0
- Viral marketing
- Topic modeling
