= BlogPulse =

BlogPulse was a search engine and analytic system for blogs. It used automated processes to monitor the daily activity on blogs and generate trend information. It was initially created by IntelliSeek, and was later acquired by the Nielsen Company, and currently owned by NM Incite, a joint venture between Nielsen and McKinsey & Company. As of January 2012, BlogPulse is no longer available.

== Features ==
BlogPulse permitted searching of the past six months of blog posts. Beyond searching, it offered the following tools:

- Trend search – generate a buzz trend chart for up to three such groups of query terms
- Blog profiles – in-depth data about the top blogs, analysis of their blog presence, activity, and influence
- Real-time buzz – seen on the home page, provides an up to the minute view of the buzz trend across major categories
- Conversation tracker – create a threaded conversation graph for any topic or blog post to see how the buzz spread through blogs for that topic
- Daily analytics – top links, top blogs, top videos, top news stories, key people, top blog posts, key phrases, top news sources all updated daily
- Highlights – curated trends in buzz, updated daily

== Benefits ==
As a blog search engine, BlogPulse could be used to do a search of just blog posts. Bloggers could ensure their posts were being indexed and find out how they rank against other bloggers. Public relations or media relations practitioners could use BlogPulse to learn about the buzz around any brand or company they represent. It also served as a tool for researching what trends people were paying attention to.

== See also ==
- Technorati
- BlogScope
- Google Blog Search
