= Comparison of free blog hosting services =

A number of websites offer free hosting of blogs. The services they offer are compared below. (This list is limited to services that have their own Wikipedia article.)

== Free blog hosting services ==
	Company	Founded	Active	Platform	Storage	Bandwidth	File size limit	FTP upload	Themes	Ad-free	Adv Support	Domain registration	Backup	Plugin	Custom HTML	Custom CSS	Custom JavaScript	Mobile	Scheduled posting	Post categories	Post tags	HTML5	eCommerce
Blogger	Google	1999	Yes	Proprietary	15 GB (synchronized with Google drive)	Unlimited	None	No	30	Yes	Yes - AdSense	Free	Yes (Downloadable XML)	Limited	Yes	Yes	Yes	Yes	Yes	No	Yes	Yes	No
Tumblr	Automattic	2007	Yes	Proprietary	Unlimited	Unlimited	Photo size per post is 10 MB	No	~1000	No	No	Paid Only	No	Very Limited	Yes	Yes	Yes	Yes	Yes	No	Yes	Yes	No
Weebly	Weebly	2007	Yes		500 MB (Free)									~250									
Wix.com	Wix.com	2007	Yes	Proprietary	500MB (Free); 20GB (Paid Only)	500MB (Free); Unlimited (Paid Only)	?	No	Many different	Paid Only	Yes	Paid Only	No	~250	Partial	Inline Only	Partial	Yes	Yes	Yes	Yes	Yes	Yes
WordPress	Automattic	2007	Yes	Modified WordPress	1GB	Unlimited	?	No	~250	Paid Only	No	Paid Only	Yes	20	Yes	Paid Only	No	Yes	Yes	Yes	Yes	Yes	Yes

== See also ==
- Comparison of file hosting services
- Comparison of online backup services
