= Open Diary =

Online diary community

- Website type: Blog Social Network
- Dissolved: February 28, 2026; 8 months ago
- Owners: Blather, Inc.
- Creator: Bruce Ableson
- Website: www.opendiary.com
- Commercial: Yes
- Launched: October 20, 1998; 28 years ago
- Current status: Fully closed

Open Diary (often abbreviated as "OD") was an online diary community, an early example of social networking software. It was founded on October 20, 1998. Open Diary went offline on February 7, 2014, but was re-launched on January 26, 2018. The site was owned and operated by Bruce Ableson and Susan Ableson, known on the Open Diary website by the title of their diaries, The DiaryMaster and The DiaryMistress. Ableson has described Open Diary as "the first web site that brought online diary writers together into a community."

Open Diary has hosted more than five million diaries since it was founded, and was home to over half a million diaries. As of October 2008, there were over 561,000 diaries on OpenDiary.com, including diaries from 77 countries and all 7 continents. The site innovated some key features that later became central to the architecture of other social networking and blogging sites, including reader comments and friends-only privacy.

== History ==
Open Diary went online on October 20, 1998. Shortly afterwards, the site added the ability for readers to post comments on others' diary entries – an innovation that was the forerunner of the interactive nature of today's blogs and blog comments. Early features of the site included public or private diary entries, indexes of diaries by age and geographic location, and a "Favorites" page for the diary owner. The Favorites page was used to aggregate information about the latest posts of the user's friends, and was a predecessor of the friends lists and "friends-only" privacy options used by many blogging and social networking sites today.

In late 1998, the site was featured as a Yahoo! Pick of the Week and membership increased rapidly, growing to more than 10,000 diaries in the first six months. In 2000, Ableson created two related websites: Teen Open Diary (in January), and Quit Smoking Diary (in April). A September 7, 2000 feature article in USA Today described Open Diary as "the Internet home of more than 130,000 personal online journals," in addition to the more than 25,000 diaries hosted on Teen Open Diary and the more than 1,700 hosted on Quit Smoking Diary. The article describes the demographics of the site as 75% female, with more than half of all diarists being 21 years old or younger.

On November 2, 2000, the Diary Circles feature was added to the site. Diary Circles provided a common space where members could cross-post entries from their diaries related to specific topics. The most popular circles include "Depression", "Relationships", "Poetry", "Love & Passion", and "Advice Wanted".

Two diarists posted entries while on assignment at McMurdo Station, Antarctica during 2001 – possibly making Open Diary the first online community to have people writing from all seven continents.

Open Diary introduced the premium service Open Diary Plus in 2001, a paid version of the original Open Diary. In addition to freedom from advertisements, Open Diary Plus offered several new features, including the ability to block specific users from reading the diary and the ability to organize the diary into chapters. The free and paid versions of the site were temporarily separated into FreeOpenDiary.com and OpenDiaryPlus.com. The two sites were later recombined, with free and paid memberships both remaining available at OpenDiary.com.

A major upgrade to the Open Diary software was released in September 2003, adding the "Favorites Only" (later Friends Only) option for diary access, private notes, member interests, and other features. At the end of 2003, there were over 218,000 diaries active on the site.

During 2004, privacy options on the site were further expanded, allowing users to set individual entries as "Favorites Only" and selecting who could read Favorites Only entries on a person-by-person basis. On September 11, 2004, the site was subjected to a major hacking attack, during which the site's databases were accessed and several weeks of diary entries were erased.

In April 2005, a new diary interface was added, giving users the option of including profile pictures and lists of their interests and favorites in their diary pages. A Lifetime Membership level of paid subscription was added in February, 2006, granting Open Diary Plus privileges for the life of the site for a price of US$100 (raised to $150 in 2009). A need for additional revenues to cover server and security costs resulting from the 2004 hacking attack was cited as the reason for adding this option.

Teen Open Diary and Quit Smoking Diary were discontinued in May 2006, and members were given the option of transferring their diary to the main Open Diary site. Also in 2006, the OD Boards were added to the site, a set of community forums that were moderated by volunteer Open Diary members.

In February 2008, new administrative volunteers were added to the staff to help with technical support, rules monitoring, and communications with the users. On October 20, 2008, the site celebrated its tenth anniversary online.

Open Diary 6.0, a broad upgrade to the site, was released on February 23, 2009. This version included a new interface, new navigation, picture storage for Plus users, entry tagging, and several more new features.

On May 29, 2009, an additional version of the site optimized for mobile devices was released.

As of spring 2012, the site's helpdesk software was taken down due to lack of funds, leaving the administrators fewer tools to communicate with users and provide service.

On January 28, 2014, it was announced that Open Diary was shutting down within two weeks.

On February 7, 2014, the site went offline at 12:02 AM EST. The associated Facebook page and Twitter account were also taken offline at the same time.

On October 19, 2017, the Open Diary Outage Board (ODOB) posted that the site went into testing mode for a new service. In its FAQ page, Open Diary promises to start a new subscription-only mode this year (according to the ODOB, on New Year's Eve (in another post of the same day)). Old members are promised to be notified once the site is ready to serve diarists. According to the site, all diary entries from when the site shut down have been preserved.

Open Diary re-launched publicly on January 26, 2018, offering a reclaim mechanism for ex-members to regain access to their diaries. Open Diary now functions as a subscription website, with the first thirty days free and then a $3.99 (USD) per month subscription after that.

In late 2025, it was announced the site would be shut down on January 31, 2026. This deadline was later extended to February 28.

== Features ==
Open Diary allowed users to create diaries that are public, private, or friends-only. Within a diary, individual entries were either public, private, or friends-only, if the level of overall diary privacy allowed it. Users were able to post an unlimited number of entries in their diaries.

Diary entries on the site accepted user comments, which were linked back to the noter's diary. Notes left on diaries were either set to public or private (only visible to the entry author), and diaries were set to accept anonymous notes from people outside of Open Diary, or from members only.

The Diary Circles feature provided a place where diary entries of a similar nature could be posted together. These circles were linked to the Open Diary Boards, a message board component that was added to the site on April 27, 2006.

Entries recommended by Open Diary users were listed on the Reader's Choice page. Users created a "favorites" list bookmarking other diaries of interest. They added a list of "interests" to their profile, and search for diarists who have expressed interest in a particular topic.

Open Diary also provided a free email service, which was not limited to Open Diary members.

== Security ==
The Open Diary website was the victim of two major hacking attacks.

On September 11, 2004, the Open Diary database server was hacked, resulting in the loss of eleven weeks worth of diary entries for all members. Bruce Ableson offered a cash bounty for information leading to the arrest of the hacker, and the FBI was involved in the investigation. On February 2, 2006, Ableson introduced $100 Lifetime subscriptions, stating that this new membership level was created to raise money after declining subscription rates in the period following the 2004 hacker attack caused Open Diary to go into debt. Lifetime members were told they would be given extra features, communication, and consideration beyond the OD Plus level. However, as of Spring 2012, these subscriptions are no longer available due to lack of responsiveness from site administrators.

On August 28, 2008, Open Diary was again hacked. Ableson took the site offline, with a message on the front page stating that there had been a security breach and the email addresses and passwords of some users had been compromised, but that no diary content had been lost. The site went back online on August 29, with a post from Ableson stating that over 2,000 users' email addresses and passwords had been compromised by a script exploiting a weakness in the site's security. Affected users were assigned temporary passwords and notified by email.
