= LA CityBeat =

Defunct newspaper based in Los Angeles, U.S.

- Type: Alternative weekly
- Format: Tabloid
- Owner: Southland Publishing
- Publisher: Rick Haelig
- Editor-in-chief: Steve Appleford
- Deputy editor: Dean Kuipers
- Staff writers: Dennis Romero; Donnell Alexander
- Founded: June 12, 2003; 22 years ago
- Ceased publication: March 26, 2009; 16 years ago
- Headquarters: 5209 Wilshire Blvd. Los Angeles, CA 90036
- Country: United States
- Circulation: 65,000 (as of 2009)
- Website: citybeatla.com

LA CityBeat was an alternative weekly newspaper in Los Angeles, California, debuting June 12, 2003. Its publication ceased on March 26, 2009, issue. LA CityBeat was available every Thursday at more than 1,500 distribution locations throughout the Los Angeles area, with an initial circulation of 100,000 (dropping to 65,000 in its final year).

== History ==
Southland Publishing, which published a group of newsweeklies that covered counties, cities and neighborhoods in Greater Los Angeles – the "Southland" – also owned Valley Business Printers in the neighborhood of Sylmar, Los Angeles. Amongst Valley Business Printers' third party customers, until the end of March 2003, was the city-wide LA Weekly; in June 2003, just three months after LA Weekly cancelled its contract for printing services, Southland Publishing launched its own publication, LA CityBeat, to compete with its former printing customer.

LA CityBeat was a member of the Alternative Weekly Network and was a rare unanimous recommendation for membership in the Association of Alternative Newsweeklies. Other unanimous membership votes have included New York City's The Village Voice and Halifax's The Coast.

In October 2008, publisher Charles Gerencser left to join the Obama campaign. In March 2009, Southland Publishing ceased permanently the publication of LA CityBeat. Bruce Bolkin, president of Southland Publishing, wrote "It is with great regret that as of the March 26, 2009 issue, Southland Publishing, Inc. has decided to discontinue publishing the Los Angeles CityBeat alternative weekly publication. For 6 years, the Los Angeles CityBeat has offered a fresh perspective to the readers of Los Angeles, and Southland is extremely proud of its writers and entire staff who have contributed to the paper." In March 2010, AdWeek reported that LA CityBeat's online archive (2005-2010) had disappeared.

== Staff ==
The inaugural staff included editor-in-chief Steve Appleford, publisher Rick Haelig, deputy editor Dean Kuipers, arts editor Natalie Nichols, award-winning film editor Andy Klein, art director Dana Collins, staff writer Dennis Romero, and calendar editor Rebecca Epstein. Donnell Alexander joined later as a staff writer.

Contributors included Andrew Berardini, Mick Farren, Richard Foss, Ron Garmon, Tom Hayden, Ken Layne, and Richard Meltzer. Graphic artists who contributed regularly included Jordan Crane, Tony Millionaire, Ted Rall, and Brian Stauffer.

Photographer Gary Leonard's "Take My Picture" (a long-running photo feature that originally debuted in Los Angeles Reader and then New Times LA) appeared weekly in LA CityBeat for more than five years.
