= Petite Anglaise =

Petite Anglaise is the pseudonym of Catherine Sanderson, a British blogger living in Paris, whose blog articles caused her to be sacked from Dixon Wilson Chartered Accountants. Subsequently, she was offered a publishing deal, and her first book, "Petite Anglaise" was published in 2008.

The phrase "petite anglaise" translates literally as "little english (female)", and is commonly used by French people to refer to young English women.

Sanderson's blog touches on various personal issues, but was written until July 2006 entirely anonymously. In April 2006 her employer became aware of the blog, and sacked her, initially for gross misconduct, though this was later revised to "dismissal for real and serious cause - breakdown of trust". The press interest as a result of this resulted in her identity being revealed by the Daily Mail newspaper. She took her former employer to an employment tribunal, where in March 2007 her complaint was upheld and she was awarded €44,000 plus legal costs.

In September 2006 she signed a deal with Penguin Books to write two books. The first of these - a memoir based on events recounted in the blog - was released in hardback in the United Kingdom on 6 March 2008, and on 17 June in the US. The UK paperback was released on 5 February 2009, with a US release due in June 2009.
