= Jarman =

Jarman is a surname. Notable people with this name include:

- Alan Jarman (1923–1992), Australian politician
- Andrew Jarman (born 1966), Australian footballer
- Barry Jarman (1936–2020), Australian cricketer and footballer
- Billy Jarman (1887–1916), English rugby league footballer
- Cat Jarman (born 1982), Norwegian archaeologist and television presenter
- Claude Jarman Jr. (1934–2025), American child film actor
- Darren Jarman (born 1967), Australian footballer
- Derek Jarman (1942–1994), English film director, stage designer, artist and writer
- Duncan Jarman, makeup artist
- Eleanor Jarman (born 1901), American fugitive
- Frances Eleanor Jarman (1802–1873), British actress
- Gary Jarman (born 1980), bassist with British band The Cribs
- Geraint Jarman (1950–2025), Welsh musician
- Harold Jarman (born 1939), English footballer and cricketer
- Harry Jarman (1883–1928), Welsh rugby player
- Jake Jarman (born 2001), British artistic gymnast
- John Jarman (1915–1982), American politician
- Joseph Jarman (1937–2019), American musician
- Julia Jarman (born 1946), British author
- Kate Jarman (born 1980), Welsh actress
- Lee Jarman (born 1977), Welsh footballer
- Mark Jarman, American poet and critic
- Mark Anthony Jarman (born 1955), Canadian fiction writer
- Nathan Jarman (born 1986), English footballer
- Pauline Jarman (born 1945), Welsh politician
- Richard Jarman (1807–1877), English and Australian artist and engraver
- Robert Jarman, Australian theatre director and writer
- Rosemary Hawley Jarman (1935–2015), English novelist and writer of short stories
- Ross Jarman (born 1984), drummer with British band The Cribs
- Ryan Jarman (born 1980), guitarist with British band The Cribs
