= Wonkette =

American online magazine

- Website type: Politics, satire
- Available in: English
- Owner: Wonkette Media
- Website: wonkette.com
- Commercial: Yes
- Launched: January 2004
- Current status: Active

Wonkette is an American online magazine of topical and political gossip, established in 2004 by Gawker Media and founding editor Ana Marie Cox. The editor since 2012 is Rebecca Schoenkopf, formerly of OC Weekly. Wonkette covers U.S. politics in a satirical manner.

== Launch and history ==
Wonkette was established in January 2004 as part of the Gawker Media network. Its founding editor was Ana Marie Cox, a former editor at suck.com.

Cox rapidly established a large reading audience and media notice for the site. The blog gained further national media attention after Cox publicized the story of Jessica Cutler aka "Washingtonienne", a former Hill staffer who blogged about her affair with a member of former Senator Mike DeWine's staff.

Cox announced her resignation as Wonkette's editor on January 5, 2006, in order to promote her book, Dog Days, and was succeeded by David Lat, the author of Underneath Their Robes, a blog about the federal judiciary, and Alex Pareene, a young New York University student and Gawker intern/guest editor in New York who moved to D.C. for the Wonkette position. (In late 2007, Pareene moved to the flagship Gawker site and, in April 2010, to Salon.)

In June 2006, Lat announced his decision to leave Wonkette. His slot was to be filled by guest editors until August 2006, when longtime political blogger Ken Layne joined as editor. Wonkette reached its largest pre-2008 audience during the 2006 midterm elections due to scandal coverage of Mark Foley and other incumbents involved in corruption, sex-abuse and bribery scandals.

After Pareene and Layne's departure in October 2007, a team of new editors including John Clarke, Jr. and Megan Carpentier was installed by Gawker management. Gawker publisher Nick Denton brought Layne back as sole editor two months later; Layne put in place the team of Jim Newell of IvyGate, videographer Liz Glover, former Gawker blogger Sara K. Smith, Columbia literary magazine The Blue and White editor Juli Weiner, and longtime contributors Princess Sparkle Pony (Peter Huestis) and Josh Fruhlinger, the Comics Curmudgeon.

Wonkette teams covered both the Denver DNC and St. Paul RNC conventions. Newell and columnist Josh Fruhlinger covered Barack Obama's inauguration in Washington. As with many political websites, readership hit new records between the November 2008 election and January 2009 inauguration.

Past and current guest editors and contributors include Reason Magazine editor Nick Gillespie, Washington Post reporter David Weigel, DCeiver editor and Huffington Post writer Jason Linkins, Gawker editor and The Awl founder Choire Sicha, New York comedian and author Sara Benincasa, Chicago artist and journalist Lauri Apple, Boston Globe political blogger Garrett Quinn, cartoonist Benjamin Frisch, and Vanity Fair online writer Juli Weiner.

In April 2011, Wonkette came under criticism after blogger Jack Stuef wrote a post that was interpreted as mocking Trig Palin for his having Down syndrome. The post suggested that Trig was possibly the result of incest between Todd Palin and Bristol Palin. In response, at least 14 advertisers, including major companies such as Ford, Toyota, Verizon, Nordstrom, and Papa John's, announced that they would exclude their network remnant advertising from Wonkette. Editor Ken Layne announced that Stuef was placed on probation and Stuef apologized for the post.

The name of the site is a play on the slang word wonk, meaning a "zealous student of political policy", adding the feminine ending to best describe founding editor Cox and as a play on the word "gazette."

=== Separation from Gawker Media ===
On April 14, 2008, Gawker Media announced that it was selling Wonkette and that Layne would remain managing editor and part owner. Gawker Media head Nick Denton attributed the sale to "hunkering down" before another dot com downturn and the Internet bubble bursts: "And, even if not, better safe than sorry; and better too early than too late..." Gawker's Silicon Valley gossip site, Valleywag, was merged with the flagship Gawker.com site; its popular music site, Idolator, was sold to Buzznet; and The Consumerist was sold to Consumers Union as part of the same divestiture effort.

Wonkette Media also launched Wonkabout, a D.C. culture guide, which ran from February 12, 2009 until April 28, 2011, and was edited by Arielle Fleisher.

In February, 2017, Wonkette went ad-free, and it is now supported by reader donations.

=== Move to Substack ===
In July 2023, Schoenkopf moved Wonkette to Substack, retaining its existing URL. She projected that the move would lower the site's hosting costs and possibly attract new readers.

== Reception ==
The Bloggies at SXSW selected Wonkette as Best Political Blog in 2005, 2006 and 2007. Wonkette was chosen as a top political blog by Vanity Fair and Real Simple in 2008. Wonkette won the Best Liberal Blog category in the 2008 Weblog Awards and is nominated in the humor, politics and group-blog categories in the 2009 and 2010 Bloggies. Items are frequently picked up by national broadcasts including Colbert Report, Wait, Wait Don't Tell Me and CNN.

Alex Nichols, writing in The Outline in 2017, described Wonkette, saying, "This is why I love Wonkette, the gossip blog that refuses to die. Wonkette is Bush-era liberalism frozen in amber, motionless and immortal, forced to passively observe a changing world until the end of time. Why does it still exist? Hard to say. But as long as it is here, we must celebrate its inanity." He wrote, "The site isn't an indictment of centrists, the Democratic Party, or neoliberalism. It doesn't prove a point about anything, and it isn't an example of any trend or political tendency, which makes it all the more baffling ... Wonkette simply exists, and it might outlast us all."
