= The Hoffman Agency =

Public relations firm based in California

- Type: Public relations firm
- Industry: Public relations
- Founded: 1987; 39 years ago
- Headquarters: San Jose, California
- Number of locations: 14
- Area served: Worldwide
- Key people: Lou Hoffman; Founder and CEO Caroline Hsu; Managing Director of Asia Pacific; Gerard LaFond; Managing Director of North America Jenny Fieldgate; Managing Director of Europe
- Number of employees: ~270 (2025)
- Website: hoffman.com

The Hoffman Agency is a global marketing and public relations agency headquartered in San Jose, CA that specializes in business-to-business technology. Its services include earned media, content marketing, social media, earned search, crisis communications, corporate communications, trainings, branding and design and employee branding and communications.

The firm has North American offices in San Jose, California; Portland, Oregon; and Boston, Massachusetts. Its Asia-Pacific offices are in Beijing, Shanghai, Shenzhen, Hong Kong, Taipei, Seoul, Tokyo, Singapore, Jakarta and Kuala Lumpur, and it has European offices in the UK, Germany and France. The Hoffman Agency has 270 employees globally, with 70 based in North America.

== History ==
The Hoffman Agency was founded in the U.S. in December 1987 by Lou Hoffman to provide communications services to technology companies, including Hewlett-Packard.

In 1993 the firm won the Silver Anvil Award for its work launching HP's miniature disk drive, Kittyhawk. In 1994 The Hoffman Agency initiated its first global campaign in launching Hyundai's (now known as Hynix) MPEG-2 chip in Europe and Asia Pacific.

The firm has been operating in Asia for over 20 years, beginning with the opening of its Singapore office in 1996. The company opened additional offices in Asia between 1996 and 2000, including those in Beijing, Hong Kong and Tokyo.

In 2000, the opening of the company's Beijing office made The Hoffman Agency the first Silicon Valley technology PR firm to enter mainland China.

The Hoffman Agency expanded to Europe in 2001 with the opening of an office in London.

Asia expansion continued with an office opening in Korea in 2001. In 2010 the company started an office in Shanghai, and in 2017 and 2018 opened additional offices in Jakarta and Taiwan.

The company has received more than 310 industry awards, including being selected by The Holmes Report as Tech Agency of the Year Finalist in 2014, 2015 and 2016 in the U.S., and Technology Consultancy of the Year in Asia in 2018. It was also named PRovoke SABRE Awards' Asia-Pacific Tech Agency of the year in 2021, 2022, and 2023, and PRovoke's Global Technology PR Agency of the year in 2023. In 2025, The Hoffman Agency was recognized as one of PRWeek's Best Places to Work for midsize agencies.

In April 2019, the agency formed an exclusive partnership with global communications firm Hotwire. Under the agreement, Hotwire collaborated with Hoffman's offices in Singapore, China, Hong Kong, Taiwan, Japan, Korea and Indonesia to provide public relations services to clients.

The Hoffman Agency launched its Techplomacy practice to provide tech-specific public affairs consulting for Asia-Pacific in October 2022. Also in 2022, The Hoffman Agency acquired Munich-based public relations firm Eloquenza, which specializes in designing communication strategies for B2B technology companies such as Workday and Confluent. As part of the merger, The Hoffman Agency founded the new The Hoffman Agency GmbH, bringing its total employees in Europe to 20.

In 2023, The Hoffman Agency announced its inaugural annual scholarship, offering one California Community College student two years of full tuition and fees for studying communications at a historically Black college or university (HBCU). Also in 2023, The Hoffman Agency named Dominique Rose Van-Winther as managing director for Asia Pacific, succeeding Caroline Hsu who transitioned to the role of chief global officer.

In 2024, The Hoffman Agency promoted Gerard LaFond to managing director of North America, succeeding Lou Hoffman, who remains at The Hoffman Agency as CEO. Additionally, The Hoffman Agency appointed Jenny Fieldgate as managing director of Europe in 2024. Fieldgate succeeds Mark Pinsent, who continues to be a senior consultant with the company.

In 2025, The Hoffman Agency acquired CCGroup, a PR-led tech marketing firm in London. CCGroup’s senior leaders, Richard Fogg and Paul Nolan, assumed the roles of co-managing directors reporting to Fieldgate.

In Southeast Asia, the agency operates under a #OneSEA model, launched to integrate teams across Indonesia, Malaysia, Singapore, and Thailand.

== Notable campaigns ==
Alcatel-Lucent

Bell Labs is the research and development subsidiary of Alcatel-Lucent founded by Alexander Graham Bell in 1925. The Hoffman Agency created a campaign around the Big Bang Bash, an event honoring the 50th anniversary of the research providing the first tangible evidence of "cosmic microwave background (CMB) radiation" — proving the Big Bang. The event was hosted by Bell Labs, whose researchers played an important role in confirming the scientific theory. The campaign resulted in over 220 million online impressions and was covered in publications such as the Huffington Post, NPR and Scientific American. As a result, The Hoffman Agency won the 2014 Holmes Report In2 SABRE Award in the Most Innovative Print and Digital Media category for this campaign.

City of Fremont

Since 2012, The Hoffman Agency has helped The City of Fremont, CA advance its economic development efforts and brand image. The Hoffman Agency won a 2014 In2 SABRE Award for its work with the City after launching the Think Silicon Valley website as the anchor to its overall communications campaign. The website has helped the City build relationships with local businesses and media, and established itself as a hub for advanced manufacturing, clean tech and life sciences. In addition, The Hoffman Agency has helped extend the City's reach beyond local press through media coverage in The Associated Press, The Washington Post, Bloomberg and CNET. As a result, The Hoffman Agency was shortlisted as a finalist in the 2015 SABRE Awards North America for its continued work with Fremont.

The Hoffman Agency also assisted the Fremont Police Department, announcing its custom Tesla Model S police patrol vehicle in January 2019. This resulted in 116 original and syndicated articles across various outlets including Mashable, Digital Trends, Quartz and Fox Business. The Hoffman Agency won a 2019 PRNEWS Award for this 24-hour campaign.

Invisalign Singapore

In 2020, Invisalign Singapore — a subsidiary of Align Technology — wanted to educate patients on clear aligner treatments as a medical procedure. Leveraging a study on the “Zoom Phenomenon,” which found 41% of individuals were more insecure of their smiles due to increased video calls stemming from COVID-19 lockdowns, The Hoffman Agency and Invisalign built a campaign consisting of additional studies and media events. This resulted in coverage in publications like Lianhe Zaobao, The Singapore Women's Weekly, August Man, Dental Asia, The Asian Parent and Men's Folio. The campaign won a 2022 PRCA APAC Award for health and wellbeing.

Lightship

In March 2023, America’s first all-electric recreational vehicle (RV) company, Lightship, launched its flagship battery-powered travel trailer: the Lightship L1. The Hoffman Agency conducted a launch campaign that resulted in media coverage in TechCrunch, The Verge, and Inside EVs. The campaign won a Platinum MarCom Award for Strategic Communications of a Product/Service Launch and a Platinum dotCOMM Award for Earned Media Article or News Placement.

Nautilus

Global fitness products company Nautilus, Inc. aimed to drive sales and bolster the company's brand as a home fitness innovator for the debut of the Bowflex Max Trainer cardio machine. The Hoffman Agency created a launch campaign, which resulted in media coverage from publications including TechCrunch, LA Times, Men's Fitness and USA Today. As a result, the agency submitted the product for recognition and gained two international design awards. To add to the Bowflex brand momentum, Hoffman created and launched the Bowflex Insider blog, which was named the best fitness blog by USAHomeGym and won an award from the Holmes Report as an innovative home media property.

Nokia

In January 2016, Nokia acquired Alcatel-Lucent and began integrating its technology across Nokia's existing portfolios in cloud, SDN and IP networks. The acquisition was finalized in November 2016. Hoffman has helped Alcatel-Lucent transition into new roles within Nokia and supported various business groups related to SDN, IP/optical networking, verticals, software, 5G/IoT and more. On the networking front, The Hoffman Agency has worked with Nokia on announcements such as the Photonic Service Engine 3 chipset launched in March 2018 that was covered by VentureBeat and ZDNet. Additionally, Hoffman coordinated with Nokia to invite media members to the Future X Lab facility in New Jersey in November 2018, resulting in articles by The Wall Street Journal, Network World and Wireless Week, among others.

NXP

Global semiconductor manufacturer NXP Semiconductors engaged The Hoffman Agency to lead media relations surrounding the company's product announcements at CES 2017. The campaign was covered in publications such as CNET, Digital Trends, Fast Company and TechRepublic. Based on the campaign, The Hoffman Agency was chosen as a finalist in the Trade Shows and Awards category at the 2018 North America IN2 SABRE Awards.

Trellix

During the 2020 U.S. presidential election, the Trellix Advanced Research Center identified a surge in malicious emails targeting county elections, notably in Arizona and Pennsylvania. The Hoffman Agency built a human-centric campaign to tell the story of election poll workers targeted by phishing, hardware/software vulnerabilities and advanced cyberattack methods. The campaign resulted in coverage in The Associated Press, CyberScoop, Nextgov, The Register, TIME and The Washington Post, among others.

Sony

Sony launched its High-Res Audio (HRA) website and product line hoping to reach millennials. The Hoffman Agency created a content marketing campaign that doubled the page views and won the 2017 PR News Agency Elite Awards in both the content marketing and search engine optimization categories.

Synaptics

Synaptics is a company that invents human interface technology. The Hoffman Agency created a campaign for its auto technology that allows vehicle access via fingerprints in both the U.S. and Chinese markets. The campaign resulted in coverage in USA Today and Detroit Free Press, and the Holmes Report shortlisted Hoffman in the Best in B2B Earned Media category for the IN2 SABRE Awards.

Zscaler

The Hoffman Agency helped prepare Zscaler for the first IPO of 2018. The campaign was covered in mainstream, local and security publications such as TechCrunch, Barron's, Financial Times and Business Insider.
