= David Saranga =

Israeli diplomat

- דוד סרנגה
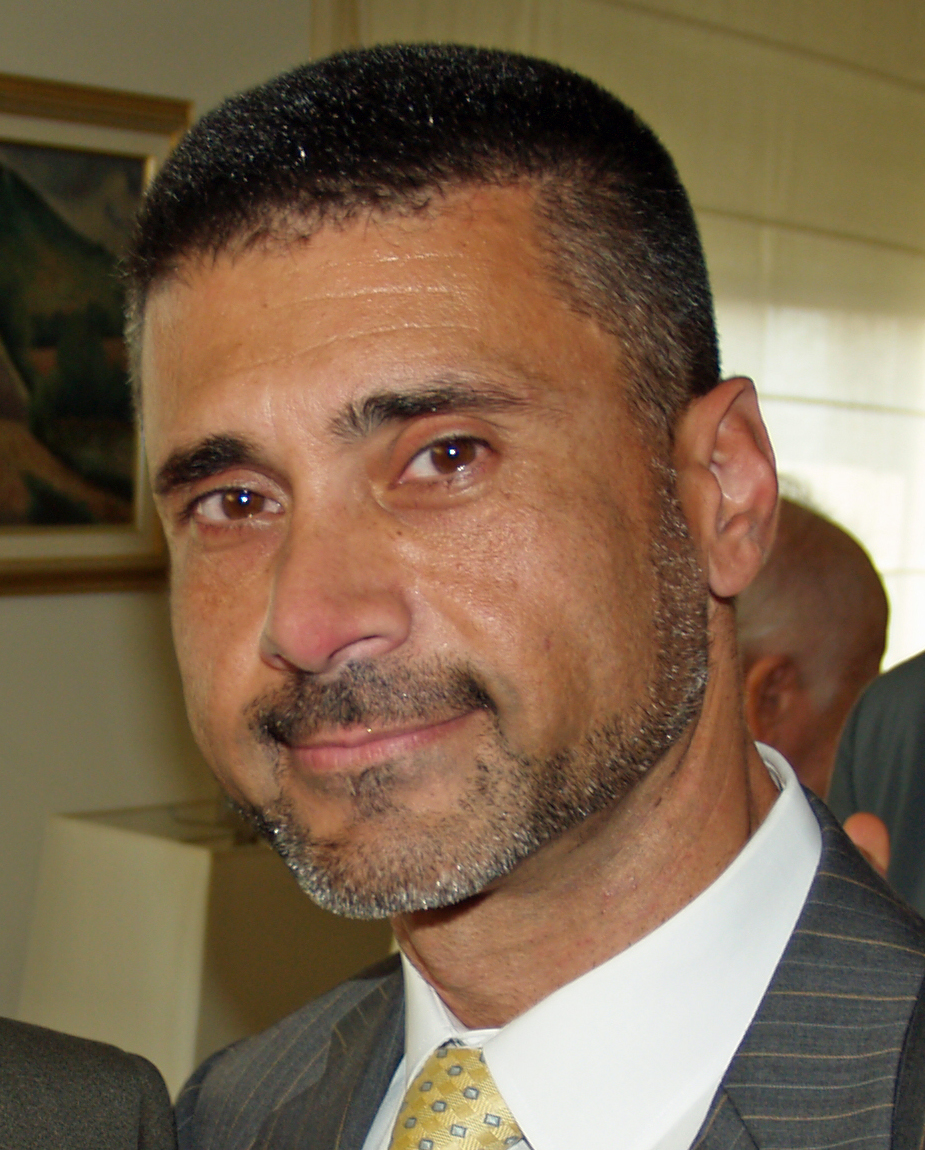
- David Saranga at a breakfast honoring Israeli writer Amos Oz in New York City (September 2008).
- Born: February 18, 1964 (age 62); Tel Aviv, Israel
- Education: Hebrew University of Jerusalem, B.A. in Social Sciences (1990); Hebrew University Business School, MBA (1993)
- Occupation: Diplomat

David Saranga (Hebrew: דוד סרנגה; born February 18, 1964) is an Israeli diplomat, Israel's former ambassador in Romania. He served as the Senior Foreign Affairs Advisor to the President of the State of Israel, Reuven (Ruvi) Rivlin, and former Head of European Parliament Liaison Department at the Israeli embassy in Brussels. Prior to that he served as Consul for Media and Public Affairs of Israel in the United States. Saranga was responsible for Israel's image in the United States and was the liaison person of Israel to the American media. The Jewish Chronicle described him as "The man whose campaigns are rebranding Israel." Saranga's initiative to invite Maxim magazine to Israel generated debate about the definition of public diplomacy. Prof. John H. Brown of Georgetown University described this initiative as the first event in a new branch of Public Diplomacy. Saranga was the first diplomat who implemented Web 2.0 governmental initiatives, including the first official blog of a country, a MySpace page, YouTube channel, Facebook page and a political blog.

Saranga fielded questions on behalf of Israel in what was the first government worldwide press conference via Twitter to take questions from the public about the December 2008 war with Hamas.

In March 2008, former Time Out Tel Aviv editor David Kaufman wrote a feature story about Israel's branding project, where he profiled the wide range of initiatives Saranga launched during his tenure in New York.

== Biography ==
Saranga was born in Tel Aviv. Prior to joining the Consulate in New York, Consul Saranga served as Deputy Spokesperson at the Ministry of Foreign Affairs in Jerusalem, and was responsible for all contacts with the foreign media based in Israel. During this period he was responsible for Israel's PR campaign around the International Court of Justice hearing in The Hague, regarding the Israeli West Bank barrier, and also was the person who coordinated and executed Christopher Reeve's visit to Israel in 2003.

Saranga has also served as the First Secretary for Media and Public Affairs at the Israel Embassy in Spain and as deputy ambassador at the Israel Embassy in Romania. He prepared for public service in the Israel Ministry of Foreign Affairs, where he studied Diplomacy and Political Economy. Saranga earned his B.A. degree from the Hebrew University Department of Social Sciences (1990), and he received his MBA degree from the Hebrew University Business School in 1993.

== 2008 Israeli war with Hamas ==
Saranga had a high profile during the Israeli airstrikes against Hamas. Particularly making headlines was Saranga's announcement that Israel would be the first government to hold a worldwide press conference via Twitter. In what The Jerusalem Post called "Battlefront Twitter", Saranga answered questions from the public about the war with Hamas.

After recording artist Yusuf Islam, formerly Cat Stevens, dedicated a song to the children of Gaza, Saranga criticized that the song was not dedicated to all the children of the region, including Israeli children who are victims of the violence.

== Publications ==
- Essay: If dialogue is a crime, we are all guilty, Jerusalem Post, Published April 16, 2009.
- "The Israel-Gaza war, by the numbers". New York Daily News. January 9, 2009. Archived from the original on January 21, 2009.
- Promoting Israel in a Downturn, The Jewish Week, Published December 17, 2008.
- 'Dance,' he told him, 'dance', Ynet News, Published September 22, 2008.
- Understanding Israel's Painful Decision, The Jewish Week, Published July 9, 2008.
- El plan saudí y la seguridad de Israel, Embajada de Israel, March 2002.
