= Online diary =

Personal blog

An online diary or web diary, is a personal diary or journal that is published on the World Wide Web on a personal website or a diary-hosting website.

== Overview ==
Online diaries have existed since at least 1994. As a community formed, these publications came to be almost exclusively known as online journals. Today they are almost exclusively called blogs, though some differentiate by calling them personal blogs. The running updates of online diarists combined with links inspired the term 'weblog' which was eventually contracted to form the word 'blog'.

In online diaries, people write about their day-to-day experiences, social commentary, complaints, poems, prose, illicit thoughts and any content that might be found in a traditional paper diary or journal. They often allow readers to contribute through comments or community posting.

Modern online diary platforms may allow the writer to make entries from a PC, tablet or smartphone. Writers might rate how they feel each day, invite someone to engage in a personal conversation or find counseling.

== Early history ==
Online diaries soon caught the attention of the media with the publication of the book 24 Hours in Cyberspace (1996) which captured personal profiles of the people involved in early web pages. The earliest book-length scholarly discussion of online diaries is Philippe Lejeune's Cher écran, ("Dear Screen").

In 1998, Simon Firth described in Salon magazine how many early online diarists were abandoning the form. Yet, he said, "While many of the movement's pioneers may be tired and disillusioned, the genre shows plenty of signs of life – of blossoming, even, into something remarkable: a new literary form that allows writers to connect with readers in an excitingly new way."

== Formation of a community ==
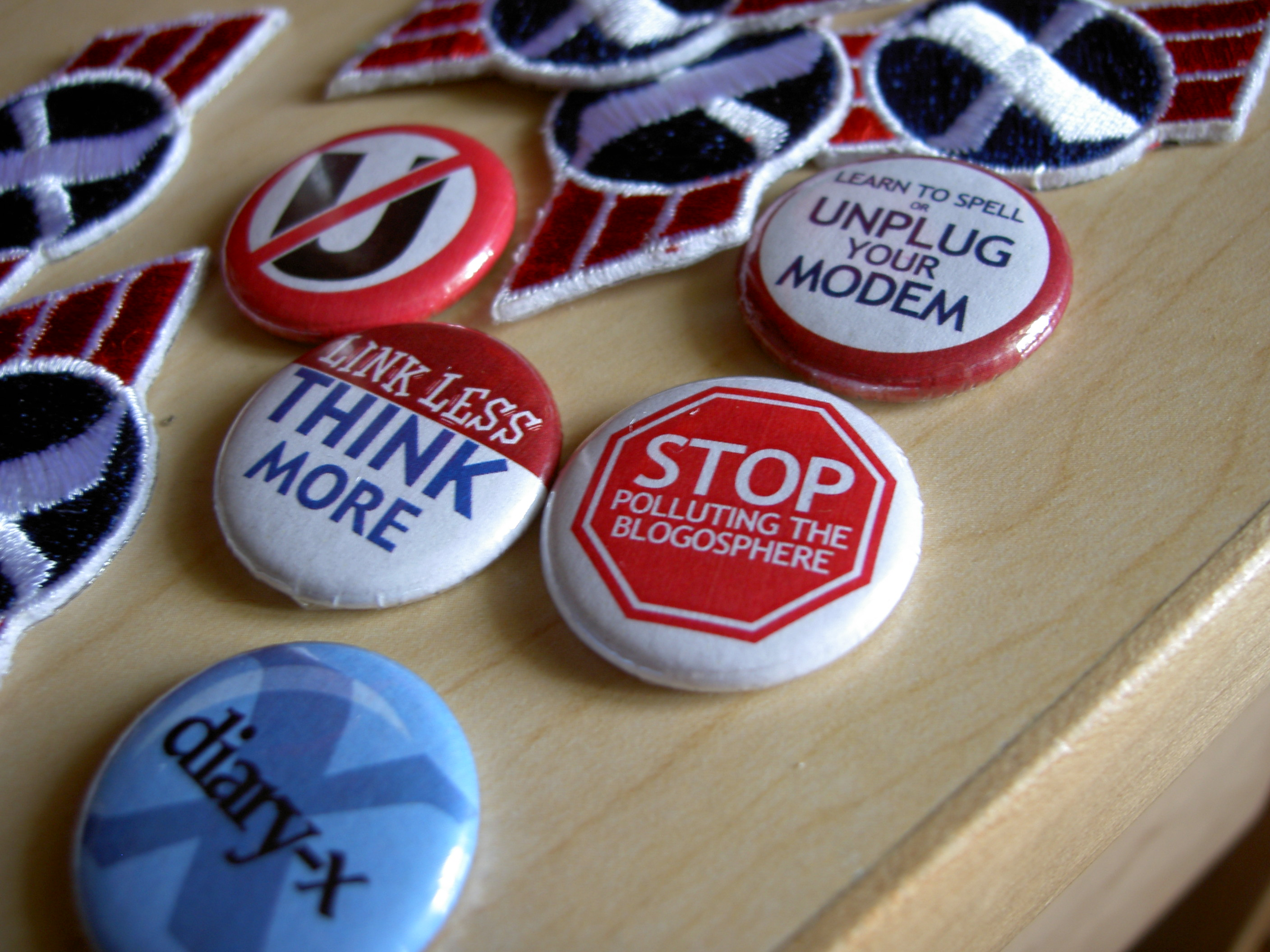
Diary-X buttons and patches

As diarists (sometimes called escribitionists) began to learn from each other, several Webrings formed to connect various diaries and journals; the most popular was Open Pages, which started in July 1996 and had 537 members as of 20 October 1998. A community website called Diarist.net was formed and awarded "The Diarist Awards" quarterly from 1999 through 2004. There were a number of lists of diaries and journals by topic, called "'burbs", which allowed people to find sites that had some correlation to each other.

Mailing lists helped solidify the community. "Collabs" were collaborative projects in which people wrote on given topics and subjects.

The launch of Open Diary in October 1998 provided the first website where online diaries could be posted together as a community. Open Diary innovated several features that would become important to online diary communities, including comments, activity feeds, and friends-only content.

Early online diary websites included Blogger, LiveJournal, Diary-X, and Diaryland. Dreamwidth launched in 2009, forked from the LiveJournal codebase.

== Technologies ==
Some early diaries and journals showcased different emerging internet technologies, including interactive message formats, online stores, RealAudio, RealVideo as on the early literary blogger's website nakednovelist.com (founded in 1990), live webcams, notify lists, and daily self-photographs.

Diaries and journals may feature podcasts, trackbacks, permalinks, blogrolls and a host of other technologies. With the popularization of mobile apps, diary or journaling apps have become available for iOS and Android. Proponents have cited numerous reasons for journaling using digital applications, including ease and speed of typing, mobile portability, and search capabilities. Digital diaries are also tailored towards shorter-form, in-the-moment writing, similar to user engagement with social media services such as Facebook, Twitter and Instagram.

== See also ==
- Blog software
- Digital scrapbooking
