= Donald Jarmon =

American baseball player

- Pitcher
- Born: April 30, 1914; Kinston, North Carolina
- Died: June 30, 1952 (aged 38)

Negro league baseball debut
- 1933, for the Columbus Blue Birds

Last appearance
- 1933, for the Columbus Blue Birds

Teams
- Columbus Blue Birds (1933)

Donald Ezra Jarmon (April 30, 1914 – June 30, 1952) was an American former Negro league pitcher who played in the 1930s.

A native of Kinston, North Carolina, Jarmon played for the Columbus Blue Birds in 1933.

In four recorded appearances on the mound, he posted an 11.37 ERA over 12.2 innings.
