= Ron Garmon =

American novelist

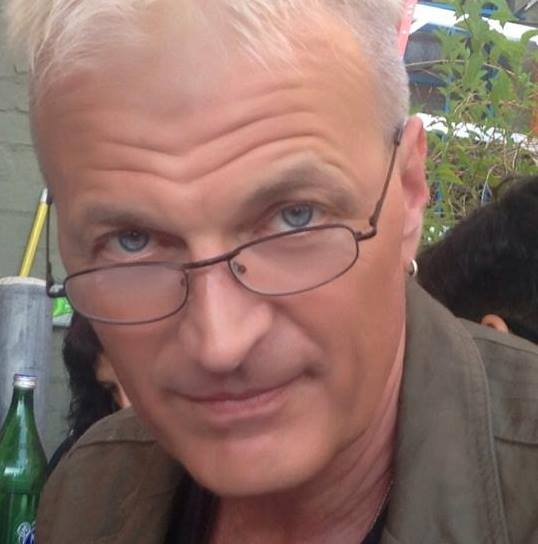
- Occupations: Journalist; writer; rock critic
- Writing career
- Pen name: Rocky Redglare
- Genres: Music journalism, speculative fiction, horror

Ron Garmon is an American journalist, rock critic, and short story writer who served as Arts Editor for L.A. CityBeat during its last year of publication, 2007 to 2008. He resides in Los Angeles.

Garmon's lyrical, oft-hallucinatory writings have been a fixture in L.A. rock journalism since the late 1990s through his scene columns in Mean Street, L.A. Record, and L.A. CityBeat. While at L.A. CityBeat, Garmon interviewed Jimmy Carter, Edward Albee, Carl Reiner and many more. Garmon's cover stories followed L.A.'s underground music scene, bringing to light the trashing of the iconic Morrison Hotel, and investigating the fate of long-vanished cult movie director Tom Graeff. He's possibly L.A.'s first medical marijuana critic, reviewing dispensaries and strains in the print edition of the L.A. Record. He contributed live music reviews, and under the heading 'Hear This While High' recommended pairings of recordings and marijuana strains, to the SF Weekly music blog "All Shook Down". 1" His byline has appeared in the Los Angeles Times, Famous Monsters of Filmland, Famous Monsters Underground #1, Brand X, Utne Reader, The Tracking Angle, Scarlet Street, New Angeles Monthly, and the Heinlein Journal. Examples of Garmon's approach to the rock LP can be found in Lost in the Grooves: Scram's Capricious Guide to the Music You Missed. He wrote liner notes for the CD reissues of The Best of Spirit and four Bootsy Collins albums.

His speculative fiction is published in Paraphilia and Antique Children. Garmon and fellow science fiction writer Brad Linaweaver were 2002 nominees for the Rondo Hatton Classic Horror Award for one of their "Left Brain/Right Brain" features in Cult Movies Magazine. His 1998 RetroVision article on radical filmmaker Peter Watkins was cited in A Companion to Science Fiction.

In 1999, Garmon and ex-Scarlet Street publisher Jessie Lilley founded Worldly Remains: A Pop Culture Review, which ran eight issues before folding in 2004. Popular culture icons such as Michael Parks, Ivan Dixon, Frankie Smith, Robert Quarry, Keith Morris, Gloria Hendry, and John Quade gave uncensored interviews. There was much quirky coverage of retromedia, and reporting on bizarre public events such as the 2000 Reform Party Convention.
