= James N. Farmer =

British businessman (born 1976)

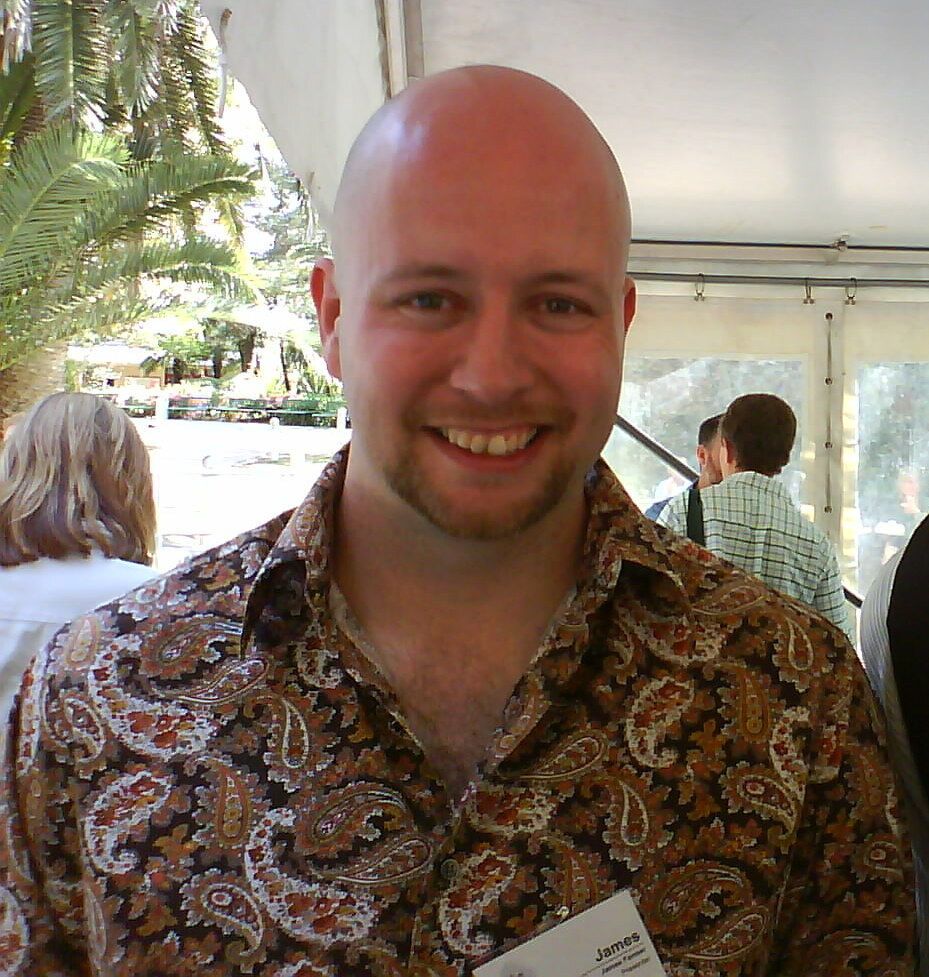
- At an event in September 2007
- Born: James Nicholas Farmer; 1976 (age 49–50); Birmingham, UK
- Occupations: Entrepreneur, writer

James Nicholas Farmer (born 1976, Birmingham, UK) is founder and CEO of Incsub, which includes the WordPress related companies of WPMU DEV, WPMU.org, and Edublogs.org, the largest global weblog community for educators. Farmer is currently based in Australia, where he has been the Online Community Editor of The Age, and Lecturer in Education Design at Deakin University. Farmer's blog, Incorporated Subversion, has been a resource for educators involved with social media and online publishing since 2003.

Edublogs.org hosts over 4.38 million separate weblogs, used by educators and students around the world.

Farmer is founder of The Edublog Awards, a series of educational weblog awards which have been run every year since 2004. The awards are now co-facilitated by James Farmer and Josie Fraser.

Farmer was one of the 3 organisers of BlogTalk Downunder, the first blogging conference in Australia. He also organized and ran the first WordCamp in Australia, WordCamp Melbourne.

In March 2009, he was quoted in The Herald Sun newspaper and on news.com.au regarding allegations of inappropriate advertising on Edublogs.org.

In March 2011, he was accused of copyright infringement.

== Presentations ==
- Speaker at BlogTalk DownUnder, "Centred Communication: Weblogs and aggregation in the organisation"
- Keynote speaker at ICTEV 2007
- Keynote speaker at efest 2008

== Publications ==
- Communication dynamics: Discussion boards, weblogs and the development of communities of inquiry in online learning environments
- Blogs @ Anywhere: High fidelity online communication
- Centred communication - Weblogs and aggregation in the organisation
