= Blogosphere =

Term

The blogosphere is made up of all blogs and their interconnections. The term implies that blogs exist together as a connected community (or as a collection of connected communities) or as a social networking service in which everyday authors can publish their opinions and views.

== History ==
The term was coined on September 10, 1999, by Brad L. Graham, as a joke. It was re-coined in 2002 by William Quick, and was quickly adopted and propagated by the warblogger community. The term resembles the older word logosphere (from Greek logos meaning word, and sphere, interpreted as world), "the world of words", the universe of discourse.

Despite the term's humorous intent, CNN, the BBC, and National Public Radio's programs Morning Edition, Day To Day, and All Things Considered used it several times to discuss public opinion. A number of media outlets in the late 2000s started treating the blogosphere as a gauge of public opinion, and it has been cited in both academic and non-academic work as evidence of rising or falling resistance to globalization, voter fatigue, and many other phenomena, and also in reference to identifying influential bloggers and "familiar strangers" in the blogosphere.

== Proliferation ==
In 1999, Pyra Labs opened blogging to the masses by simplifying the process of creating and maintaining personal web spaces. When they released "Blogger", the number of blogs in existence was thought to be less than one hundred. Blogger led to the birth of the wider blogosphere. In 2005, a Gallup poll showed that a third of Internet users read blogs at least on occasion, and in May 2006, a study showed that there were over forty-two million bloggers contributing to the blogosphere. With less than 1 million blogs in existence at the start of 2003, the number of blogs had doubled in size every six months through 2006.

In 2011, it was estimated that there were more than 153 million blogs, with nearly 1 million new posts being produced by the blogosphere each day.

=== Revenue ===
In a 2010 Technorati study, 36% of bloggers reported some sort of income from their blogs, most often in the form of ad revenue. This shows a steady increase from their 2009 report, in which 28% of the blogging world reported their blog as a source of income, with the mean annual income from advertisements at $42,548. Other common sources of blog-related income are paid speaking engagements and paid postings. Paid postings may be subject to rules on clearly disclosing commercial advertisements as such (regulated by, for example, the Federal Trade Commission in the US and the Advertising Standards Authority in the UK).

== As a social network ==
Sites such as Technorati, BlogPulse, and Tailrank track the interconnections between bloggers. Taking advantage of hypertext links which act as markers for the subjects the bloggers are discussing, these sites can follow a piece of conversation as it moves from blog to blog. These also can help information researchers study how fast a meme spreads through the blogosphere, to determine which sites are the most important for gaining early recognition. Sites also exist to track specific blogospheres, such as those related by a certain genre, culture, subject matter, or geopolitical location.

=== Mapping ===
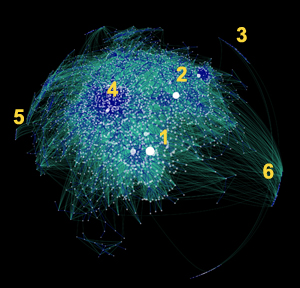
The blogosphere as a network of interconnections

In 2007, following six weeks of observation, social media expert Matthew Hurst mapped the blogosphere, generating the plot to the left based on the interconnections between blogs. The most densely populated areas represent the most active portions of the blogosphere. White dots represent individual blogs. They are sized according to the number of links surrounding that particular blog. Links are plotted in both green and blue, with green representing one-way links and blue representing reciprocal links.

DISCOVER Magazine described six major 'hot spots' of the blogosphere. While points 1 and 2 represent influential individual blogs, point 3 is the perfect example of "blogging island", where individual blogs are highly connected within a sub-community but lack many connections to the larger blogosphere. Point 4 describes a sociopolitical blogging niche, in which links demonstrate the constant dialogue between bloggers who write about the same subject of interest. Point 5 is an isolated sub-community of blogs dedicated to the world of pornography. Lastly, point 6 represents a collection of sports' lovers who largely segregate themselves but still manage to link back to the higher traffic blogs toward the center of the blogosphere.

=== Merging with other social networks ===
Over time, the blogosphere developed as its own network of interconnections. In this time, bloggers began to engage in other online communities, specifically social networking sites, melding the two realms of social media together.

According to Technorati's 2010 "State of the Blogosphere" report, 78% of bloggers were using the microblogging service Twitter, with much larger percentages of individuals who blogged as a part-time job (88%) or full-time for a specific company (88%). Almost half of all bloggers surveyed used Twitter to interact with the readers of their blog, while 72% of bloggers used it for blog promotion. For bloggers whose blog was their business (self-employed), 63% used Twitter to market their business. Additionally, according to the report, almost 9 out of 10 (87%) bloggers were using Facebook.

News blogs have become popular, and have created competition for traditional print newspaper and news magazines. The Huffington Post was ranked the most powerful blog in the world by The Observer in 2008, and has come to dominate current event reporting.

- Political blogs are often tied to a large media or news corporation, such as "The Caucus" (affiliated with The New York Times), "CNN Political Ticker", and the National Review's "The Corner".
- Gossip blogs have grown extensively with the development of the blogosphere. One of the first influential gossip bloggers was Perez Hilton, a celebrity and entertainment media gossip blogger. His blog posts tabloid photographs of celebrities, accompanied by captions and comments. Web traffic to the often controversial and raunchy Perez Hilton site increased significantly in 2005, prompting similar gossip blogs, such as TMZ.com to gain popularity.
- Food blogs allow chefs to share recipes, cooking techniques, and food porn. Food blogs such as 101 Cookbooks, Smitten Kitchen, and Simply Recipes can serve as online cookbooks for followers and often contain restaurant critiques, product reviews, and step-by-step photography for recipes.
- Fashion blogs have also become large sub-communities following the growth of the blogosphere. blogs like Racked, The Cut, and Fashionista give readers an eye into the fashion industry. Besides fashion news blogs, street style blogs have also become popular. Such bloggers include Scott Schuman (The Sartorialist), Tommy Ton (Jak and Jil), Jane Aldridge (Sea of Shoes), Bryan Grey-Yambao (Bryanboy), and Tavi Gevinson (Style Rookie). They are able to earn considerable livings through advertising, selling their photos and even providing their services as photographers, stylists, and guest designers.
- Health blogs cover health topics, events and/or related content of the health industry and the general community. A health blog can cover diverse health related concerns such as nutrition and diet, fitness, weight control, diseases, disease management, societal trends affecting health, analysis about health, business of health and health research.
- Scientific blogs cover different scientific and mathematical topics. Some of these are written by leading researchers, others by interested laymen. These are often free to access and thus provide an alternative to pay walled scientific literature.
- Genealogy blogs cover a variety of topics related to genealogy and family history, including the genealogy industry, genealogy software and technology, as well as educational "how to" posts related to specific research areas.
- Philosophy blogs both in analytic philosophy and Continental philosophy are a significant part of the blogosphere, often covering metaphysics, ethics and philosophy of language.

== See also ==
- Bloggernacle
- Customer engagement
- Global Voices Online
- Group blogging
