= Jessica Cutler =

American journalist (born 1978)

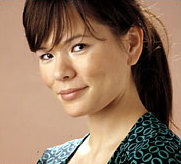
- Born: Jessica Louise Cutler; May 18, 1978 (age 48); Monterey, California, U.S.
- Education: Syracuse University
- Occupations: Author, blogger
- Spouse: Charles Rubio (m. 2008)
- Children: 1

Jessica Louise Cutler (born May 18, 1978) is an American blogger, author, and former congressional staff assistant who was fired for detailing her active sexual life, including receiving money for having sex (prostitution), in her blog.

== Career ==
=== Education ===
Cutler was born on May 18, 1978, in Monterey, California. She attended Syracuse University, and was a photo editor at the student newspaper, The Daily Orange.

=== Washingtonienne ===
In 2004, while a staff assistant for Senator Mike DeWine, Cutler published a short-lived blog called Washingtonienne describing her life in Washington, D.C. which included graphic details of her sex life.

Cutler justified receiving money from her lovers by saying, "I'm sure I am not the only one who makes money on the side this way: How can anybody live on $25K/year??"

Her identity was revealed by the blog "Wonkette" in May 2004, which resulted in a scandal on Capitol Hill.

On May 21, 2004, Cutler was fired for "unacceptable use of Senate computers" by Senator DeWine. Media treatment of Cutler was harsh, the Philadelphia Daily News going so far as to label her a "DC slut". Cutler, though, has been relatively accepting of her notoriety:

Public embarrassment is really very liberating. You really stop caring about what people think, which is something only the elderly seem to able to accomplish with great aplomb. So I am way ahead of everybody. And those of you behind me can kiss my ass.

In summer 2004, Playboy.com featured an interview and nude pictures of Cutler.

She wrote a novel based on her experiences and blog: The Washingtonienne: A Novel, selling it for a reported $300,000. A reviewer for the Washington Post wrote, "The Washingtonienne gives hints of being lively, funny and agreeably in-your-face." Judy Bachrach of The Weekly Standard wrote, "This is a novel of uncommon candor, humor, and perspicacity, and I loved every page of it."

=== Steinbuch lawsuit ===
In June 2005, Robert Steinbuch, who says that he is the person Cutler referred to as "RS" on her blog, filed a lawsuit against her, seeking over $75,000 in damages. Steinbuch's complaint and related filings, filed in federal court in Washington, D.C., describe the case as for "defamation," "false light," "invasion of privacy for public revelation of private facts," the "intentional infliction of emotional distress," and "other causes of action." Cutler is represented by Atlanta lawyer, Matthew C. Billips, and D.C. lawyer, John R. Ates. On May 30, 2007, Cutler filed for bankruptcy in an attempt to protect herself from potential debts. Listed among potential creditors were some of her former attorneys, as well as Steinbuch. At the time she filed for bankruptcy, staying the case in the DC District Court, a motion to dismiss—as a sanction against Steinbuch for refusing to comply with Court Ordered discovery—was still pending.

Steinbuch also filed a $20 million suit against her in Arkansas, where he lives and works as a law professor. The lawsuit was eyed closely by privacy groups because it could establish whether bloggers are obligated to protect the privacy of those they name in their online public blogs. The Arkansas case was dismissed for forum non-conveniens by the district court. However, the United States Court of Appeals reversed the district judge in Arkansas, holding that he abused his discretion and ruled incorrectly. Eventually, after the case was sent back to the district judge in Arkansas, the district judge transferred the case to another judge.

It was reported in 2007 that cable television channel HBO and entertainment company Disney, whom Steinbuch also sued, are working on a TV series about Cutler's story.

According to the New York Law Journal, Steinbuch was ordered to reimburse discovery expenses regarding a deposition to Cutler's attorney Billips in June 2009. Billips has filed an affidavit requesting over $14,000 in fees and expenses.

== Personal life ==
In 2008, she married Charles Rubio, a lawyer, in New York City. She gave birth in August 2009 to a daughter, Jessica-Louise.

== Books ==
- The Washingtonienne: A Novel. Hyperion Books (2005). Hardcover: ISBN 978-1-4013-0200-9, ISBN 978-1-4013-0847-6.
- Sexe au Capitole. Plon (2006). ISBN 978-2-259-20172-8.
