= Vlog =

Form of blog for which the medium is video

A vlog, also known as a video blog or video log, is a form of blog for which the medium is video. Vlog entries often combine embedded video (or a video link) with supporting text, images, and other metadata. Entries can be recorded in one take or cut into multiple parts. Like traditional blogging, video blogging (or vlogging) focuses on personal topics centering on the creator. For example, makeup routines, book recommendations, and recipe videos.

There are two main styles of vlog: a "talking-head" video, in which the camera stays steady while the vlogger talks about a subject, and a "follow me around" vlog, in which the vlogger takes a camera with them and records clips as they go about their day or week. Video logs (vlogs) also often take advantage of web syndication to allow for distribution of the video over the Internet, using either the RSS or Atom syndication formats, for automatic aggregation and playback on mobile devices and personal computers (video podcast). The vlog category is popular on the video-sharing platform YouTube.

== History ==
In the 1980s, New York artist Nelson Sullivan documented his experiences travelling around New York City and South Carolina by recording videos in a distinctive vlog-like style. On January 2, 2000, Adam Kontras posted a video alongside a blog entry aimed at informing his friends and family of his cross-country move to Los Angeles in pursuit of show business, marking the first post on what would later become the longest-running video blog in history. In November of that year, Adrian Miles posted a video of changing text on a still image, coining the term vog to refer to his video blog. Filmmaker and musician Luuk Bouwman started in 2002 the now-defunct Tropisms.org site as a video diary of his post-college travels, one of the first sites to be called a vlog or videolog. In 2004, Steve Garfield launched his own video blog and declared that year "the year of the video blog".

=== YouTube ===
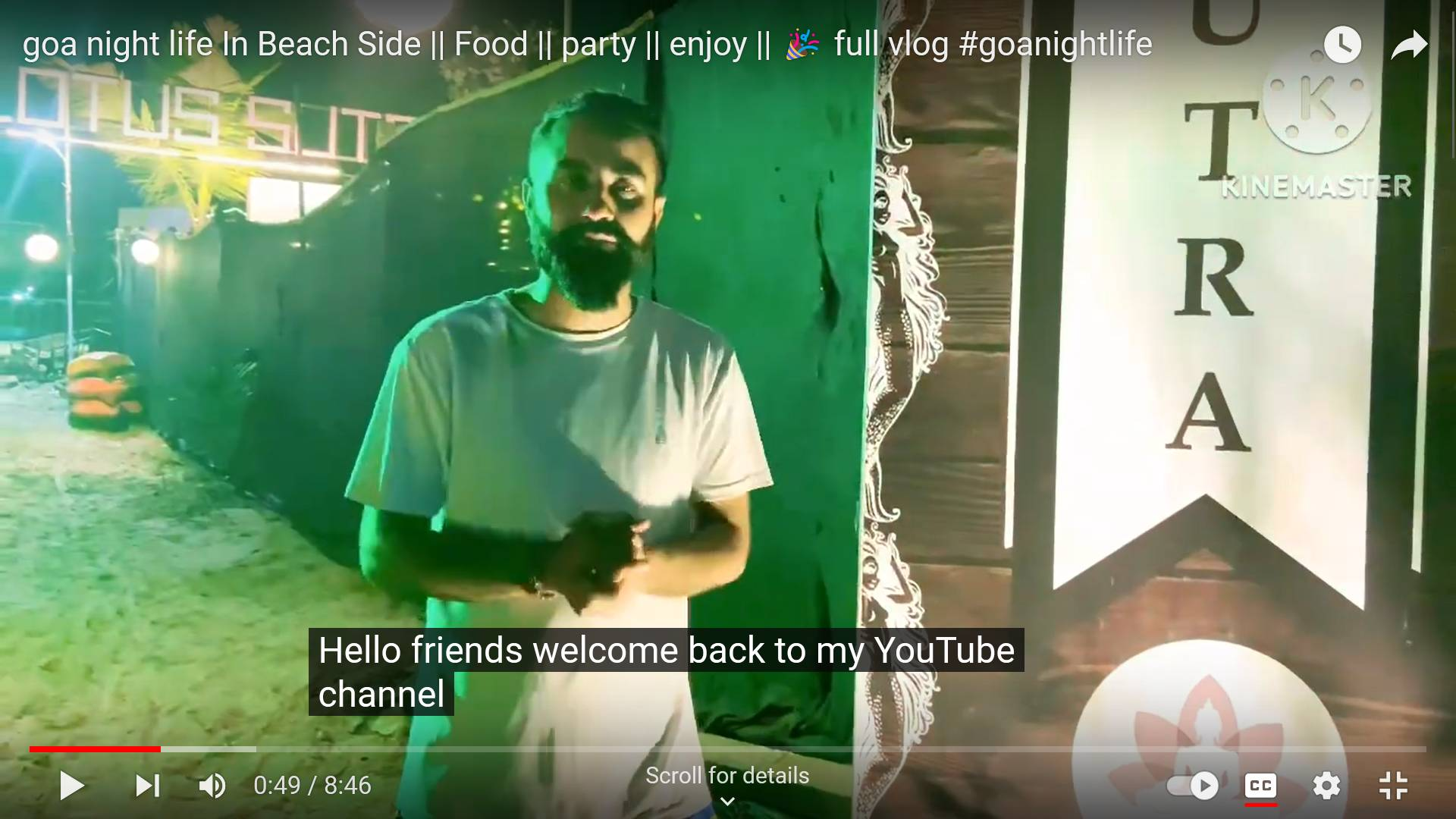
A YouTube vlogger greeting his audience

Vlogging saw a strong increase in popularity beginning in 2005. The most popular video sharing site, YouTube, was founded in February 2005. The site's co-founder Jawed Karim uploaded the first YouTube vlog clip Me at the zoo on his channel "jawed" in April 2005. The ordinary "everydayness" and "dry aesthetics" of Me at the zoo set the tone for the type of amateur vlogging content that would become typical of YouTube, especially among YouTubers. By July 2006, YouTube had become the fifth most popular web destination, with 100 million videos viewed daily and 65,000 new uploads per day. The Yahoo! Videoblogging Group also saw its membership increase dramatically by August 2005.

Many open source content management systems enabled the inclusion of video content, allowing bloggers to host and administer their own video blogging sites. In addition, the convergence of mobile phones with digital cameras allows publishing of video content to the Web almost as it is recorded. Vloggers on YouTube have formed social communities by sharing personal experiences and fostering emotional connections with viewers. The effect of this emotional exchange between strangers has been documented, for example, in the popularity of bereavement vlogs, in which grieving individuals reassure each other through friendly comments.

=== Miscellaneous events ===
- 2005, January – Vloggercon, the first vlogger conference, is held in New York City.
- 2006, November – Irina Slutsky created and hosted The Vloggies, the first annual video blog awards.
- 2007, May and August – The Wall Street Journal places a grandmother on the front page of its Personal Journal section. In August 2007, she was featured on an ABC World News Tonight segment showing the elderly now becoming involved in the online video world.

=== Guinness World Record ===
In May 2019, Charles Trippy was awarded the Guinness World Record for the "Most Consecutive Daily Personal Video Blogs Posted On YouTube", having recorded 3653 consecutive videos to his Charles and Allie YouTube channel over the previous ten years.

== International development ==
=== South America ===
South American countries like Brazil have a unique development path of vlog. Until January 2025, data shows that Brazil 144 million social media users as home to 144 million social media users which makes up 67.8% of the total population. The existence of vlog in Brazil was a companion of the localization of YouTube, with more YouTube channels and creators focusing on Brazilian culture. For example, Felipe Neto (third channel in Table 1) created his channel in 2006 as a vlog, following typical modes of address and aesthetics that are part of this content type.

The emergence of vlog was a rebellion against the traditional Brazilian media, as the newspapers and TV Globo defined "who Brazilians are" by telling stories about white, heterosexual, high-income people. YouTube vlogs enabled individuals, especially those marginalized, to share their lives and speak up for themselves. It is noteworthy that many of the popular videos on Brazilian YouTube are at least partially targeted to the young CDE (Critério de Classificação Econômica Brasil, classification representing the low-income and working-class families in Brazil) classes' audience.

The popularity of vlogs on YouTube is not only a result of providing a platform for the marginalized to speak up, but also spreading out hidden messages related to social justice. Porta dos Fundos (Backdoors) is a professional independent audio-visual media producer who became famous on YouTube for producing sketch comedies that have a distinct type of humour than the traditional shows on Brazilian television. The channel addresses taboo topics in Brazil, like racism and misogyny, and challenges the monopoly of main stream TV company Globo.

=== Europe ===
There are fewer academic articles about the European development of vlogs. The European Union enabled several strict internet regulations. For instance, the Digital Services Act mandates greater transparency and accountability to platforms in order to protect users' privacy. Similarly, the General Data Protection Regulation (GDPR) requires platforms to ask for users' consent before enabling algorithm and collecting data. In addition, Europe's linguistic diversity makes the social media landscape more fragmented compared to larger markets like the U.S. and China. Content must be tailored not only to language but also to cultural contexts. Commentators suggest that formal and direct communication is favored by the German audience but Spanish viewers prefer conversational tone.

Despite the strict regulations on social media and a diverse audience, there are influential vloggers who brought this new way of narrative into the European market. SQUEEZIE (Lucas Hauchard), a French vlogger, has over 18 million followers on YouTube. He was known for his interactive travel vlogs. For another example, Kwebbelkop (Jordi van den Bussche) is a Dutch YouTuber who has 15 million followers. His vlogs include games, challenges, and comedic skits.

=== Asia ===
==== China ====
China has a different social media landscape than the United States. While the US audience use YouTube, Instagram, TikTok as the main short video platforms, Chinese audience immerse with Douyin (Chinese version of TikTok), Bilibili, Xiaohongshu (Red Note), WeChat channel, etc.

Later than the U.S., vlogging culture has experienced rapid growth in China since 2018. And unlike the US whose vlogs form of narratives were developed from bottom-to-up, Chinese video-sharing and social media platforms launched a series of campaigns and favourable policies to promote vlogging. For example, Bilibili has launched a campaign called "Everybody can be a vlogger" with a slogan: "A vlog is more than just a record of life, it is an expression of the extraordinary in ordinary life! Become a vlogger, now! We have created the following courses tailored to the student/worker/couple vlogger status, so start your vlogging journey!" To encourage users to participate, the platform offers participants with rewards that are rarely received, one of the most important promises is visibility.

The popularity of vlogs invited the engagement of traditional media. Well-known anchors from official news outlets start their own channels or accounts. For example, Kang Hui, a news anchor at CCTV (China Central Television), started his own channel named "Kang Hui vlog". Through his channel, audiences are allowed to watch Kang Hui telling news stories by taking his audience to his workplace and the news sites. The program offer a sense of reality, interactivity, and personalized explanations, bringing hosts closer to viewers and making the format popular.

The landscape of vlogs in China has a diverse range of contents: travelling, studying aboard, lifestyle sharing, etc. Some content creators play a role of communicating Chinese culture to the world through individual narratives. Li Ziqi, a Chinese vlogger who was known internationally for creating Chinese traditional food and handicraft production. Her videos shows the rest of the world about "Chineseness", including the rural customs, aesthetics, and cultural and scenic places. Beyond simply showcasing "Chineseness" to global audiences, the food making and rural lifestyle, as Liang said, also embodies a contemporary "structure of feeling" in China: urban residents' desire for a simple and authentic lifestyle in countryside. With the popularity of Li's videos, she also converted the success to e-commerce ventures, bring new economic energy into rural regions, which aligned with Chinese policy of Rural Revitalization.

==== Japan ====
Japanese vloggers are called "J-vloggers". The rise in J-vlogging is part of the rise of YouTube in Japan around 2016. Marc Lefkowitz, YouTube's head of creator and artist development for Asia-Pacific, said that the content uploaded from YouTube channels in Japan has more than doubled between 2016 and 2017. Rachel and Jun, an American and Japanese married couple, make a living by creating travelling vlogs for their 1.8 million followers on YouTube. Lefkowitz said "Tourism numbers are rising at lightning speed – 250% between 2012 and 2017. This is particularly interesting to me as it correlates with the rise of J-vlogging....People want to virtually travel here, learn more about the food, customs and culture."

== Uses ==
=== Impressions ===
Vlogs have made it possible to learn about a vlogger's persona, culture, and impressions using non-verbal hints. Researchers have conducted experiments using crowdsourcing for Amazon Mechanical Turk to determine what kind of personality traits the vlogger might have. Many vlogs have been personified by five big personality traits such as extraversion, conscientiousness, agreeableness, neuroticism, and openness to experience. Along with Mechanical Turk, researchers also looked at the cues that take place within vlogs. Vlogs can be broken down to their elements considering that there are a lot of factors that play in the creation of one such as placement of camera, lighting, location, amount of time spent looking at the camera, pitch, delivery and amount of the interactions. Using this information and crowdsourcing, results have revealed that the highest rate in personality research was agreeableness which makes vlogging a great place to form agreeable impressions. However, more non-verbal hints are more noticeable in other form traits such as extraversion. Regardless, personality impressions have made a more interesting vlog viewing experience.

=== Education ===
Vlogging has been experimented with school systems to determine if it is a reliable platform to deliver higher educational practices to students. Researchers have done an experiment that placed 42 college freshmen into a control and experimental group of 21 each. Oral proficiency exams were given to all students to reflect their current speech skills, after a year of teachings based on each of the groups preference. The control group was instructed to work with their standard writing skills and create their own blogs, while the experimental group tested their skills with online interaction. Scores for both groups had increased after both tests, however the experimental group had outperformed the control group due to the improvement of speech proficiency that came as a result of a more interactive learning environment between teachers and classmates. The control group claimed that not using video blogs "lowered their confidence" in their speaking proficiency.

=== Health ===
Researchers have investigated how vlog-style YouTube videos made by creators who suffer from chronic illnesses can raise health awareness among viewers and create social communities among those suffering. A 2014 study evaluated the contextual relationship between vloggers who shared that they had diabetes, cancer, or human immunodeficiency virus (HIV) and their audiences. Most of the creators of these vlogs chose to focus their videos on how disease diagnosis and treatment had impacted them physically and emotionally. Commenters on the vlogs who shared personal characteristics formed ad hoc small groups; these impromptu support groups expanded over time as more and more people discovered the health vlogs.

=== Women's rights ===
Vlogging is used by both feminist and anti-feminist voices to share their points of view. For the former, vloggers such as Hayla Ghazal who is based in Dubai, use humour to point our disparities between attitudes to genders in their country. The latter might involve "tradwife" content, for example.

=== Cultural exchange ===
The short video platforms enable private individuals to share their authentic lives. With the growing popularity of vlogs, more vloggers share their trips on platforms, which allow viewers to experience the local culture vicariously and enhance cross-cultural understanding. Travel vloggers usually share details about their trips including food, social norms, interpersonal interactions which traditional tourism media may overlook. Through authentic and comprehensive narratives, the vloggers play the role of reproducing the images of destinations, even changing people's travel intentions.

Vlog narratives boost a new form of marketing planning. Marketing researchers have found storytelling like vlog is more effective than factual arguments and statistics in brand communication, because it facilitates memory storage by providing context and meaning to information, making it more accessible to the human brain. According to systematic reviews of research on travel video materials, the audience's response are mainly affected by the destination image, which refers to 'a holistic mental picture, a sum of beliefs, ideas, and impressions that a person has about a destination.

== Live broadcasting ==
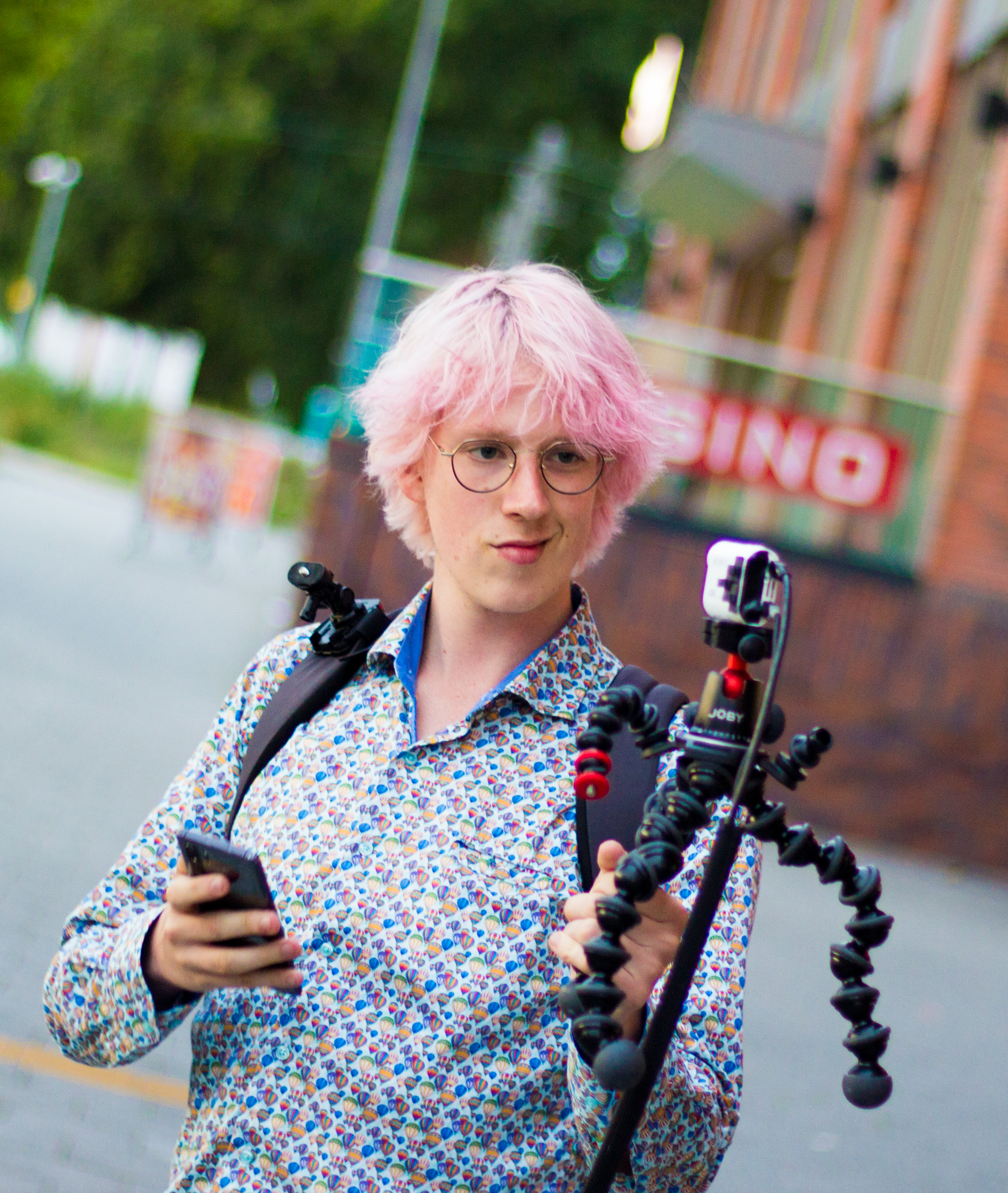
A Twitch streamer broadcasting live

YouTube announced a live broadcasting feature called YouTube Live in 2008. This feature was also established by other social platforms such as Instagram, Facebook and Twitch.

== YouTube presence ==
YouTube currently ranks among the top three most-visited sites on the web. As a high traffic area for video bloggers, or vloggers, YouTube has created a platform for these participants to present their personal videos, which oftentimes are filmed using hand held point and shoot cameras. The popularity of vlogs in the YouTube community has risen exponentially in the past few years; out of the top 100 most subscribed YouTube channels, 17 provide vlogs as their primary style of footage. Many of these vloggers are a part of the YouTube Partner Program, which professionalizes the industry and allows for monetary gain from video production. This professionalization additionally helps increase exposure to various channels as well as creates a sense of stability within the field. Additionally, this professionalization allows content creators to be deemed a credible source by their viewers. Furthermore, many vloggers have been able to turn their channels into sustainable careers; in 2013, the highest paid vlogger brought in a minimum of $720,000 for the year. Hollywood is taking notice of this rising medium, and has placed its value ranked over other entertainment companies such as Marvel, which is also owned by Disney.

== Privacy concerns and regulations ==
In the Fourth Industrial Revolution, Artificial Intelligence (AI) algorithms played an anchor role in the short video ecosystem. Algorithm tools like Supply Side Platforms trace users' behavior and offer personal recommendations. It is considered as a better service, while concerns about privacy invasion are raised at the same time. The General Data Protection Regulation (GDPR) is applicable as of May 25, 2018, in all member states of the European Union to harmonize data privacy laws across Europe. The regulation stipulated transparency. For example, in Chapter 3 Section 3 Article 17, users have the right to erasure ('right to be forgotten'). "The data subject shall have the right to obtain from the controller the erasure of personal data concerning him or her without undue delay and the controller shall have the obligation to erase personal data without undue delay." Another EU law, the Digital Services Act (DSA) also requires transparency. Platforms are obligated to explain how the algorithm works, and offer the users an option of non-profiling recommendation.

== See also ==
- History of blogging
- Lifecasting (video stream)
- Livestream
- Parasocial interaction
- Photoblog
- Video podcast
- vBook
