= Remezcla =

American media company

Remezcla, LLC
- Industry: Mass media
- Founded: 2006; 20 years ago
- Founders: Claire Frisbie, Nuria Net, Andrew Herrera
- Headquarters: Brooklyn, NY, United States
- Number of locations: 3: Los Angeles; Mexico City
- Key people: Andrew Herrera (CEO)
- Services: Digital publishing; creative agency; entertainment
- Website: remezcla.com

Remezcla is an American media company and online publication focused on Latin American culture in the United States. Founded in New York City in 2006 by Claire Frisbie, Nuria Net, and Andrew Herrera, it began as a newsletter and blog covering music and culture before expanding into digital publishing, advertising, video production, events, and branded content. The company is headquartered in Brooklyn, New York, and maintains offices in Los Angeles and Mexico City.

== History ==
Remezcla emerged in New York City in the mid-2000s as a project among writers and creatives seeking greater coverage of Latin music and Latino culture. It was founded in 2006 by Claire Frisbie, Nuria Net, and Andrew Herrera. Frisbie and Net, who were involved in New York's Latin alternative music scene, contributed to the project's early editorial work, while Herrera handled its finances. Remezcla initially operated as a newsletter and blog focused on Latin music and culture in New York. In 2008, it launched a magazine bearing the Remezcla name as the publication expanded its coverage and operations and entered into commercial partnerships, including a reported $100,000 agreement with Microsoft's Zune music service. Frisbie left the company in 2009, followed by Net in 2010.

By 2012, Remezcla had expanded beyond editorial publishing to include an agency business. The company relaunched its website in 2014 with sections devoted to sports, film, and food and expanded its multimedia production. By 2016, it had developed into a media, advertising, and entertainment company. That year, La Opinión reported that Remezcla had moved its headquarters to Bushwick, Brooklyn, and had approximately 35 employees.

In August 2017, Remezcla announced a Series A financing round of up to $11 million, which the company said would support the expansion of its video production and digital video operations. Global Venturing reported that Remezcla had been bootstrapped since its founding and operated both an online media platform and advertising and entertainment businesses. In 2019, Remezcla joined The Black List and several Latino organizations in establishing The Latinx List, an initiative intended to identify Latino screenwriters and promote Latino representation in Hollywood.

In February 2023, multicultural media company My Code acquired a minority stake in Remezcla. According to MediaPost, Remezcla remained a separate entity and continued to be majority-owned by its existing owners. The investment was intended to expand the companies' advertising, technology, and research capabilities and brought Remezcla into My Code's broader portfolio of multicultural media properties. Remezcla described itself at the time as a digital publisher and creative agency and said it reached an audience of 15 million U.S. Latinos.

In 2024, Remezcla launched a beauty vertical in partnership with Sephora, adding beauty to its existing coverage of music, culture, sports, film, and food. My Code subsequently expanded Remezcla's business into a broader Hispanic media offering through Remezcla Media Group, which incorporated Remezcla alongside other media properties and publishing partners. In October 2024, Remezcla Media Group entered into a strategic partnership with the National Football League to develop Latino-focused content and marketing initiatives. In 2025, Remezcla expanded its streaming presence with Remezcla Más, a free ad-supported television (FAST) channel available through the Roku Channel.

== Editorial coverage ==
Remezcla covers music, film, television, art, food, and lifestyle, as well as topics including race, identity, politics, and Latino representation. In 2014, Latino USA described Remezcla as part of a new generation of digital media outlets seeking to integrate Latino culture into mainstream American culture rather than treating it as a separate media niche. It characterized Remezcla's audience as younger and bicultural.

Music has been a major area of Remezcla's coverage. In 2017, Forbes reported that the site's music channel had contributed to an approximately 60 percent increase in unique visitors during 2016. The same article discussed music editor Isabelia Herrera's editorial partnership with NPR and her role in establishing Apple Music's first partnership with a Latino curator.

== Workplace culture controversy ==
In June 2020, Jezebel published an investigation into Remezcla's workplace culture based on interviews with twelve former employees. They described heavy workloads, inadequate management, and what they characterized as verbal and psychological abuse by co-founder and CEO Andrew Herrera, as well as inappropriate treatment of female employees. Herrera disputed some allegations but acknowledged shortcomings in job descriptions, feedback, and management. The investigation also highlighted the contributions of co-founders Nuria Net and Claire Frisbie, who had left the company by 2010, to Remezcla's early development. The reporting prompted former employees and contributors to form the #CleanUpRemezcla collective, which called for changes to the company's leadership and workplace practices, including Herrera's resignation. In July 2020, Herrera issued a public apology and announced changes to the company's leadership structure and the establishment of a human resources function. Executive editor Eduardo Cepeda left the company, while members of the collective continued to criticize the company's response and call for Herrera's resignation.

== Reception and influence ==
Remezcla has been described as an innovative digital media model serving younger Latino audiences, with the Craig Newmark Graduate School of Journalism at the City University of New York reporting more than 80 million annual visits to the outlet. Academic research has identified Remezcla as an important source of exposure for media representing intersectional Latino identities. A 2020 study published in Social Media + Society found that Remezcla was a major driver of traffic to the web series Brown Girls and provided more exposure for Brujos than any other site examined. Remezcla has also been studied as a site of debate over Latinx and Latine identity. A 2025 study in the Journal of Sociolinguistics analyzed social-media responses to a Remezcla post. Remezcla's coverage has also been cited by mainstream media, including the Los Angeles Times, in reporting on Latino identity and culture.

== Awards and recognition ==
Remezcla has received awards for its editorial, branded-content, and marketing work. It received early recognition for its branded-content and marketing work, winning an Ex Award in 2014 for a Heineken campaign and a Gold REGGIE Award in 2015 for Heineken Champions Express.

In 2019, Remezcla won a Webby Award in the Best Social Video: Food & Drink category for its video "Chinese Latinos Explain Chino-Latino Food." The same year, Remezcla received two Clio Sports Silver Awards for ESPN Deportes' "Super Tazón Ad", in the Public Relations and Integrated Campaign categories. In 2020, Remezcla received ANA Multicultural Excellence Awards Grand Prizes in the Audio and Hispanic categories for work for Tecate. In 2021, it received another Grand Prize in the Audio category for Jack Daniel's "New Calle". In 2023, Remezcla won a Silver Cannes Lion in the Entertainment Lions for Sport category for "Las Diablillas", a short documentary produced for Major League Baseball as part of the Fuera del Ballpark series. In 2024, Remezcla received three Bronze Clio Music Awards for "ALTA SINFÓNICA", a campaign for Tecate ALTA. In 2025, Remezcla won Gold and Silver Clio Sports awards for Major League Baseball's Béisbol Origin Stories. That year, it also received four wins at the ANA Multicultural & Inclusive Marketing Excellence Awards for work with Toyota North America and Major League Baseball.
