= History of blogging =

Although the term "blog" was not coined until the late 1990s, the history of blogging can be traced to earlier forms of online communication. Before "blogging" became widespread, users shared content and participated in online communities through platforms such as Usenet, commercial online services including GEnie, Byte Information Exchange (BIX), and CompuServe, as well as e-mail lists and Bulletin Board Systems (BBS).

== 1983–1993 ==
Usenet was the primary serial medium included in the original definition of the Internet. It features the moderated newsgroup which allowed all posting in a newsgroup to be under the control of an individual or small group. Most such newsgroups were simply moderated discussion forums, however, in late 1983, mod.ber was created, named after and managed by Brian E. Redman; he, and a few associates regularly posted summaries of interesting postings and threads taking place elsewhere on the net. Another moderated newsgroup, rec.humor.funny started on August 7, 1987. In the 1990s, Internet forum software, such as WebEx, created running conversations with "threads".

In the early 1990s, when Tim Berners-Lee coined the term "World Wide Web" and defined the first standards for HTML and URLs, the specifications included "USENET newsgroups for serial publishing and discussions." Berners-Lee also created what is considered by Encyclopedia Britannica to be "the first 'blog'" in 1992 to discuss the progress made on creating the World Wide Web and software used for it.

== 1994–2001 ==
The modern blog evolved from the online diary, where people would keep a running account of their personal lives. Most such writers called themselves diarists, journalists, or journalers. A few called themselves "escribitionists". The Open Pages webring included members of the online-journal community. Justin Hall, who began eleven years of personal blogging in 1994 while a student at Swarthmore College, is generally recognized as one of the earliest bloggers, as is Jerry Pournelle. Another early blog was Wearable Wireless Webcam, an online shared diary of a person's personal life combining text, video, and pictures transmitted live from a wearable computer and EyeTap device to a web site in 1994. This practice of semi-automated blogging with live video together with text was referred to as sousveillance, and such journals were also used as evidence in legal matters.

Other forms of journals kept online also existed. A notable example was game programmer John Carmack's widely read journal, published via the finger protocol. Some of the very earliest bloggers, like Steve Gibson of sCary's Quakeholio (now Shacknews) and Stephen Heaslip of Blue's News (still running since 1995 with online archives back to July 1996), evolved from the Quake scene and Carmack's .plan updates. Steve Gibson was hired to blog full-time by Ritual Entertainment on February 8, 1997, possibly making him the first hired blogger. Another example of early blogging was the Poster Children online tour diary, started in 1995 by Rose Marshack.

The blog was independently invented by Ian Ring in 1997. His online journal program was never called a "blog", and had very limited functionality, consisting of blobs of text associated with dates in an Access database. Ring experimented again with data-powered journaling in 2002, to provide a CMS for the popular health and wellness site SeekWellness.com, publishing weekly posts by fitness columnist Donald Ardell. Ring likes to claim that he "invented the blog", which is technically true even though there were other projects that could make the claim with greater authority.

Another example of an early online entry into the evolution of blogging was created by Dave Winer. Winer is considered a pioneer of Web syndication techniques and has been considered one of the “fathers” of blogging. As the editor of Scripting News claims that his site “bootstrapped the blogging revolution and that it is the longest running Web Log in the internet.” Winer did not use the term "blog" and has never claimed the term. However he has gone on record as saying that “The first blogs were inspired by this blog, in fact many of them, including Barger's Robot Wisdom, used my software.”

Websites, including both corporate sites and personal homepages, had and still often have "What's New" or "News" sections, often on the index page and sorted by date. One example of a news based "weblog" is the Drudge Report founded by the self-styled maverick reporter Matt Drudge, though apparently Drudge dislikes this classification. Two others—Institute for Public Accuracy and Arts & Letters Daily—began posting news releases featuring several news-pegged one-paragraph quotes several times a week beginning in 1998. One noteworthy early precursor to a blog was the tongue-in-cheek personal website that was frequently updated by Usenet legend Kibo.

Early weblogs were simply manually updated components of common websites. However, the evolution of tools to facilitate the production and maintenance of web articles posted in reverse chronological order made the publishing process feasible to a much larger, less technical, population. Ultimately, this resulted in the distinct class of online publishing that produces blogs we recognize today. For instance, the use of some sort of browser-based software is now a typical aspect of "blogging". Blogs can be hosted by dedicated blog hosting services, or they can be run using dedicated software such as WordPress, Movable Type, Blogger or LiveJournal, or on regular web hosting services.

The term "weblog" was coined by Jorn Barger on 17 December 1997— log in this case nods to a ship's log, a written record of a ship's navigation and speed read from rope knots off a special weighed tool called a chip log. The short form, "blog," was coined by Peter Merholz, who jokingly broke the word weblog into the phrase we blog in the sidebar of his blog Peterme.com in April or May 1999. Shortly thereafter, Evan Williams at Pyra Labs used "blog" as both a noun and verb ("to blog," meaning "to edit one's weblog or to post to one's weblog") and devised the term "blogger" in connection with Pyra Labs' Blogger product, leading to the popularization of the terms.

After a slow start, blogging rapidly gained in popularity. Blog usage spread during 1999 and the years following, being further popularized by the near-simultaneous arrival of the first hosted blog tools:

- Open Diary launched in October 1998, soon growing to thousands of online diaries. Open Diary innovated the reader comment, becoming the first blog community where readers could add comments to other writers' blog entries.
- SlashDot, a still-popular blog for tech "nerds," launched in September 1997.
- Brad Fitzpatrick, a well known blogger, started LiveJournal in March 1999.
- Andrew Smales created Pitas.com in July 1999 as an easier alternative to maintaining a "news page" on a website, followed by DiaryLand in September 1999, focusing more on a personal diary community.
- Drew Peloso and Steven Hatch launched Onclave in late 1999, a blogging and syndication platform scripted in Dave Winer's Frontier.
- In 2000, blogger Traciy Curry-Reyes started the blog Movies Based on True Stories Database. The site was the first to connect the real people with movies that were inspired by their cases. The information regarding her first blog in 1998 and based on the same subject has been lost. Traciy Curry-Reyes' 2000 blog was listed at (Geocities.org/traciy2000). That blog ended with the closing of GeoCities. From there, she started the same blog with Blogger in 2008.
- Evan Williams and Meg Hourihan (Pyra Labs) launched blogger.com in August 1999 (purchased by Google in February 2003)

Blogging combined the personal web page with tools to make linking to other pages easier — specifically permalinks, blogrolls and TrackBacks. This, together with weblog search engines enabled bloggers to track the threads that connected them to others with similar interests.

== 2001–2004 ==
Several broadly popular American political blogs emerged in 2001: Ron Gunzburger's Politics1, Taegan Goddard's Political Wire, Glenn Reynolds' Instapundit, Charles Johnson's Little Green Footballs, and Jerome Armstrong's MyDD. Andrew Sullivan's AndrewSullivan.com — now entitled "The Daily Dish" — launched in October 2000 and gained readership during 2001, especially in the wake of the September 11 attacks. (Two earlier popular American political blogs were Bob Somerby's Daily Howler, launched in 1998, and Mickey Kaus' Kausfiles, launched in 1999).

By 2001, blogging was enough of a phenomenon that how-to manuals began to appear, primarily focusing on technique. The importance of the blogging community (and its relationship to larger society) increased rapidly. Established schools of journalism began researching blogging and noting the differences between journalism and blogging.

Also in 2002, many blogs focused on comments by U.S. Senate Majority Leader Trent Lott. Senator Lott, at a party honoring U.S. Senator Strom Thurmond, praised Senator Thurmond by suggesting that the United States would have been better off had Thurmond been elected president. Lott's critics saw these comments as a tacit approval of racial segregation, a policy advocated by Thurmond's 1948 presidential campaign. This view was reinforced by documents and recorded interviews dug up by bloggers. (See Josh Marshall's Talking Points Memo.) Though Lott's comments were made at a public event attended by the media, no major media organizations reported on his controversial comments until after blogs broke the story. Blogging helped to create a political crisis that forced Lott to step down as majority leader.

After 2002, blogs gained increasing notice and coverage for their role in breaking, shaping, and spinning news stories. The Iraq war saw bloggers taking measured and passionate points of view that go beyond the traditional left-right divide of the political spectrum.

Blogging was established by politicians and political candidates to express opinions on war and other issues and cemented blogs' role as a news source. (See Howard Dean and Wesley Clark.) Meanwhile, an increasing number of experts blogged, making blogs a source of in-depth analysis. (See Daniel Drezner and J. Bradford DeLong.)

Blogging was used to draw attention to obscure news sources. For example, bloggers posted links to traffic cameras in Madrid as a huge anti-terrorism demonstration filled the streets in the wake of the March 11 attacks.

Bloggers began to provide nearly-instant commentary on televised events, creating a secondary meaning of the word "blogging": to simultaneously transcribe and editorialize speeches and events shown on television. (For example, "I am blogging Rice's testimony" means "I am posting my reactions to Condoleezza Rice's testimony into my blog as I watch her on television.") Real-time commentary was sometimes referred to as "liveblogging."

== 2004–2013 ==
In 2004, the role of blogs became increasingly mainstream, as political consultants, news services and candidates began using them as tools for outreach and opinion forming. Even politicians not actively campaigning, such as the UK's Labour Party's MP Tom Watson, began to blog to bond with constituents.

Minnesota Public Radio broadcast a program by Christopher Lydon and Matt Stoller called "The blogging of the President," which covered a transformation in politics that blogging seemed to presage. The Columbia Journalism Review began regular coverage of blogs and blogging. Anthologies of blog pieces reached print, and blogging personalities began appearing on radio and television. In the summer of 2004, both United States Democratic and Republican Parties' conventions credentialed bloggers, and blogs became a standard part of the publicity arsenal. Mainstream television programs, such as Chris Matthews' Hardball, formed their own blogs. Merriam-Webster's Dictionary declared "blog" as the word of the year in 2004.

Blogs were among the driving forces behind the "Rathergate" scandal, to wit: (television journalist) Dan Rather presented documents (on the CBS show 60 Minutes) that conflicted with accepted accounts of President Bush's military service record. Bloggers declared the documents to be forgeries and presented evidence and arguments in support of that view, and CBS apologized for what it said were inadequate reporting techniques (see Little Green Footballs). Many bloggers view this scandal as the advent of blogs' acceptance by the mass media, both as a news source and opinion and as means of applying political pressure.

Some bloggers have moved over to other media. The following bloggers (and others) have appeared on radio and television: Duncan Black (known widely by his pseudonym, Atrios), Glenn Reynolds (Instapundit), Markos Moulitsas Zúniga (Daily Kos), Alex Steffen (Worldchanging) and Ana Marie Cox (Wonkette). In counterpoint, Hugh Hewitt exemplifies a mass media personality who has moved in the other direction, adding to his reach in "old media" by being an influential blogger. Music blog publisher Jeff Davidson, Earvolution.com, now produces Sun Studio Sessions airing on PBS stations across the U.S.

Some blogs were an important news source during the December 2004 Tsunami such as Médecins Sans Frontières, which used SMS text messaging to report from affected areas in Sri Lanka and Southern India. Similarly, during Hurricane Katrina in August 2005 and the aftermath a few blogs which were located in New Orleans, including the Interdictor and Gulfsails were able to maintain power and an Internet connection and disseminate information that was not covered by the mainstream media.

In 2005, Global Voices Online, a site which "aggregates, curates, and amplifies the global conversation online – shining light on places and people other media often ignore" surfaced, bringing to light bloggers from around the world. Today, the site has a relationship with Reuters and is responsible for breaking many global news stories.

In the United Kingdom, The Guardian newspaper launched a redesign in September 2005, which included a daily digest of blogs on page 2. Also in June 2006, BBC News launched a weblog for its editors, following other news companies.

In January 2005, Fortune magazine listed eight bloggers that business people "could not ignore": Peter Rojas, Xeni Jardin, Ben Trott, Mena Trott, Jonathan Schwartz, Jason Goldman, Robert Scoble, and Jason Calacanis. In 2007, Tim O'Reilly proposed a Blogger's Code of Conduct.

In 2011, Tom Knighton, owner of Knighton Media, Inc, announced that his company was purchasing The Albany Journal. Knighton Media was formed to managed Knighton's blog, Laws-n-Sausages, and this was the first known time that a blog had purchased a newspaper anywhere in the world.

In 2012, Evan Williams of Pyra Labs launched Medium, a publishing platform for amateur and professional writers. In some ways this was the beginning of the end of the blog as a social platform.

== 2014 and after ==
The evolution of social media and the speed of people reacting to posted content led to increasing declarations of the death of the blog, even as it was acknowledged that what came after would contain a lot of the same DNA as the blog . Even as the number of voices declaring blogs dead increased each year, others continued to see value, as for example in 2016 when the .blog domain name was launched. Depending on what one means by the word blog, blogging is alive and well - as of 2019, there are an estimated 500 million + blogs or blog-like sites in the world, including inactive websites. Not all platforms choose to share their data publicly, so the number of blogs on the web is likely much higher.
