= Effects of Hurricane Katrina in New Orleans =

As the center of Hurricane Katrina passed southeast of New Orleans on August 29, 2005, winds downtown were in the Category 1 range with frequent intense gusts. The storm surge caused approximately 23 breaches in the drainage canal and navigational canal levees and flood walls. As mandated in the Flood Control Act of 1965, responsibility for the design and construction of the city’s levees belongs to the United States Army Corps of Engineers and responsibility for their maintenance belongs to the Orleans Levee District. The failures of levees and flood walls during Katrina are considered by experts to be the worst engineering disaster in the history of the United States. By August 31, 2005, 80% of New Orleans was flooded, with some parts under 15 feet (4.6 m) of water. The famous French Quarter and Garden District escaped flooding because those areas are above sea level. The major breaches included the 17th Street Canal levee, the Industrial Canal levee, and the London Avenue Canal flood wall. These breaches caused the majority of the flooding, according to a June 2007 report by the American Society of Civil Engineers. The flood disaster halted oil production and refining which increased oil prices worldwide.

Between 80 and 90 percent of the residents of New Orleans were evacuated before the hurricane struck, testifying to some of the success of the evacuation measures. Despite this, not enough attention was paid to those without a car, credit cards, road experience or family living out of town. The Louisiana Superdome was used to house and support some of those who were unable to evacuate. Television shots frequently focused on the Superdome as a symbol of the flooding occurring in New Orleans.

The disaster had major implications for a large segment of the population, economy, and politics of the entire United States. It has prompted a Congressional review of the Army Corps of Engineers and the failure of portions of the federally built flood protection system which experts agree should have protected the city’s inhabitants from Katrina’s surge. Katrina has also stimulated significant research in the academic community into urban planning, real estate finance, and economic issues in the wake of a catastrophe.

== Background ==
The original residents of New Orleans settled on the high ground along the Mississippi River. Later developments eventually extended to nearby Lake Pontchartrain, built upon fill to bring them above the average lake level. Navigable commercial waterways extended from the lake to downtown. After 1940, the state decided to close those waterways following the completion of a new Industrial Canal for waterborne commerce, which opened in 1923. Closure of the waterways resulted in a drastic lowering of the water table by the city's drainage system, causing some areas to settle by up to 8 feet (2 m) due to the compacting and desiccation of the underlying organic soils.

Vertical cross-section of New Orleans, showing maximum levee height of 23 feet (7 m) at the Mississippi River on the left and 17.5 feet (5 m) at Lake Pontchartrain on the right

After the Great Mississippi Flood of 1927, United States Congress passed the Flood Control Act of 1928 which authorized the Army Corps of Engineers to design and construct flood control structures, along with levees, on the Mississippi River to protect populated areas from floods. It also affirmed the principle of local participation in federally funded projects but acknowledged that the $292 million already spent by local interests was sufficient to cover local participatory costs. It is instructive to note that, in addition, sovereign immunity was given to the Corps of Engineers under Section 3 of the Flood Control Act of 1928, which states “no liability of any kind would attach or rest upon the United States for any damage from or by floods or flood waters at any place, provided that if on any stretch of the banks of the Mississippi River it was impracticable to construct levees." 33 U.S.C. § 702c. Section 702c is sometimes referred as "Section 3 of the act," based on where it appears in the Public law. Heavy flooding caused by Hurricane Betsy in 1965 brought concerns regarding flooding from hurricanes to the forefront. In response, Congress passed the Flood Control Act of 1965 which mandated that henceforth, the Army Corps of Engineers shall be responsible for design and construction of flood protection in New Orleans. The local interests' role became operation and maintenance once the projects were complete.

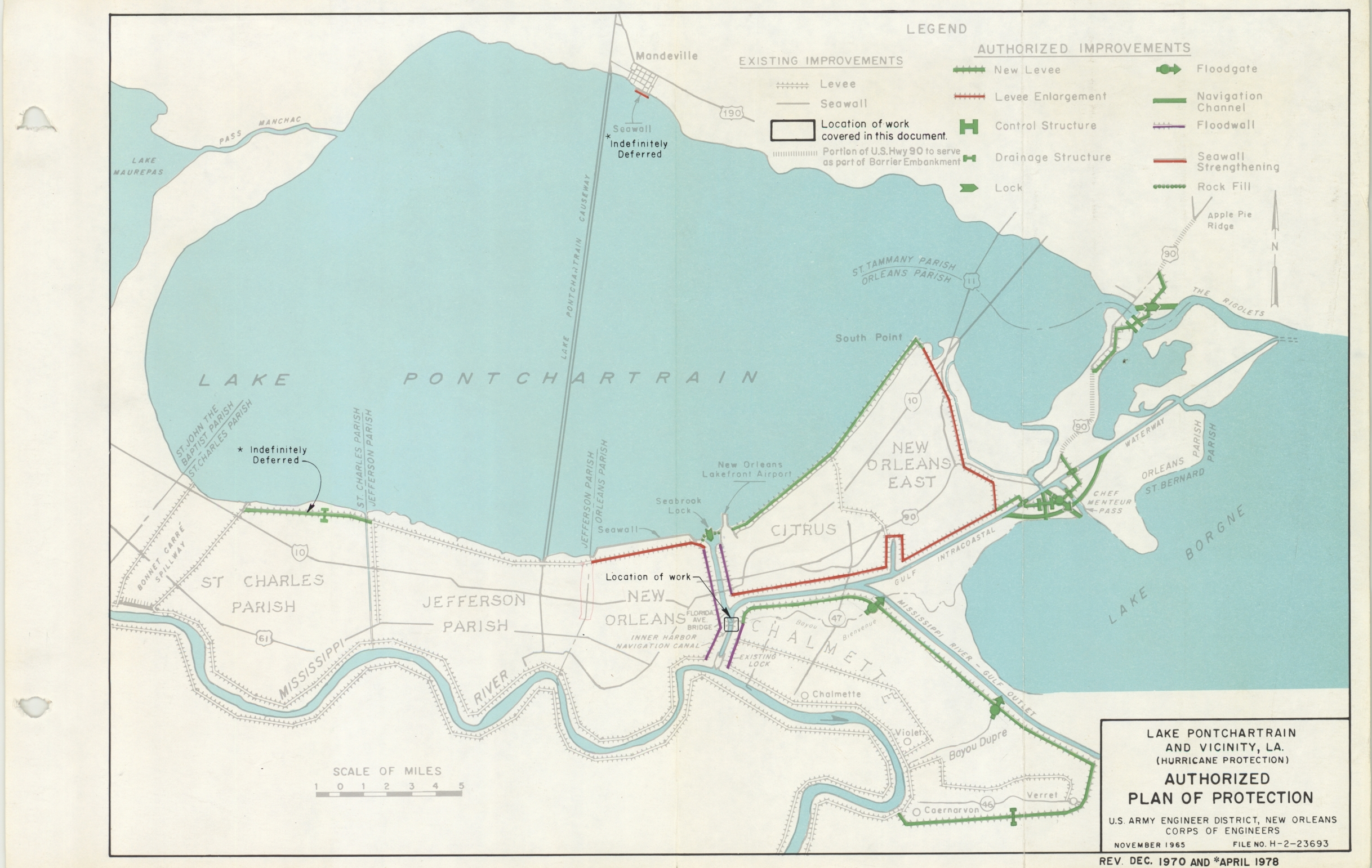
Authorized Plan of Protection for Lake Pontchartrain and Vicinity, Louisiana, November 1965. Map by U.S. Army Engineer District, New Orleans Corps of Engineers. Revised Dec 1970 and April 1978.

Also in 1965, Congress authorized a levee protection plan called the Lake Pontchartrain and Vicinity Hurricane Protection Project (LPVHPP). The project was initially estimated to take 13 years, but when Katrina struck in 2005, almost 40 years later, the project was only 60–90% complete with a revised projected completion date of 2015.

The levees were built on soil that vary in compression and consolidation rates. However, a 1999–2001 study, led by Richard Campanella of the Tulane School of Architecture, used LIDAR technology and found that 51% of the terrestrial surface of the contiguous urbanized portions of New Orleans lies at or above sea level, with the highest neighborhoods at 10–12 feet (3.0–3.7 m) above mean sea level. Forty-nine percent lies below sea level, in places to equivalent depths.

== Pre-Katrina preparations ==
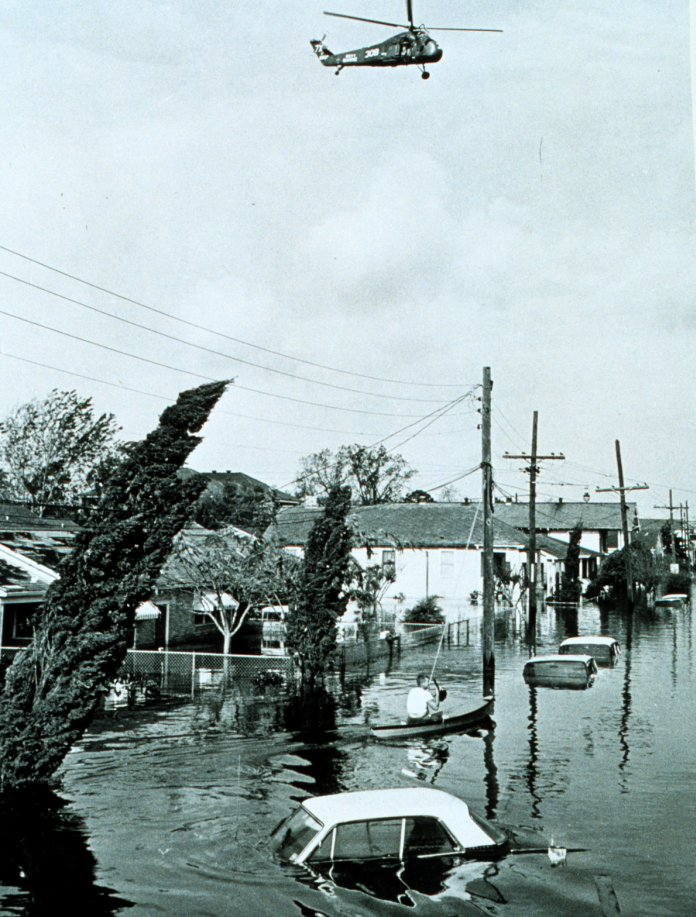
Flooding in the Lower Ninth Ward of New Orleans after Hurricane Betsy in 1965

President George W. Bush declared a state of emergency in selected regions of Louisiana, Alabama, and Mississippi on August 27. On Sunday August 28, Governor Kathleen Blanco requested that the President declare an "expedited major disaster for the State of Louisiana" including all the southeastern parishes including the City of New Orleans. On Sunday, August 28, President Bush spoke with Governor Blanco to encourage her to order a mandatory evacuation of New Orleans.

On August 28, at 10:00 a.m. CDT––less than 24 hours before landfall in Louisiana––the National Weather Service (NWS) field office in Slidell issued a bulletin predicting catastrophic wind damage. Anticipated effects included: "at least half of all well constructed homes will have roof and wall failure", "the majority of industrial buildings will become non functional," "all wood-framed low rising apartment buildings will be destroyed," "high-rise office and apartment buildings will sway dangerously," and "all windows will be blown out." Lack of clean water was predicted to “make human suffering incredible by modern standards.” It was forecast that the storm surge in Lake Pontchartrain would reach 14–18 feet (4.3–5.5 m), with waves reaching 7 feet (2.1 m) above the storm surge.

=== Evacuation order ===
On the night of Saturday, August 27, Max Mayfield, director of the National Hurricane Center, called the governors of Alabama, Louisiana, and Mississippi to warn them of the severity of the coming storm. He issued a special warning to Mayor Ray Nagin, telling him that some levees in the greater New Orleans area could be overtopped. Later, Mayfield would tell Brian Williams with NBC Nightly News that he went to bed that night believing he had done what he could. The following day, he made a video call to U.S. President George W. Bush at his farm in Crawford, Texas about the intensity of the storm.

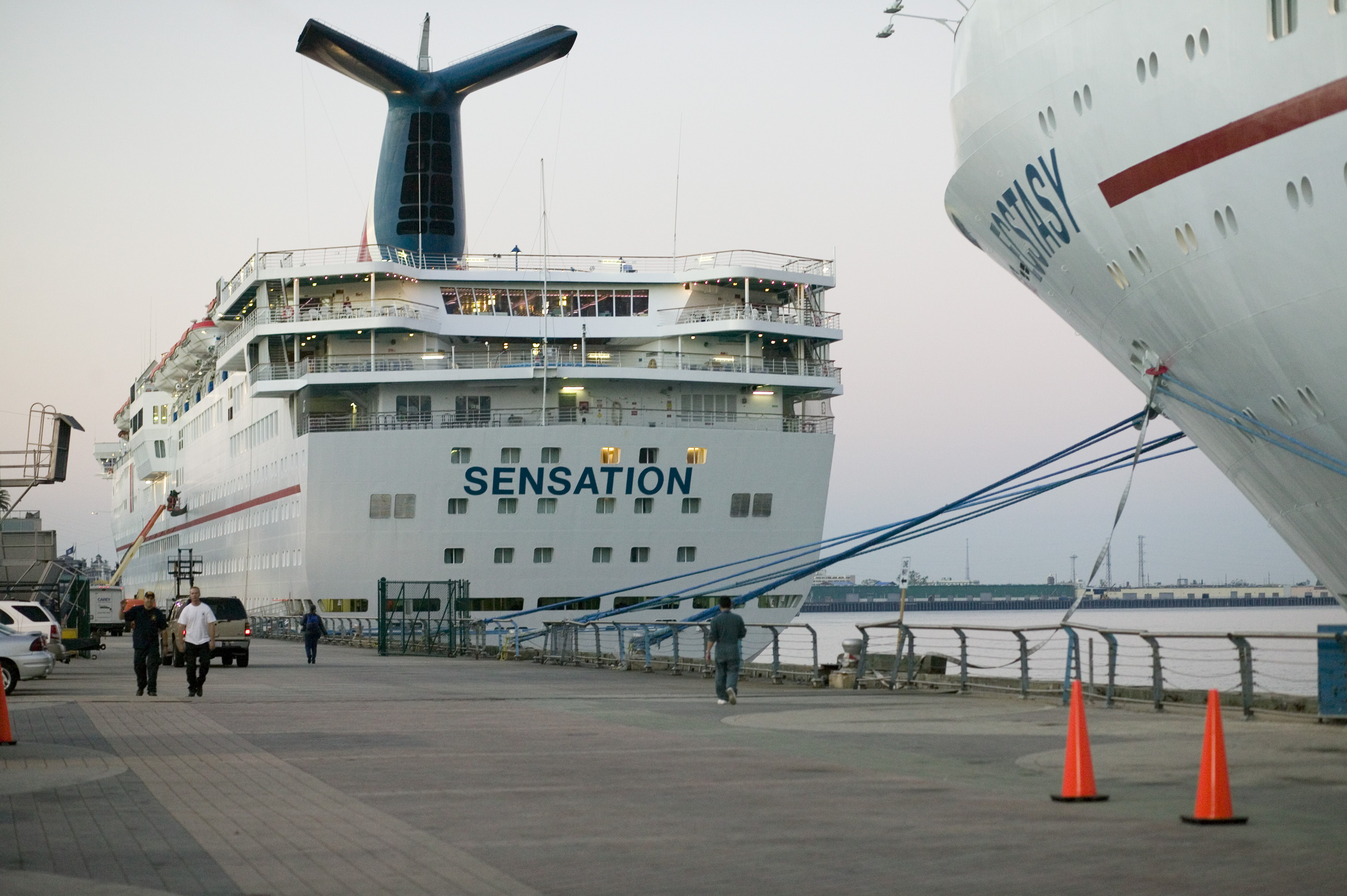
Carnival Cruise Ships Ecstasy and Sensation docked at the Port of New Orleans while used as housing for victims

Many New Orleans residents took precautions to secure their homes and prepare for possible evacuation on August 26 and 27. On August 27 the state of Louisiana was declared an emergency area by the Federal Government, and by mid-morning of that day, many local gas stations which were not yet out of gas had long lines. Nagin first called for a voluntary evacuation of the city at 5:00 p.m. on August 27 and subsequently ordered a citywide mandatory evacuation at 9:30 a.m. on August 28, the first such order in the city’s history. In a live news conference, Mayor Nagin predicted that “the storm surge most likely will topple our levee system”, and warned that oil production in the Gulf of Mexico would be shut down.

Although Mayor Ray Nagin ordered a mandatory evacuation of the city, many people refused to leave or were unable to do so. In Plaquemines Parish, an official described those staying behind as “gambling with their own lives.” Reasons were numerous, including a belief that their homes or the buildings in which they planned to stay offered sufficient protection, lack of financial resources or access to transportation, or a feeling of obligation to protect their property. These reasons were complicated by the fact that an evacuation the previous year for Hurricane Ivan had resulted in gridlocked traffic for six to ten hours. The fact that Katrina occurred at the end of the month before pay checks were in the hands of many was also significant. A “refuge of last resort” was designated at the Louisiana Superdome. Beginning at noon on August 28 and running for several hours, city buses were redeployed to shuttle local residents from 12 pickup points throughout the city to the “shelters of last resort.”

By the time Hurricane Katrina came ashore early the next morning, Mayor Nagin estimated that approximately one million people had fled the city and its surrounding suburbs. NOAA's official Katrina Service Assessment (2006) states that approximately 80% of New Orleans residents evacuated before Katrina. Using the city's approximately 485,000 residents, that implies roughly 97,000 remained. By the evening of August 28, about 20,000 people were sheltered at the Louisiana Superdome, along with 300 National Guard troops. The Superdome had been used as a shelter in the past, such as during 1998’s Hurricane Georges, because it was estimated to be able to withstand winds of up to 200 miles per hour (320 km/h) and water levels of 35 feet (11 m). While supplies of MREs (Meals ready to eat) and bottled water were available at the Superdome, Nagin told survivors to bring blankets and enough food for several days, warning that it would not be a comfortable place.

== Direct effects ==
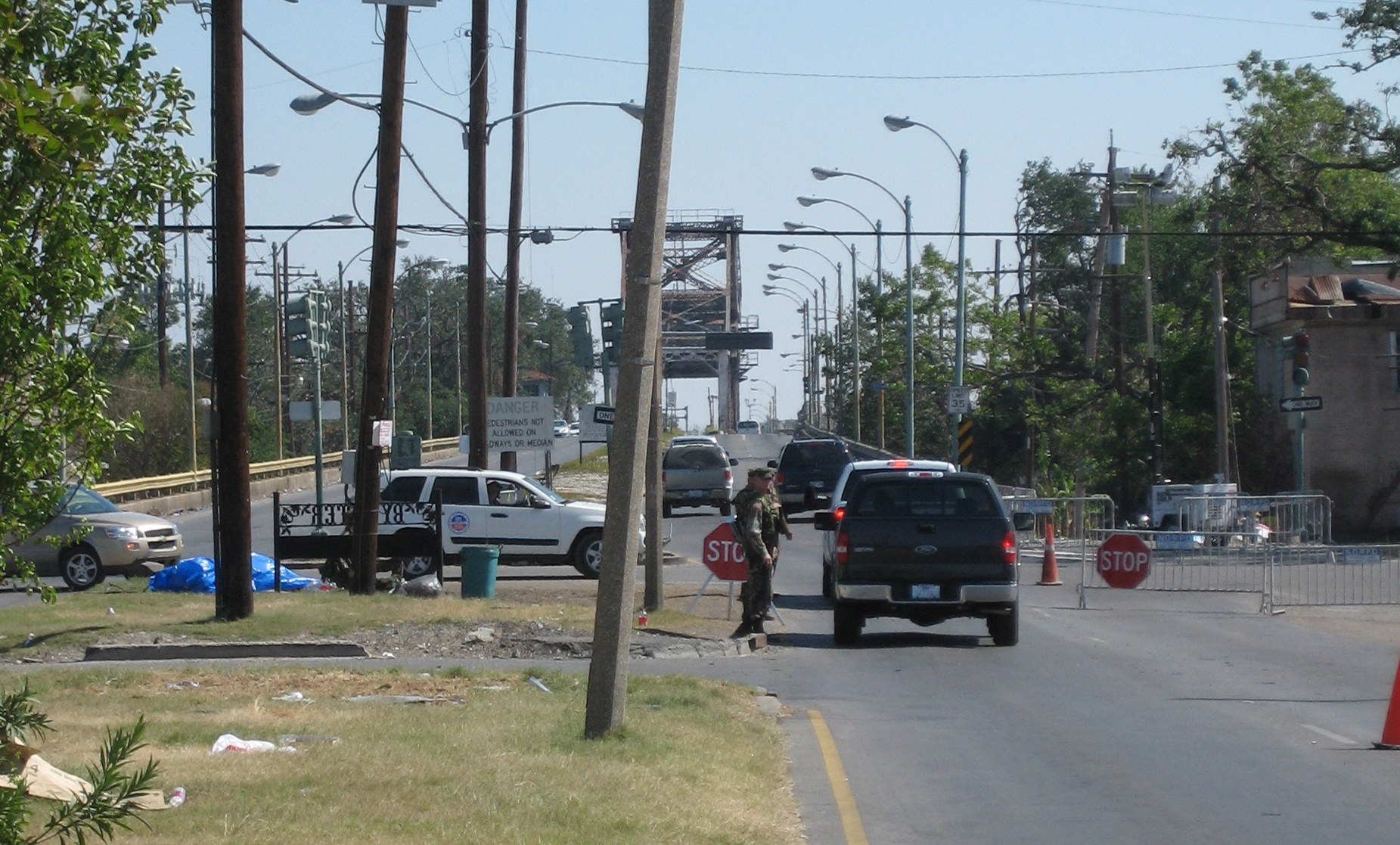
Checkpoint in the Ninth Ward at the Industrial Canal in October 2005. Residents were allowed in to examine and salvage from their property during daylight.

Hurricane Katrina made its second and third landfalls in the Gulf Coast region on Monday, August 29, 2005, as a Category 3 hurricane. Later that day, area affiliates of local television station WDSU reported New Orleans was experiencing widespread flooding due to breaches of several Army Corps-built levees, was without power, and experienced several instances of catastrophic damage in residential and business areas. Entire neighborhoods on the south shore of Lake Pontchartrain were flooded.

The extensive flooding stranded many residents who were forced to stay in place long after Hurricane Katrina had passed. Those stranded survivors dotted the tops of houses citywide. Some were trapped inside attics and unable to escape. Many people chopped their way onto their roofs with hatchets and sledge hammers, which Mayor Nagin had urged residents to store in their attics in case of such events. Clean water was unavailable, and power outages lasted for weeks. Some experts said that it could take six months or longer to pump all the water out of the city.

By 11 p.m. August 29, Mayor Nagin described the loss of life as “significant” with reports of bodies floating on the water throughout the city, primarily in the eastern portions. Some hotels and hospitals reported diesel fuel shortages. The National Guard began setting up temporary morgues in select locations to accommodate the bodies.

=== Damage to communication infrastructure ===
Phone and cellular service were inoperable because of line damages, and with more than 1000 base station sites being impacted. Some base stations had their own back-up generators but the long duration of power outages exceeded their capabilities. Mobile-phone providers encouraged people to use text messages instead of voice calls because "text messages are sent in small 'packets' of data, using less bandwidth." The loss of communications infrastructure affected coordination of rescue efforts. In a number of cases, reporters were asked to brief public officials on the conditions in areas where information was not reaching them any other way. Eight days after the storm, telephone company BellSouth Corp. estimated it would take four to six months to restore service in New Orleans.

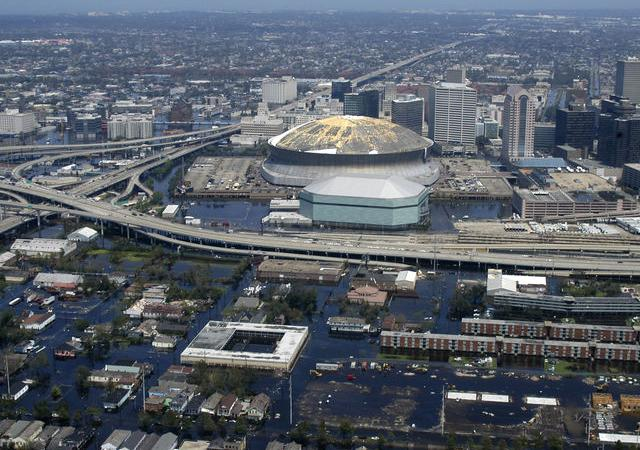
An aerial view of the flooding in part of the Central Business District. The Superdome is at the center where many people stayed through the course of Katrina.

All local television stations were disrupted. Local television stations and newspapers moved quickly to sister locations in nearby cities. New Orleans CBS-affiliate WWL-TV was the only local station to remain on the air during and after the storm, broadcasting from Baton Rouge. Broadcasting and publishing on the Internet became an important means of distributing information to evacuees and the rest of the world, with news networks citing blogs like Interdictor and Gulfsails for reports of what was happening in the city. Amateur radio provided tactical and emergency communications and handled health-and-welfare enquiries. By September 4, a temporary communications hub was set up at the Hyatt Hotel in downtown New Orleans.

Starting two days after Katrina, the video footage out of New Orleans shown on national television was from a helicopter normally used for Hollywood movies. The Federal Aviation Administration directed a single pool helicopter to gather feeds to safeguard rescue aircraft in the area.

=== Damage to buildings and roads ===
Most of the city’s major roads were damaged. The only route out of the city was east to the West Bank of New Orleans on the Crescent City Connection bridge. The I-10 Twin Span Bridge traveling east towards Slidell suffered severe damage; 473 spans were separated from their supports and 64 spans dropped into the lake. The 24-mile (39 km) long Lake Pontchartrain Causeway escaped unscathed but was only carrying emergency traffic.

On August 29, at about 7:30 a.m. CDT, it was reported that most of the windows on the north side of the Hyatt Regency New Orleans had been blown out, and many other high rise buildings nearby also had extensive window damage. The Hyatt was the most severely damaged hotel in the city, with beds reported to be flying out of the windows. Insulation tubes were exposed as the hotel’s glass exterior was completely sheared off.

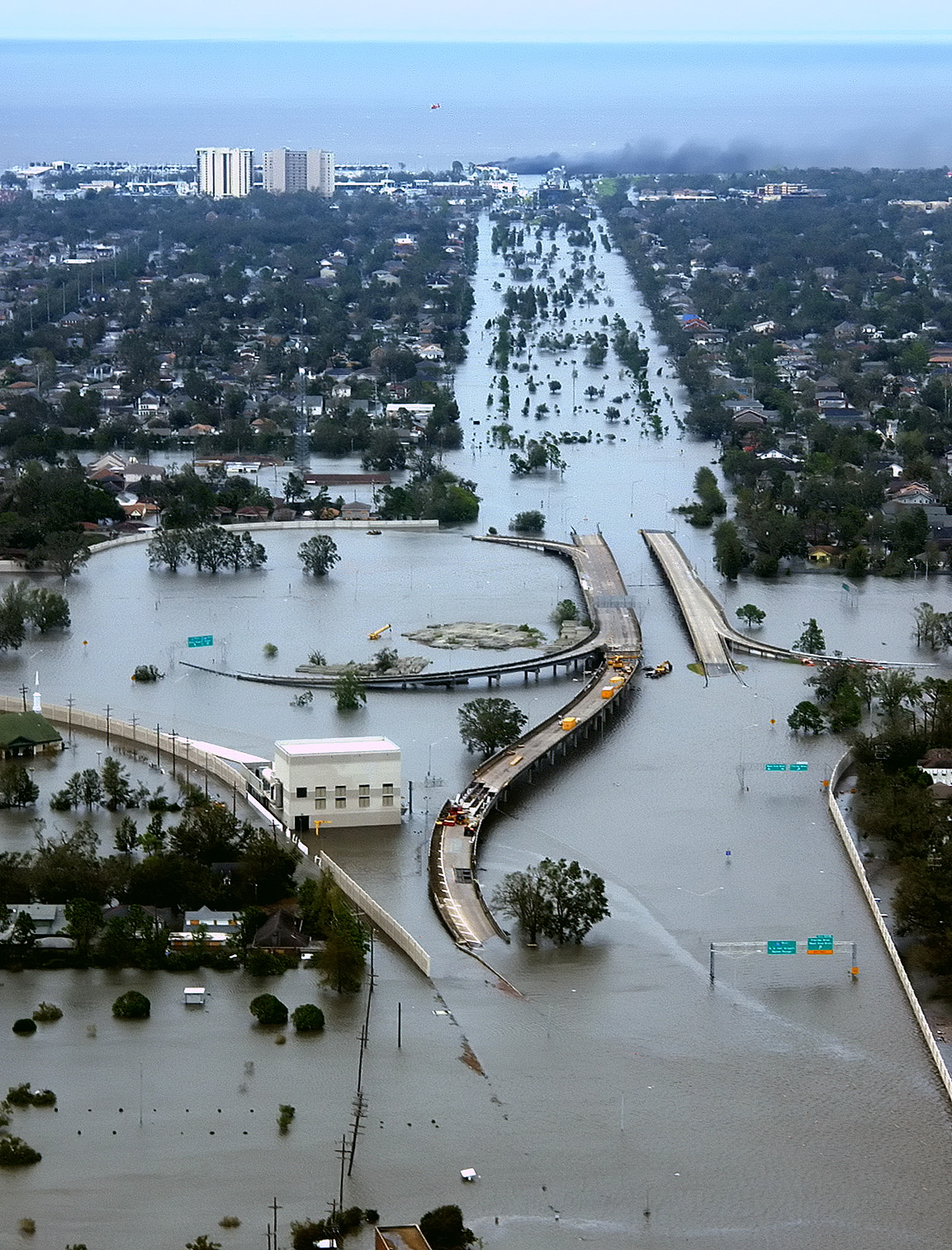
Flooded I-10/I-610 interchange and surrounding area of northwest New Orleans and Metairie, Louisiana

Louis Armstrong New Orleans International Airport was closed before the storm but reported no flooding in airplane movement areas or inside of the terminal itself. By August 30, it was reopened to humanitarian and rescue operations. Commercial cargo flights resumed on September 10, and commercial passenger service resumed on September 13.

The Superdome sustained significant damage, including two sections of the waterproof membrane on the roof that were peeled off by the wind. On August 30, Louisiana Governor Kathleen Blanco ordered the complete evacuation of the remaining people that sought shelter in the Superdome. They were then transported to the Astrodome in Houston, Texas.

Charity Hospital sustained significant damage as well. It had most of its windows blown out and suffered ceiling tile and light fixture damage from the strong winds caused by Katrina. Later that day, rising floodwaters began to fill up the building, which caused the main generators to fail, so the hospital staff decided to evacuate everyone to the auditorium. Conditions in the auditorium began to deteriorate, so on September 1, the first 100 medically ill patients were taken by helicopter to Baton Rouge. The remaining persons were evacuated at about 3:00 pm the next day.

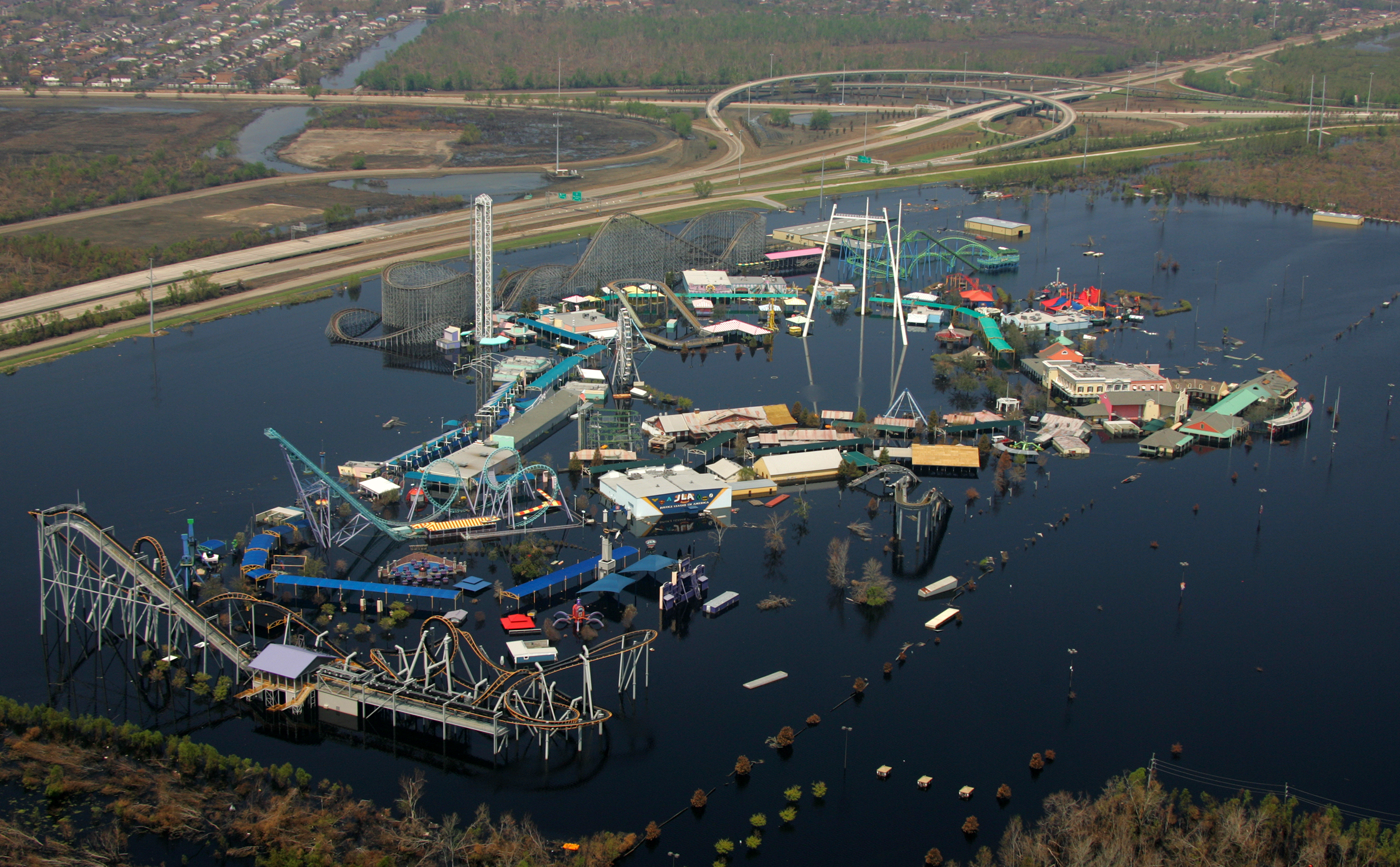
Six Flags New Orleans still flooded 2 weeks after the levee failures

Because of the extensive damage Katrina caused to Six Flags New Orleans, which included flooding and corroded roller-coaster tracks, the theme park eventually became abandoned and was not repaired because it would be too expensive and the park was not very profitable. Several reopening or reparation proposals have been planned, but none of them were successful in following through. Although the theme park remains standing as of 2023, reports suggest that it will be demolished in the following years. In August 2024, Bayou Phoenix announced that the park will be demolished beginning in September of 2024.

=== Levee failures in New Orleans ===
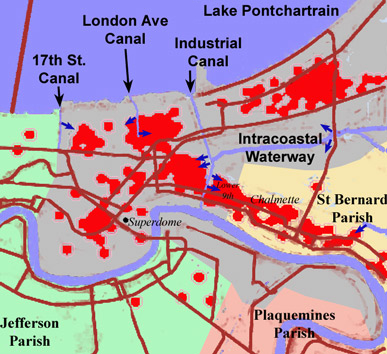
Sketch of New Orleans (shaded gray), indicating the locations of the principal breaches in the levees/floodwalls (dark blue arrows). Red dots show locations of deaths.

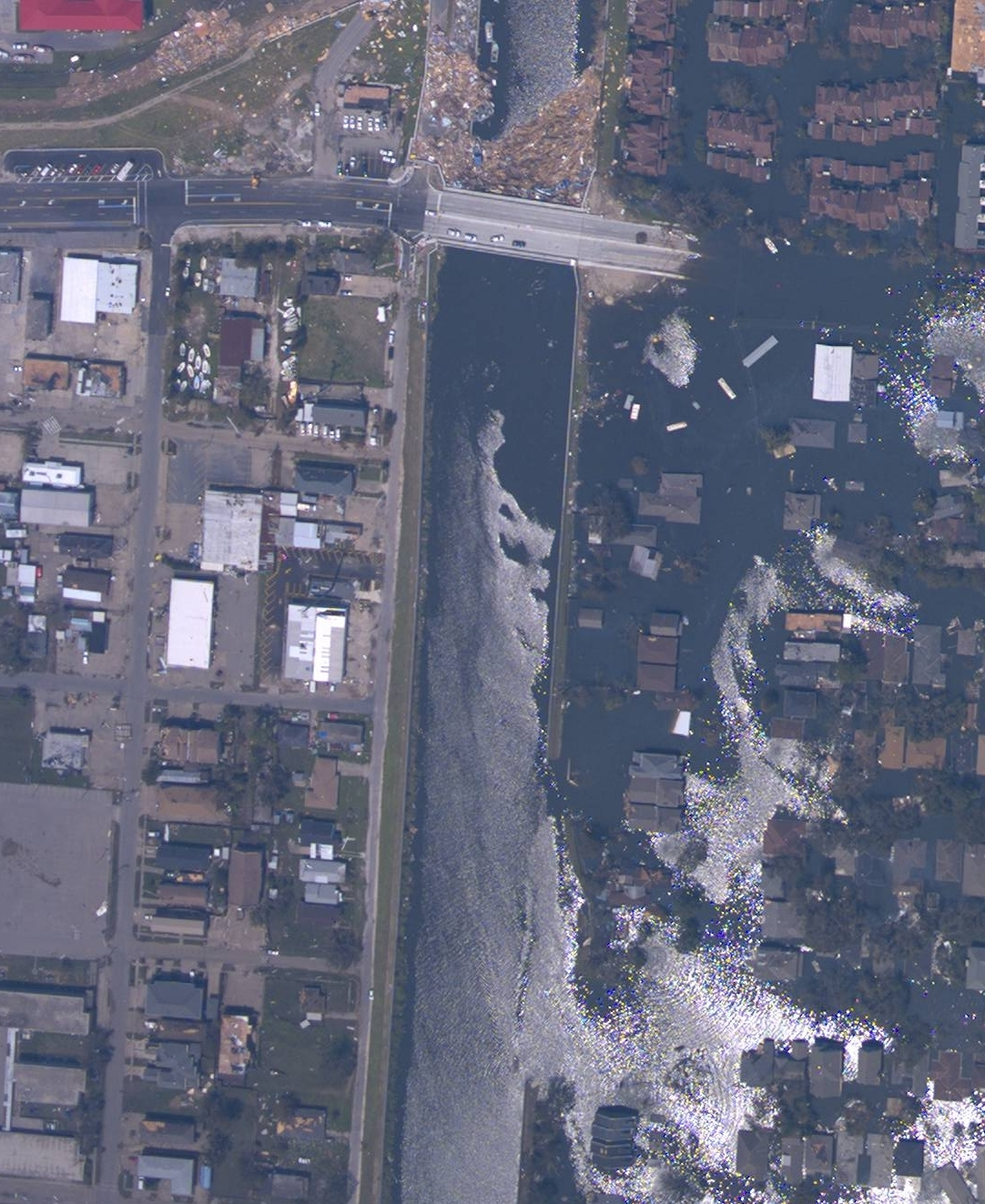
Breach in 17th Street Canal levee on August 31, showing the inundated Lakeview neighborhood on the right and the largely dry Metairie side on the left (NOAA)

On landfall day, about 5:00 am, a 30-foot section of floodwall, called a "monolith," on the east side of the Inner Harbor Navigation Canal (known locally as the Industrial Canal), breached and released flood water into the adjacent Lower Ninth Ward, a dense lower to middle-income neighborhood of primarily Black homeowners. By 6:30 a.m. CDT, levees along the Gulf Intracoastal Waterway on the south side of New Orleans East overtopped and breached. Surge from the multiple breaches flooded the primarily middle to upper-income Black region of homeowners and business.

On the west edge of New Orleans, between 6 and 7:00 am, a monolith on the east side of the London Avenue Canal structurally failed and allowed water over 10 feet deep into Fillmore Gardens, a mixed middle-income neighborhood. At about 6:30 a.m., several monoliths failed on the 17th Street Canal releasing into Lakeview, a mainly middle-income neighborhood of white homeowners. Local fire officials reported this breach. An estimated 66% to 75% of the city was now under water. The Duncan and Bonnabel Pumping Stations were also reported to have suffered roof damage, and were non-functional.

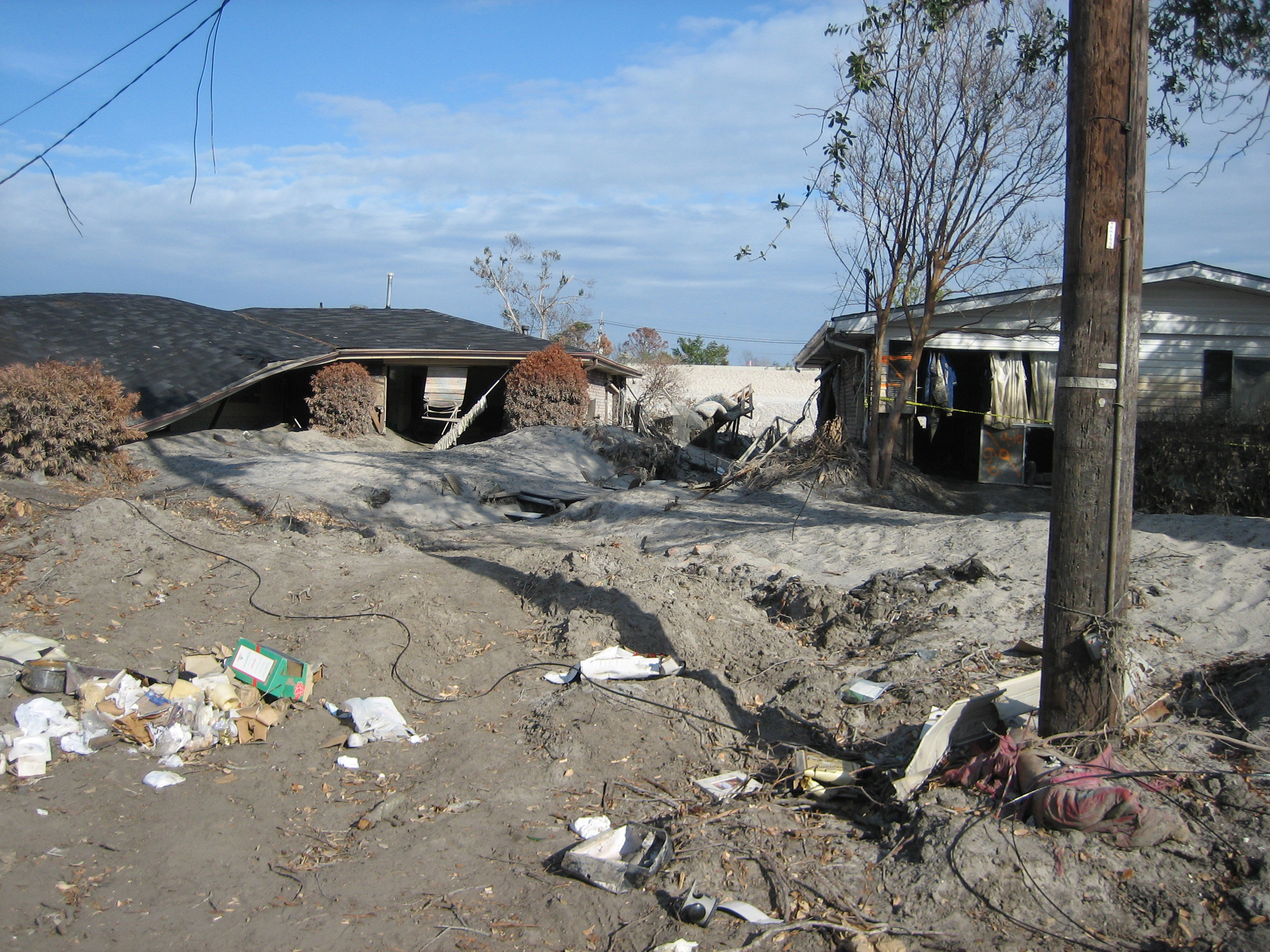
Severely damaged homes in piles of sand near the upper London Avenue Canal breach

At approximately 7:45 a.m. CDT, a much larger second hole opened up in the Industrial Canal just south of the initial breach. Floodwaters from the two breaches combined to submerge the entire historic Lower Ninth Ward in over 10 feet of water. Between 7 and 8:00 am, the west side of the London Avenue Canal breached, in addition to the east side, and flooded the adjacent mixed-race neighborhood of homeowners.

The Orleans Avenue Canal, engineered to the same standards as the 17th Street and London Avenue Canals and presumed to be put under similar stresses survived intact due, in part, to the presence of an unintended 100-foot-long ‘spillway,’ a section of legacy wall that was significantly lower than the adjacent floodwalls.

There were 28 reported failures in the first 24 hours and over 50 were reported in the ensuing days. The levees and flood walls were designed and built by the US Army Corps of Engineers. In a June 2006 report on the disaster, the Army Corps admitted that faulty design specifications, incomplete sections, and substandard construction of levee segments, contributed to the flooding damage in New Orleans. A report released by the American Society of Civil Engineers in June 2007 concluded that two-thirds of the flooding in New Orleans could have been avoided if the levees had held structurally. The same report also determined the flooding of New Orleans to be "the worst engineering catastrophe in US History."

In September 2022, the Associated Press issued a style guide change to Katrina stating that reporters when writing about the storm in New Orleans should note that "…levee failures played a major role in the devastation in New Orleans. In some stories, that can be as simple as including a phrase about Hurricane Katrina’s catastrophic levee failures and flooding…"

=== Loss of life ===
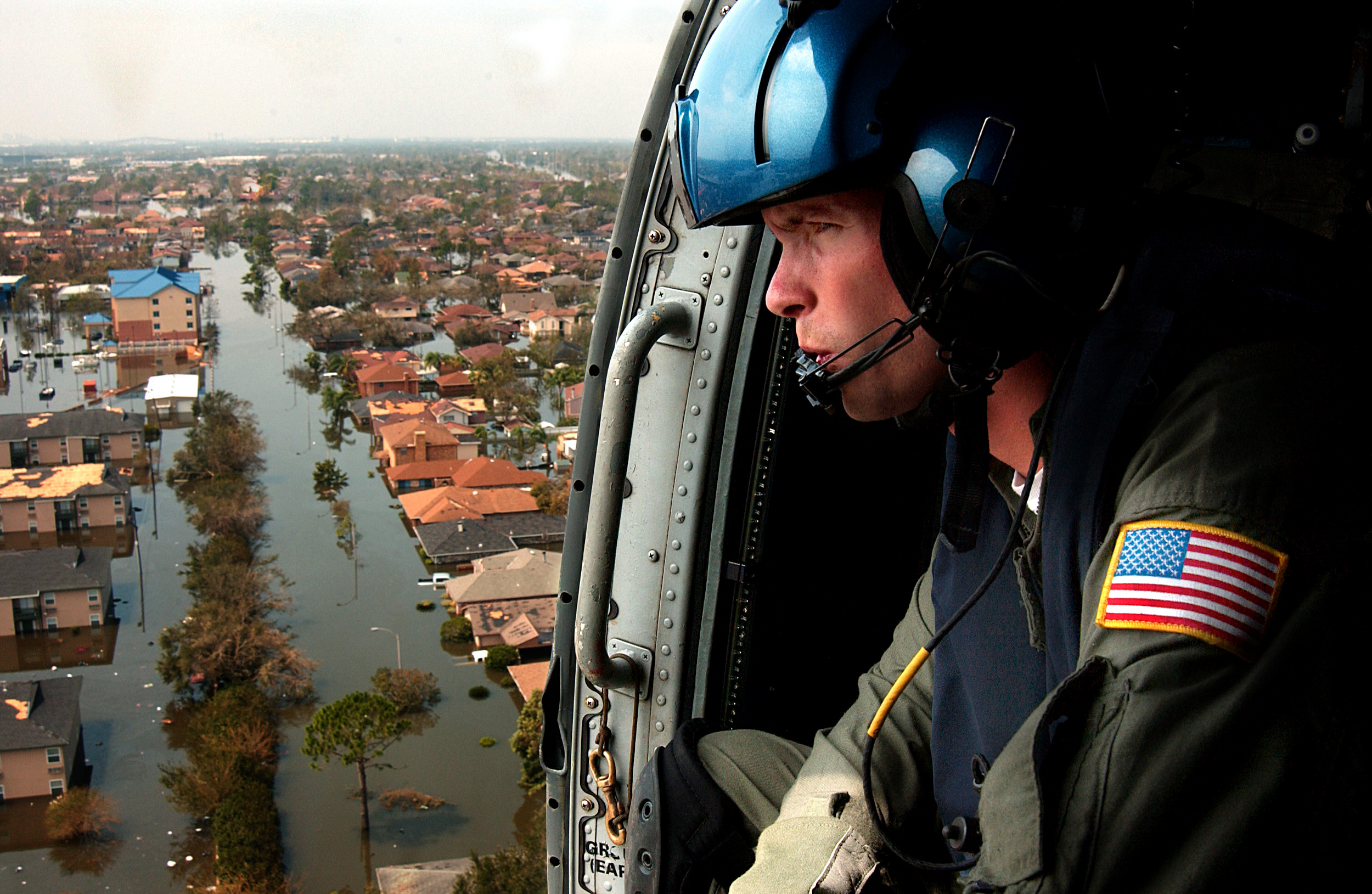
A U.S. Coast Guard aircrew searches for survivors in New Orleans during the aftermath of Hurricane Katrina.

Preliminary reports indicate that the official death toll, according to the Louisiana Department of Health, was 1,464 people. The first deaths were reported shortly before midnight on August 28, 2005, as three nursing home patients died during an evacuation to Baton Rouge. On September 4, Mayor Nagin speculated that the death toll could rise as high as ten thousand after the clean-up was completed. Some survivors and evacuees reported seeing bodies lying in city streets and floating in still-flooded sections, especially in the east of the city. The advanced state of decomposition of many corpses, some of which were left in the water or sun for days before being collected, hindered efforts by coroners to identify many of the dead.

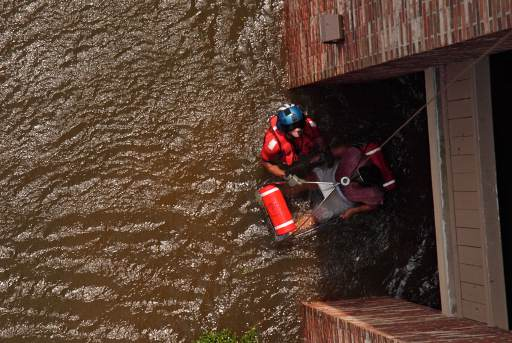
Successful rescue of a pregnant woman

There were six deaths confirmed at the Superdome. Four of these were from natural causes, one was the result of a drug overdose, and one was a suicide. At the Convention Center, four bodies were recovered. One of these four is believed to be the result of a homicide. Body collection throughout the city began on approximately September 9. Prior to that date, the locations of corpses were recorded, but most were not retrieved.

Later studies determined that most of New Orleans's Katrina deaths were elderly persons living near levee breaches in the Lower Ninth Ward and Lakeview neighborhoods.

== Aftermath ==
=== Civil disturbances ===
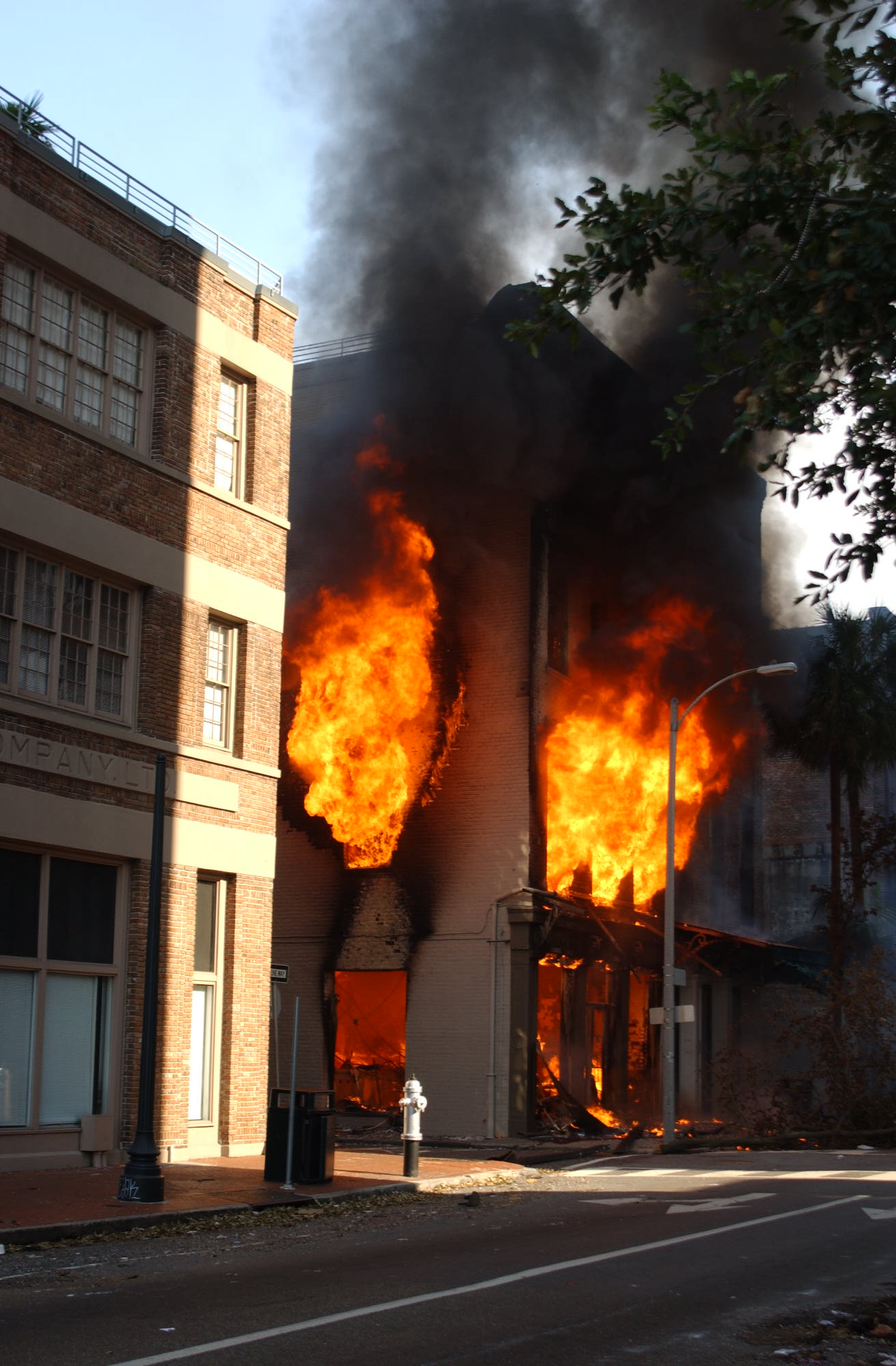
A fire raging in a downtown business at 329 Tchoupitoulas Street on the morning of September 2

The aftermath of Hurricane Katrina was characterized by extensive reporting of looting, violence, murder and rape. While some criminal acts did occur, such as the emptying of an entire Walmart, many reports were also exaggerated, inflated, or simply fabricated. Several news organizations went on to issue retractions.

In a press conference on September 1st, Louisiana Governor Kathleen Blanco warned looters that she was sending 300 Louisiana National guardsmen, stating,

These troops are fresh back from Iraq. They are well-trained, experienced, battle-tested and under my orders to restore order in the streets. These are some of the 40,000 extra troops that I have demanded. They have M16s and they’re locked and loaded. When hoodlums victimize and inflict suffering on people at their wit's end, they're taking away our limited resources, or whatever resources we have, to save babies, or save children and to save good people. I have one message for these hoodlums. These troops know how to shoot and kill, and they are more than willing to do so if necessary, and I expect they will.

This followed President George W. Bush's statement that looters should be treated with "zero tolerance."

There were reports of snipers taking potshots at rescue helicopters; these were false. Reports of gangs roving the city shooting police officers and survivors were also false, as only one policeman was shot in the aftermath of Katrina and no indictments were brought forward against the supposed gang members.

Many reported instances of “looting” were in fact stranded survivors scavenging necessary supplies such as food, water, clothing, and shelter. Some instances of looting were later found out to have been carried out by a small number of NOPD officers.

Civil disturbances in post-Hurricane Katrina were consistent with all existing research on disaster sociology, which concludes that “[post-disaster] widespread looting [is] a myth”, and were vastly overstated by the media, ultimately fueling a climate of suspicion and paranoia which greatly hampered rescue efforts and further worsened the conditions of the survivors.

Some initial reports of crime and mass chaos, particularly in stories about the Superdome, were later found to be exaggerated or rumors. In the Superdome, for example, the New Orleans sex crimes unit investigated every report of rape or atrocity and found only two verifiable incidents, both of sexual assault. On September 1, Chief Eddie Compass reported to news outlets, "We have individuals who are getting raped; we have individuals who are getting beaten." September 6, while heading into the city of New Orleans, Oprah Winfrey was stopped by Chief Eddie Compass. He reported, "We had little babies in there, little babies getting raped." Later Oprah Winfrey met with Mayor Ray Nagin, who reported, "They have people standing out there, have been in that frickin’ Superdome for five days watching dead bodies, watching hooligans killing people, raping people." Rumors of children with slit throats, women being gang raped, and hundreds of bodies piling within the Superdome continued to spread. These reports and others alike in New Orleans further escalated the rumors of rampant rape and crime. The department head told reporters, “I think it was an urban myth. Any time you put 25,000 people under one roof, with no running water, no electricity and no information, stories get told.” Based on these reports, government officials expected hundreds of dead to be found in the Superdome, but instead found only six dead: four natural deaths, one drug overdose, and one suicide. In a case of reported sniper fire, the “sniper” turned out to be the relief valve of a gas tank popping every few minutes.

In February 2019, Roland J. Bourgeois Jr., 55, of Algiers Point was sentenced to 10 years in prison for shooting three black men who were trying to flee the area in the aftermath of Katrina. He died shortly after.

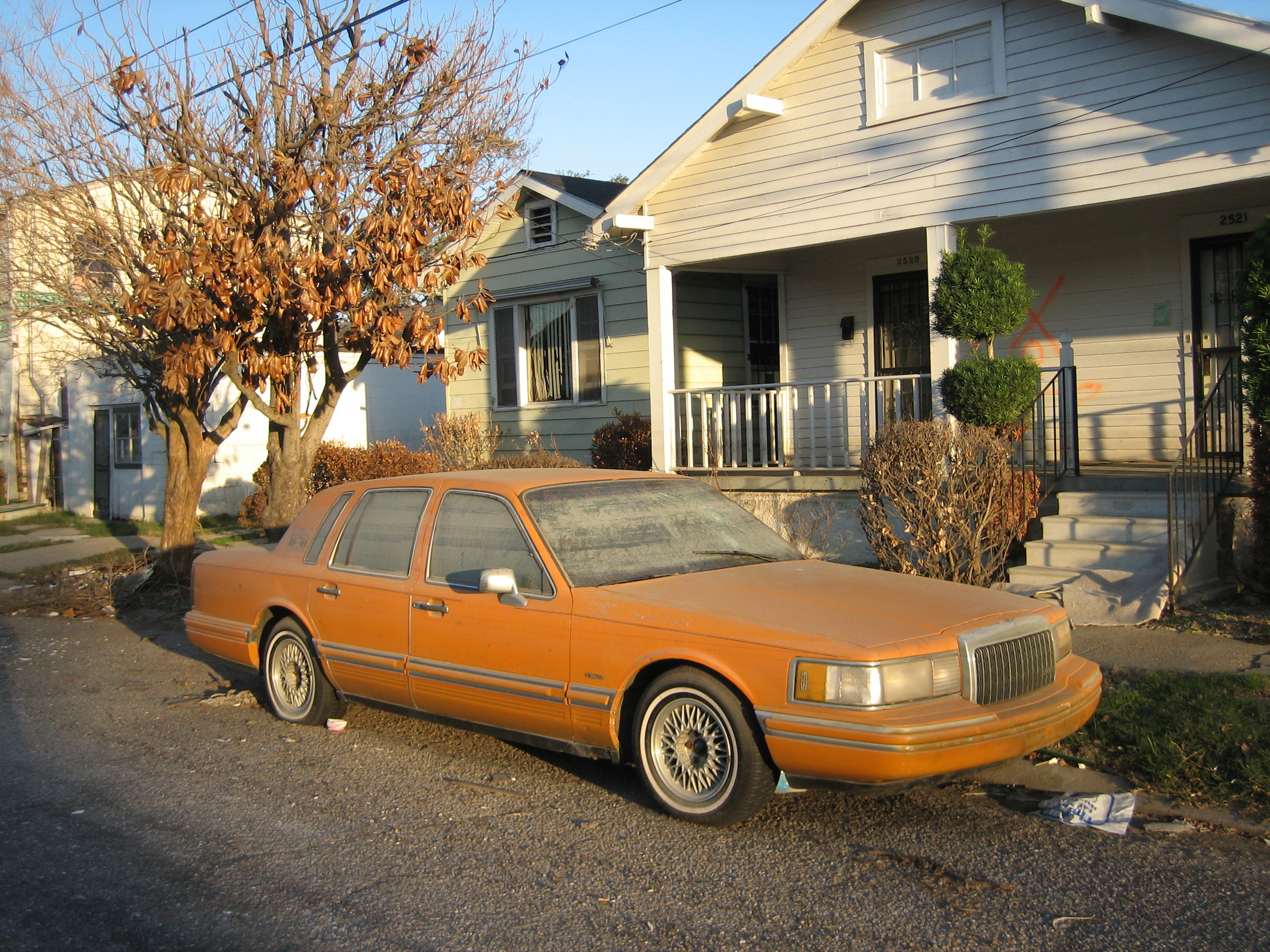
A Lincoln Town Car disabled by the flooding from Katrina

Additional acts of unrest occurred following the storm, particularly with the New Orleans Police Department. In the aftermath, a tourist asked a police officer for assistance, and got the response, “Go to hell, it's every man for himself.” Also, one-third of New Orleans police officers deserted the city in the days before the storm, many of them escaping in their department-owned patrol cars. This added to the chaos by stretching law enforcement thin. Several NOPD officers were arrested weeks after Katrina for suspicion of vehicle theft.

=== Gretna controversy ===
The City of Gretna on the West Bank of the Mississippi River received considerable press coverage when, in the aftermath of Hurricane Katrina (late August 2005), displaced and dehydrated survivors who attempted to escape from New Orleans by walking over the Crescent City Connection bridge over the Mississippi River were turned back at gunpoint by City of Gretna Police, along with Crescent City Connection Police and Jefferson Parish Sheriff’s deputies, who set up a roadblock on the bridge in the days following the hurricane.

=== Re-establishing governance ===
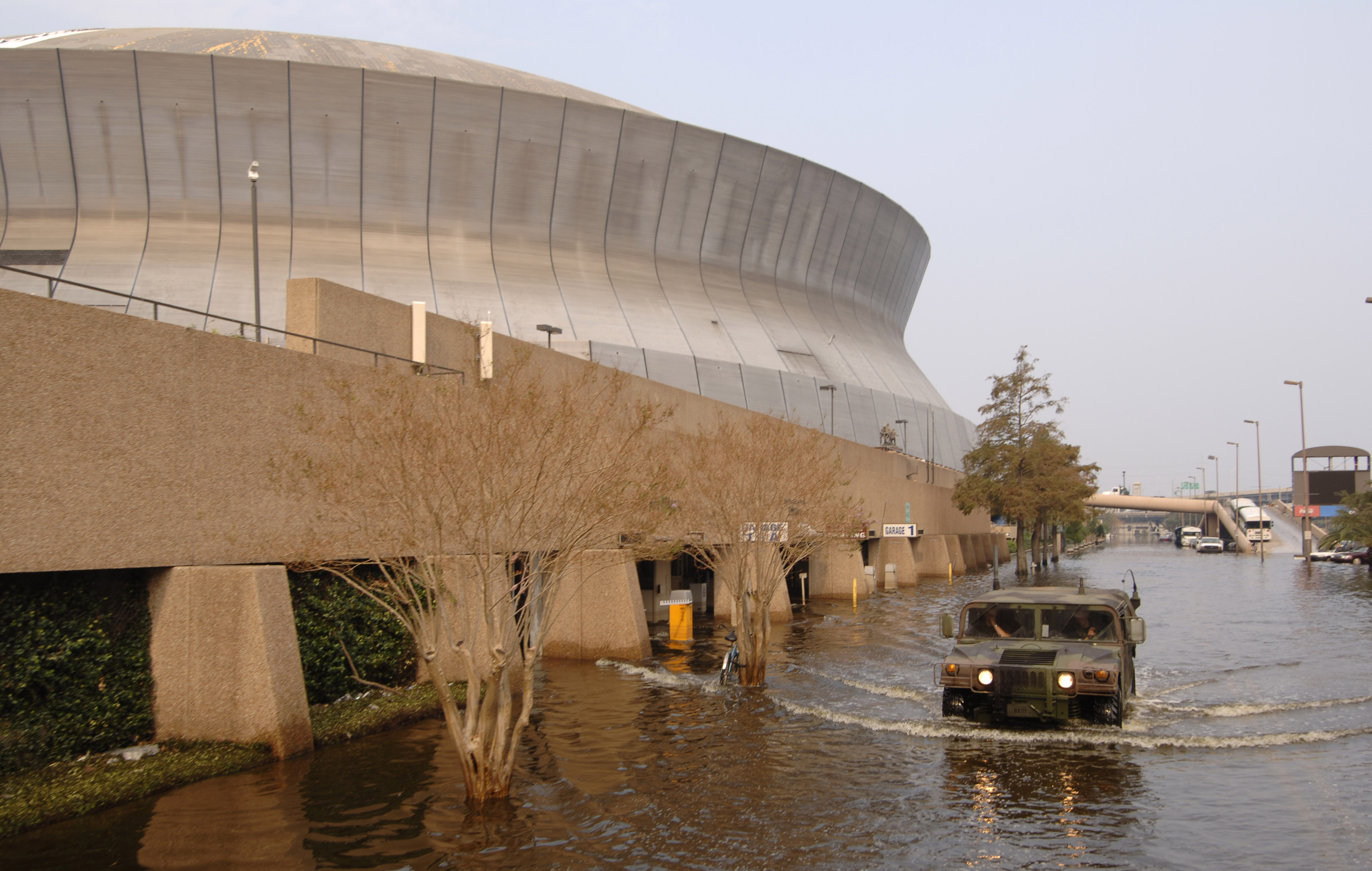
A United States National Guard humvee patrols Poydras Street outside of the Superdome.

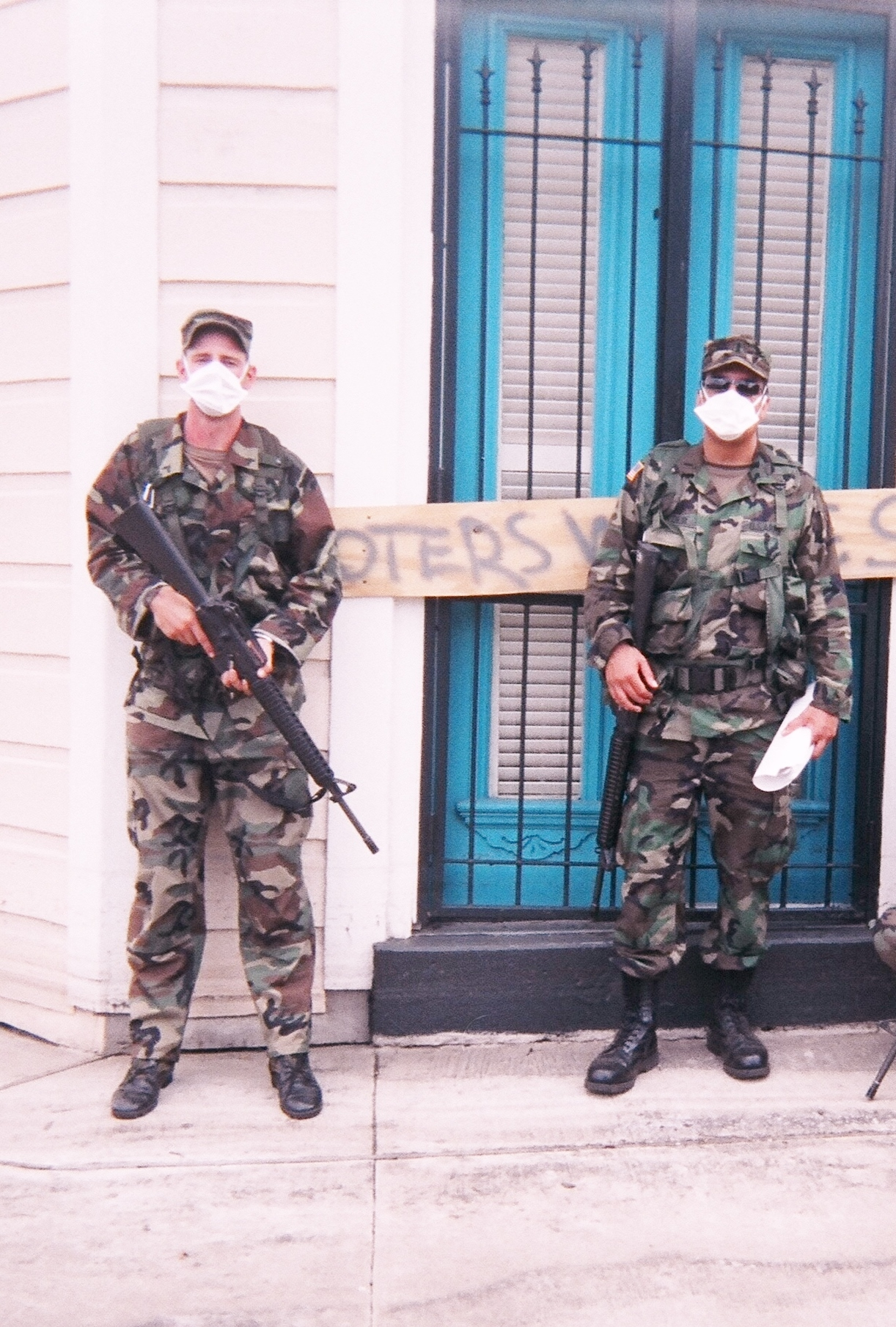
U.S. Army Infantry on patrol in New Orleans in an area previously underwater, September 2005

By September 1, 6,500 National Guard troops had arrived in New Orleans, and on September 2 Blanco requested a total of 40,000 for assistance in evacuation and security efforts in Louisiana. In addition, the Louisiana State Guard and state defense forces from several states were activated to aid the National Guard in sheltering the large number of refugees leaving Louisiana and assist in other disaster recovery operations. On September 30, the New Orleans Police Department confirmed that 12 police officers were participating in looting and property theft.

Some concern over the availability and readiness of the Louisiana National Guard to help stabilize the security situation was raised. Guardsman Lieutenant Colonel Pete had commented that “dozens of high water vehicles, humvees, refuelers, and generators were abroad.” At the time of the hurricane, approximately 3,000 members of the Guard were serving a tour of duty in Iraq. With total personnel strength of 11,000, this meant that 27% of the Louisiana National Guard was abroad. However, both the White House and the Pentagon argued that the depletion of personnel and equipment did not impact the ability of the Guard to perform its mission—rather, impassable roads and flooded areas were the major factors impeding the Guardsmen from securing the situation in New Orleans.

Before Hurricane Katrina, the murder rate in New Orleans was ten times higher than the U.S. average. After the situation in New Orleans was brought under control, criminal activity in New Orleans dropped significantly.

In response to the increase in criminal activity in New Orleans, makeshift prisons were constructed to house prisoners for short periods of time. Camp Greyhound was a temporary prison that housed more than 200 suspected looters in New Orleans until they could be transferred to other institutions. With room for 700 prisoners, the facility was guarded by officers from one of the United States' toughest prisons, the Louisiana State Penitentiary at Angola. The station’s bus terminals were converted into chain-link prison cells that could hold up to fifteen prisoners each. These prisoners were kept in conditions that included a portable toilet and military issued meals, but excluded a mattress or cot.

Law enforcement constructed the necessary offices of a police station in the general areas of the bus station, which included the offices of the District Attorney and the Justice Department. Camp Greyhound did have several issues with police records due to flooding, and prisoners who had committed minor infractions were kept in the same areas as those with more serious allegations. The facility was run on backup generators and outdated fingerprinting methods were used, which added to the confusion of the facility.

=== The Superdome ===
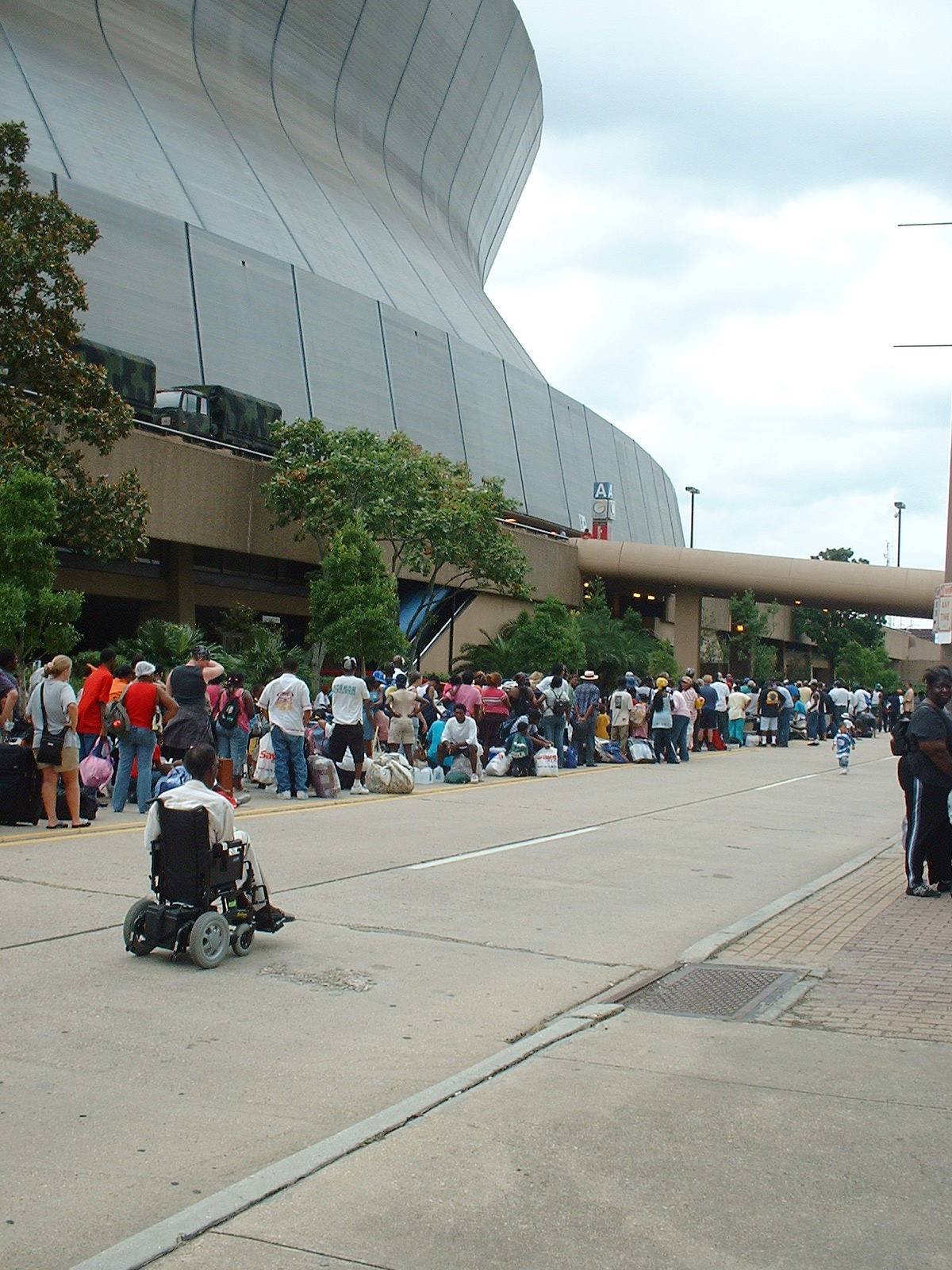
Displaced people bringing their belongings and lining up to get into the Superdome

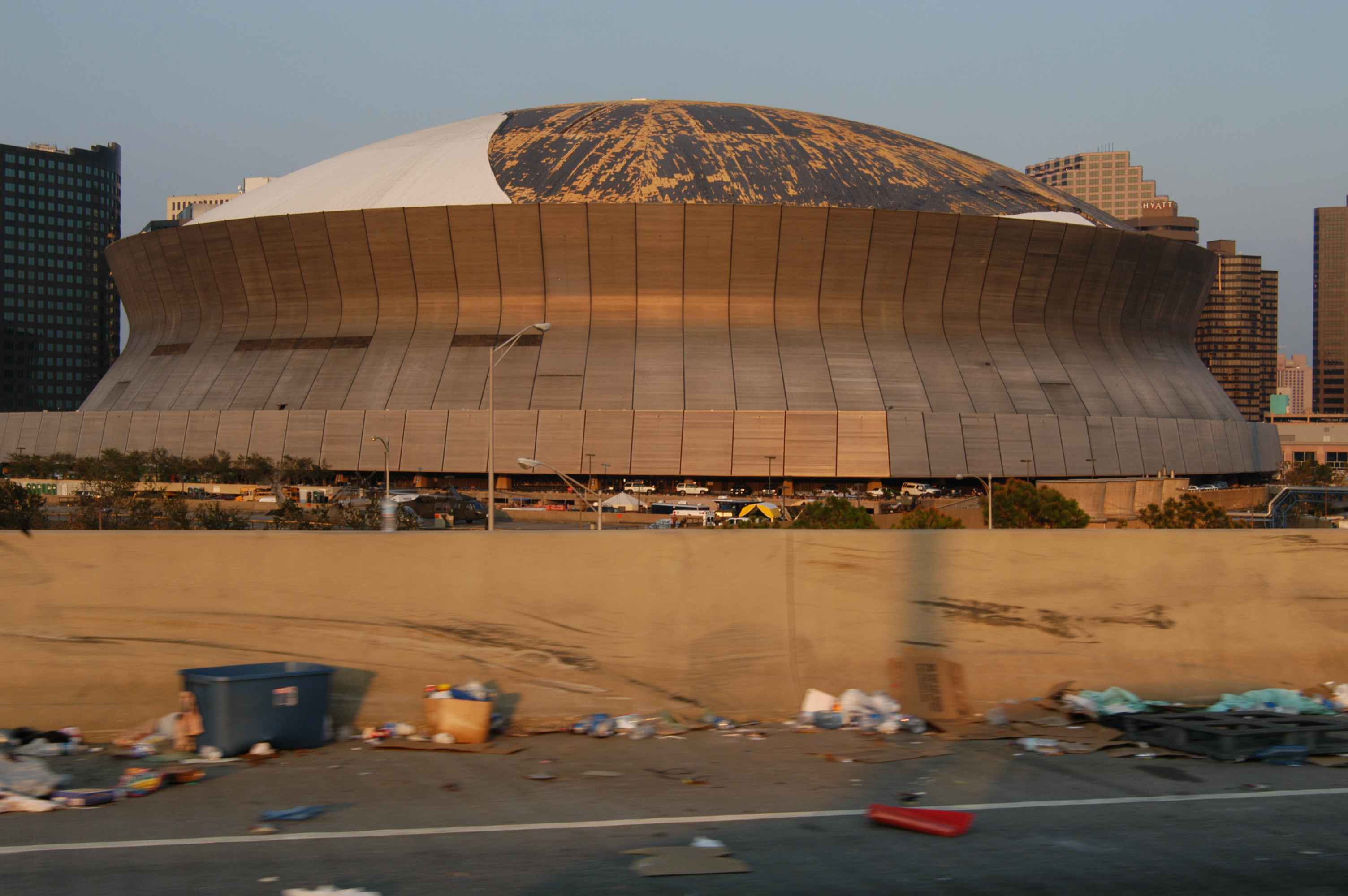
Damage to the Superdome as a result of Katrina

Evacuees were brought to the Superdome, one of the largest structures in the city, to wait out the storm or to await further evacuation. Many others made their way to the Superdome on their own, hoping to find food, water, shelter, or transport out of town. As Katrina passed over New Orleans on August 29, it ripped two holes in the Superdome roof. The area outside the Superdome was flooded to a depth of 3 feet (0.91 m), with a possibility of 7 feet (2.1 m) if the area equalized with Lake Pontchartrain. On the evening of August 30, Maj. Gen. Bennett C. Landreneau of the Louisiana National Guard said that the number of people taking shelter in the Superdome had risen to around 15,000 to 20,000 as search and rescue teams brought more people to the Superdome from areas hard-hit by the flooding.

Population density, lack of food and facilities, and structural damage led to increasingly squalid conditions for survivors. The situation inside the building was described as chaotic; reports of rampant drug use, fights, rapes, and filthy living conditions were widespread. At the time, as many as 100 were reported to have died in the Superdome, with most deaths resulting from heat exhaustion, but other reported incidents included an accused rapist who was beaten to death by a crowd and an apparent suicide. The reports appear to have been exaggerated: the final official death toll in the Superdome came to six people inside (4 of natural causes, one overdose, and an apparent suicide) and a few more in the general area outside the stadium.

On August 31, as flood waters continued to rise, Governor Blanco ordered that all of New Orleans, including the Superdome, be evacuated. Governor Blanco sent 68 school buses to transport the evacuating people. FEMA announced that, in conjunction with Greyhound, the National Guard, and Houston Metro, the 25,000 people at the Superdome would be relocated across state lines to the Houston Astrodome. Roughly 475 buses were provided by FEMA to transport evacuees, with the entire operation taking 2–3 days. By September 4, the Superdome had been completely evacuated.

Although the Superdome suffered damage by water and wind to the overall interior and exterior structures, as well as interior damage from human waste and trash, the facility was repaired at a cost of US$185 million and was ready for games by the autumn of 2006.

=== New Orleans Convention Center ===
Because of Hurricane Katrina, the Ernest N. Morial Convention Center suffered a loss of water access and electricity, and one of its convention halls had a large hole in its ceiling. The center was otherwise only lightly damaged.

On August 29, as people were being turned away at the Superdome and rescues continued, rescuers began dropping people off at the Convention Center, which, at 8 feet (2 m) above sea level, easily escaped the flood. Captain M.A. Pfeiffer of the NOPD was quoted as saying, “It was supposed to be a bus stop where they dropped people off for transportation. The problem was, the transportation never came.” By the afternoon of the 29th, the crowd had grown to about 1,000 people. The convention center’s president (who was there with a small group of convention center employees at this time) addressed the crowd near dark, informing them that there was no food, water, medical care, or other services. By late on the evening of the 29th, the convention center had been broken into, and evacuees began occupying the inside of the convention center.

A contingent of 250 National Guard engineering units occupied one part of the convention center beginning August 30 and remained there until September 1, at times barricaded in their location. The units were never given orders to control the crowd, and were not expected to be prepared for such a task, as engineering units. The number of people at the convention center continued to grow over the next three days by some estimates to as many as 20,000 people. Reasons for arriving included being sent to the convention center from the overwhelmed Superdome, being dropped off there by rescuers, or hearing about the convention center as a shelter via word of mouth. No checking for weapons was done among the crowd as was done at the Superdome, and a large store of alcohol kept at the Convention Center was looted. Reports of robberies, murder, and rapes began to surface, in particular that a 14-year-old girl had been raped and that seven dead bodies were lying on the third floor. In general, those who died, regardless of cause of death, were not moved or removed and were left to decompose.

By September 1, the facility, like the Superdome, was completely overwhelmed and declared unsafe and unsanitary. However, even though there were thousands of people who were evacuating at the center, along with network newscasters, pleading desperately for help on CNN, FOX, and other broadcast outlets, FEMA head Michael Brown and Homeland Security Secretary Michael Chertoff both claimed that they had no knowledge of the usage of the Convention Center as a shelter until the afternoon of September 1.

A sizable contingent of National Guard arrived on September 2 to establish order and provide essential provisions, and on September 3, buses began arriving at the convention center to pick up the refugees there. The Convention Center was completely evacuated by September 4.

=== Charity Hospital ===
Charity Hospital had most of its windows blown out and suffered damage to lights and ceiling tiles as a result of the strong winds caused by Katrina. Later that day, floodwaters began to fill up the building, which caused the main generators to fail, so the hospital staff decided to evacuate everyone to the auditorium. Conditions in the auditorium began to deteriorate, so everyone was evacuated to the roof. On September 1, the first 100 medically ill patients were taken on Sikorsky UH-60 Black Hawk helicopters to Baton Rouge. The remaining persons were evacuated the next day at about 3 pm. Eight people had died. Reports stated that some people were so desperate for food and water that they used intravenous therapy to receive nutrients.

=== Evacuation efforts ===
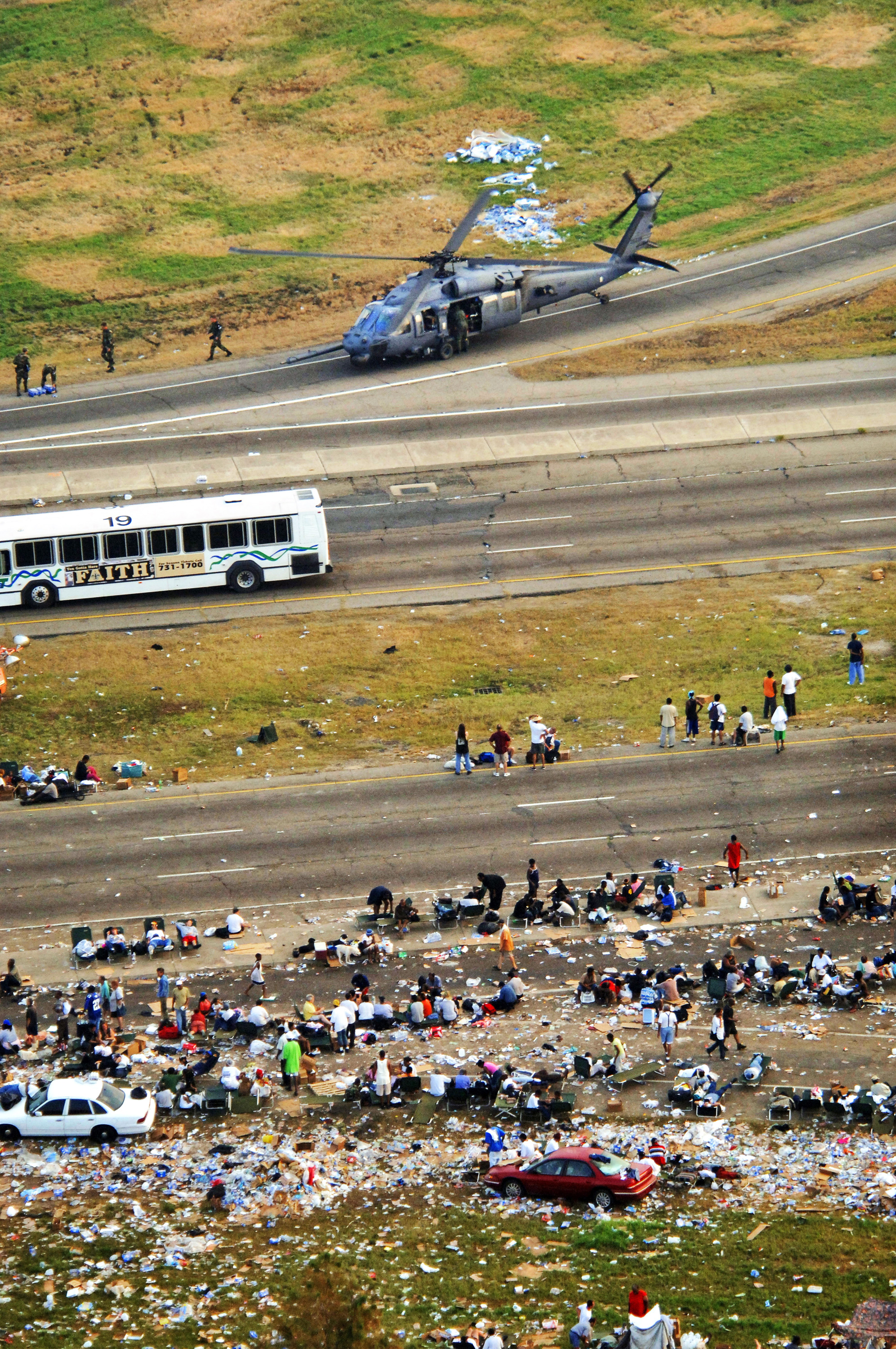
Hurricane evacuees in Metairie, Louisiana, being helped by the US Air National Guard on September 3

On August 31, a public health emergency was declared for the entire Gulf Coast, and Louisiana Governor Kathleen Blanco ordered a mandatory evacuation of all those remaining in New Orleans. Relief organizations scrambled to locate suitable areas for relocating evacuees on a large scale. Many people in the Superdome were bussed to Reliant Park in Houston, Texas. Houston agreed to shelter an additional 25,000 evacuees beyond those admitted to the Astrodome, including one “renegade bus” that was commandeered by private citizen Jabbar Gibson, who had been released on bond from the Orleans Parish Prison just days before the storm hit, and had a previous criminal conviction. By September 1, the Astrodome was declared full and could not accept any more evacuees. The George R. Brown Convention Center and the Reliant Center and Reliant Arena nearby were all opened to house additional evacuees. By September 2, the Reliant Center had 3,000 evacuees. San Antonio, Texas also agreed to house 25,000 refugees, initiating relocation efforts in vacant office buildings on the grounds of KellyUSA, a former air force base. Reunion Arena in Dallas, Texas was also mobilized to house incoming evacuees, and smaller shelters were established in towns across Texas and Oklahoma. Arkansas also opened various shelters and state parks throughout the state for evacuees.

Expected to last only two days, the evacuation of remaining evacuees proved more difficult than rescue organizations anticipated as transportation convoys struggled with damaged infrastructure and a growing number of evacuees. On September 3, the Texas Air National Guard reported that 2,500 evacuees were still at the Superdome. However, by evening, eleven hours after evacuation efforts began, the Superdome held 10,000 more people than it did at dawn. Evacuees from across the city swelled the crowd to about 30,000, believing the arena was the best place to get a ride out of town.

Evacuation efforts were hastened on September 2 by the wider dispersal of evacuees among newly opened shelters. Louis Armstrong International Airport was reopened to allow flights related to relief efforts, and began to load evacuees onto planes as well.

Elements of the 82nd Airborne Division arrived in New Orleans September 3. The flooding was a challenge for the paratroopers when they first arrived. The division had just four boats at the time, however, the division quickly started getting Coast Guard, Navy and Marine assets placed under their control. Army Maj. Gen. William B. Caldwell IV, the 82nd’s commanding general, noted: “We eventually became the 82nd ‘Waterborne’ Division,” the general said, “and that really was our forte” during search-and-rescue and security missions in flooded sections of the city.

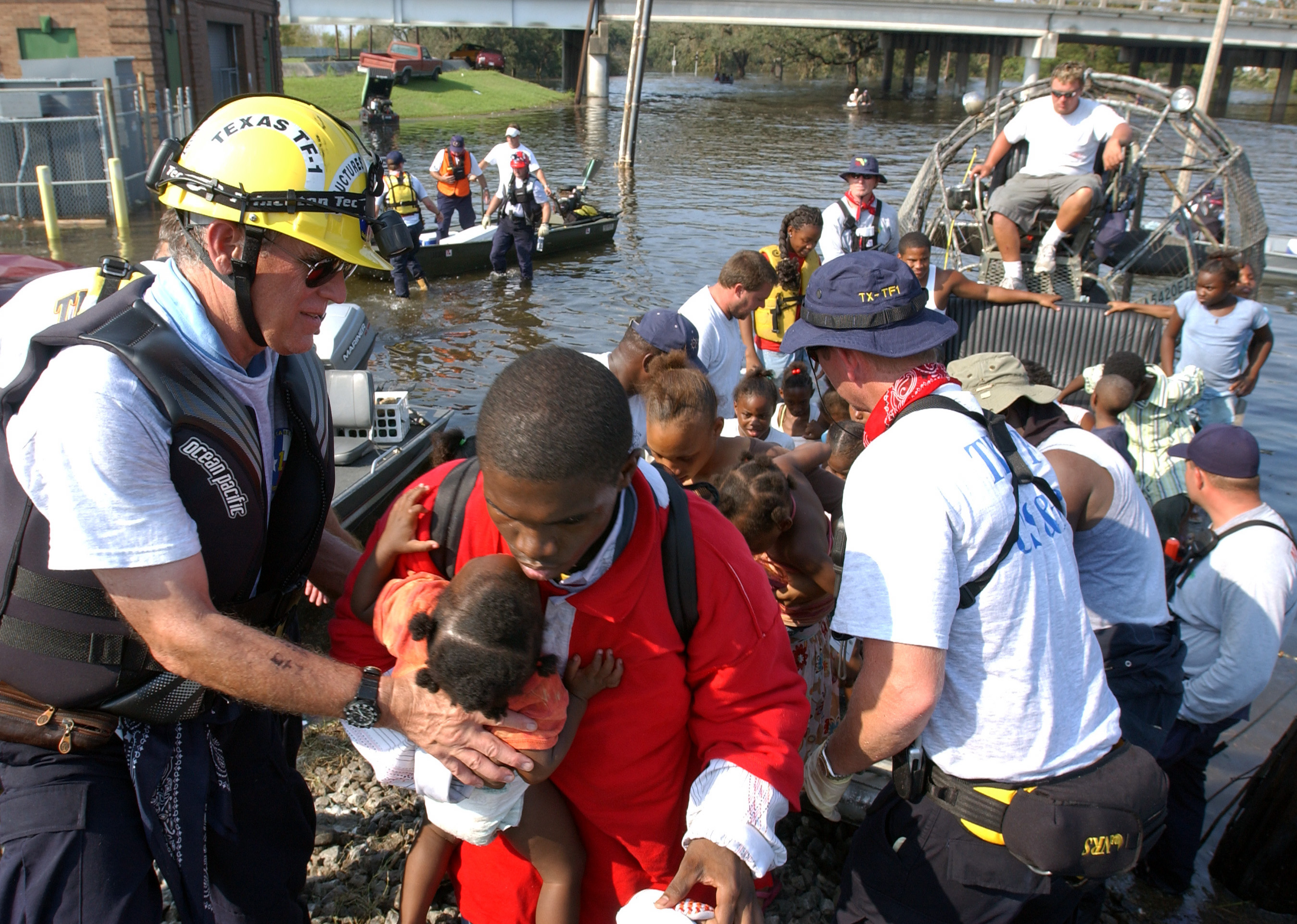
Rescue teams evacuating residents from flooded areas on August 30

Task Force Katrina Commander Army Lt. Gen. Russel Honoré also charged the paratroopers to straighten out the evacuation situations at the New Orleans Airport, the Convention Center and the Superdome. In all, 3,600 of the division’s paratroopers were deployed to New Orleans to participate in Task Force All-American. The unit worked in tandem with state, local and other federal authorities to feed, process and transport evacuees to other accommodations; the division’s soldiers helped evacuate 6,000 New Orleans residents. By September 18, the 82nd Division medical personnel had treated 1,352 people and given 2,047 immunizations, according to unit documents. By September 19, 82nd Division military engineers had cleared 185 city blocks of debris, cleared 113 streets, and removed 218 trees, according to unit documents.

On September 3, some 42,000 evacuees were evacuated from New Orleans, including those remaining in the Superdome and Convention Center. Efforts turned to the hundreds of people still trapped in area hotels, hospitals, schools and private homes. During the evacuation, one person was killed and 7 others injured when the bus in which they were heading to Texas overturned on Interstate 49 in Opelousas, LA. Opelousas Police lieutenant Dwain Grimmett said the bus driver lost control on dry pavement.

On September 6, Mayor Ray Nagin ordered a forced evacuation of everyone from the city who was not involved in clean up work, citing safety and health concerns. The order was given not only as an attempt to restore law and order but also out of concern about the hazardous living conditions in the city. Eviction efforts escalated three days later when door-to-door searches were conducted to advise remaining residents to leave the city. Despite this, a number of residents defied the eviction order. While initially lax in enforcing evictions, National Guard troops eventually began to remove residents by force.

=== Health effects ===
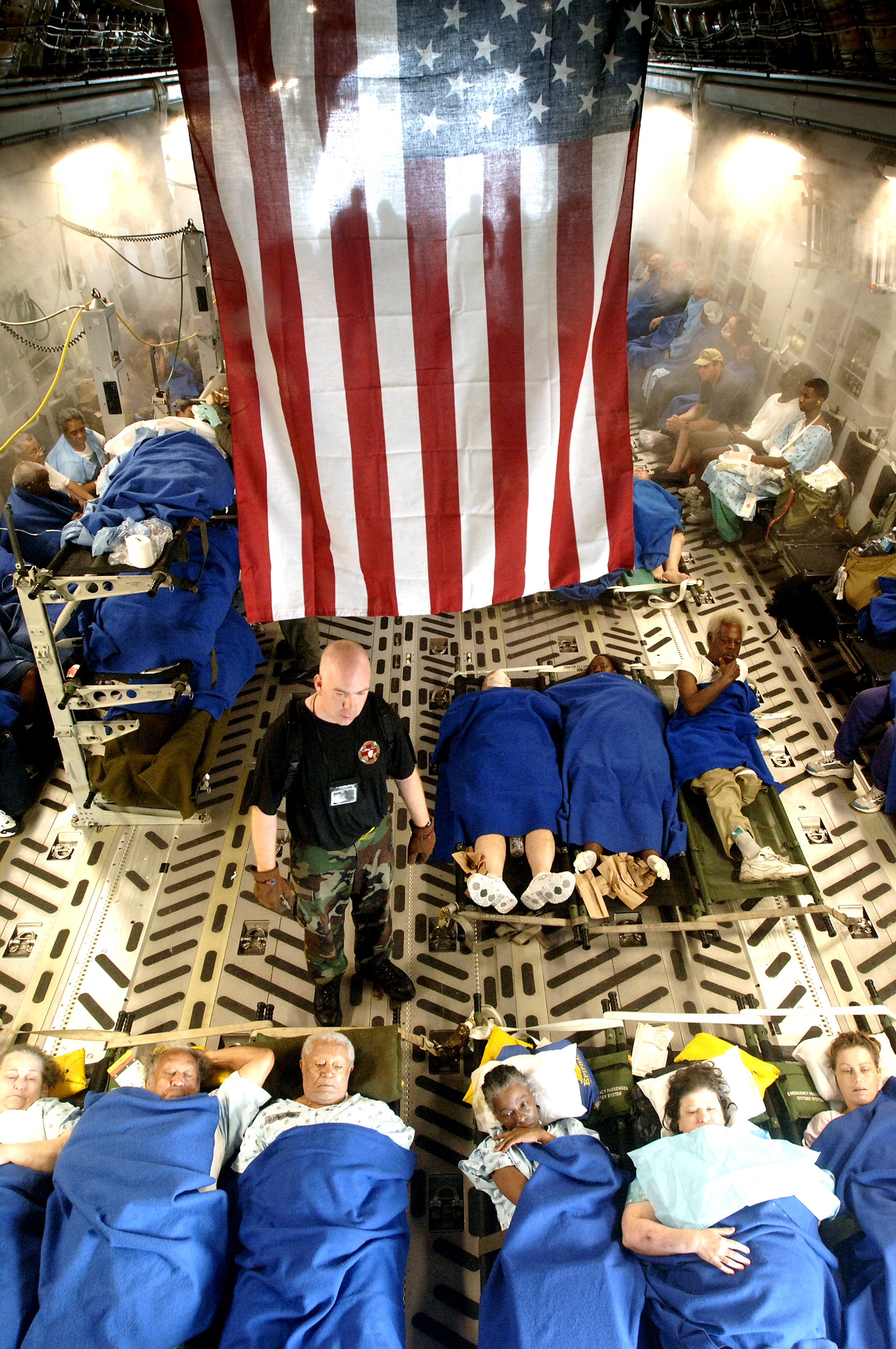
Sick and injured people being evacuated aboard a C-17 Globemaster III

There was a concern that the prolonged flooding would lead to an outbreak of health problems for those who remained in the city. In addition to dehydration and food poisoning, there was also potential for the spread of hepatitis A, cholera, tuberculosis, and typhoid fever, all related to the growing contamination of food and drinking water supplies in the city compounded by the city’s characteristic heat and stifling humidity. Survivors could also face long-term health risks due to prolonged exposure to the petrochemical tainted flood waters and mosquito-borne diseases such as yellow fever, malaria, and West Nile fever.

On September 2, an emergency triage center was set up at the airport. A steady stream of helicopters and ambulances brought in the elderly, sick, and injured. Baggage equipment was used as gurneys to transport people from the flight line to the hospital, which was set up in the airport terminal. The scene could be described as, “organized chaos”, but efficient. By September 3, the situation started to stabilize. Up to 5,000 people had been triaged and fewer than 200 remained at the medical unit.

Hospital evacuations continued from other area hospitals that were flooded or damaged. Reports from the Methodist Hospital indicated that people were dying of dehydration and exhaustion while the staff worked constantly in horrendous conditions. The first floor of the hospital flooded and the dead were stacked in a second floor operating room. Patients requiring ventilators were kept alive with hand-powered resuscitation bags.

Among the many hospitals shut down by damage related to the hurricane was the public hospital serving New Orleans, Charity Hospital, which was also the only trauma center serving that region. The destruction of the hospital’s structure has forced the continued closure as funding for a new building is sought out.

=== Pediatric evacuation ===
Multiple children’s hospitals around the United States including Arkansas Children's Hospital, Texas Children's Hospital, Children's of Alabama, Le Bonheur Children's Hospital, Cook Children's Medical Center, and Children's Mercy Kansas City sent helicopters, fixed wing aircraft, ambulances, and personnel to Tulane Medical Center, Ochsner, and CHNOLA in order to help evacuate pediatric patients from the hospital.

=== Economy ===
Before Katrina’s landfall in 2005, the economy of New Orleans relied heavily on its usefulness and income derived from being a port city. The population grew and the economy peaked in the late 19th century. However, in the recent years, after rapid industrialization and the development of faster methods of transporting goods, the economy of New Orleans has been in a steady decline. As a result, New Orleans came to rely on three major industries for economic revenue: transportation, entertainment, and public services. However, after Katrina’s landfall, these sectors, including the overall economy, were reduced and heavily affected by the natural disaster.

After the hurricane, the labor force diminished and wages decreased by staggering amounts. In July 2005, 9,592 people applied for unemployment services and the payroll of metropolitan firms declined by 13.6% between July 2005 and July 2007, indicating an estimated loss of 70,000 jobs. The sectors most affected were service-related industries, fluctuating with the population. The only sector to truly thrive after landfall was construction, which was in high demand to make needed repairs and rebuild destroyed homes.

In the first initial months following Katrina, the labor force reduced faster than the demand and unemployment rates skyrocketed. However, as of September 2006, the unemployment rates have never fallen below the national average, indicating improvement. In the second quarters of both 2005 and 2007, the firms’ wages were increased by 21%, twice more than national increases, indicating even further improvement, although the gains were varied across the sectors.

There have been some suggestions concerning the usage of natural capital to further aid New Orleans’s economy. One such proposal is to avoid rebuilding on flooded lands, instead restoring acres of wetlands to profit from the economic wealth. The Mississippi River Delta provides the United States with one of the largest fisheries and the most important flyway terminus, enabling New Orleans to profit from these ecological industries. Furthermore, by increasing the wetlands, it would help create a natural barrier that could aid New Orleans in future storms. It is estimated that if New Orleans was to restore 1,700 square miles (4,400 km^{2}) of wetland lost before 2005, the natural capital would be worth an estimated $6 billion/year, or $200 billion at the present value. While New Orleans has made numerous efforts in rebuilding their economy, and has been successful with tourist-attracting events such as Mardi Gras, the natural capital provided could further assist the city in returning to its pre-Katrina wealth and economy.

== Racial disparities ==
Following Katrina, many said that the hurricane had a greater impact on Black and less economically privileged people than it had on predominantly white and wealthier people. “The city’s remarkable recovery has, to a troubling degree, left behind the African-Americans who still make up the majority of its population,” according to FiveThirtyEight. They based this on statistics showing that Black residents of New Orleans are more likely to be unemployed than when the storm hit, and they are also more likely to be living in poverty. Household incomes of Black people have also fallen, and the wage gap between Black and white people has grown.

About 175,000 Black residents departed New Orleans over the year following the storm, while only 100,000 returned, pushing the African American population to 59%, from 66% previously. The biggest impact has been on Black middle-class people, given that most Black professionals are older and more advanced in their careers, and the majority of the affluent and middle class are white.

These setbacks to the Black population in New Orleans corresponded with a large number of educated white arrivals, contributing to a high rate of business formation in the city. These newcomers have had the effect of driving up housing prices, making rent less affordable for the majority of Black residents.

The influence of Black people in the city receded politically, too: in 2010 New Orleans elected its first white mayor in 32 years, a white majority (5–2) took control of the City Council, which had previously been Black, and a white police chief and district attorney were elected. Lance Hill of Tulane University said: “The perception among most African-Americans is that they are living politically as a defeated group in their own city.”

After Hurricane Katrina, many African-Americans suffered from mental illnesses—such as PTSD—at higher rates than their white counterparts. Populations experiencing mental illnesses, especially after a natural disaster, is not uncommon. African-Americans, however, “had approximately two-fold greater odds of screening positive for PTSD” after Hurricane Katrina than white people. It is deduced that African-Americans exhibit PTSD at higher frequencies than white people because they “were more likely to experience frequent mental distress.” For example, African-Americans “report more negative events and chronic stressors–witnessing violence, receiving bad news, death events, lifetime major discrimination, daily discrimination–than whites, which negatively affects their mental health.” African-Americans “are more segregated than any other racial/ethnic group in the United States, and racial segregation is associated with poorer quality housing and neighborhoods that have limited resources to enhance health and well-being.” Another study found that “Black race was associated with greater symptom severity” of PTSD than other races. It is known that, “Minority status itself has been shown to increase the risk of PTSD after trauma, though this effect may be largely because of differential exposure to poverty and violence.” Additionally, the “largely Black population of New Orleans bore a disproportionately heavy burden of pre disaster chronic disease complicated by inadequate health care access.”

== See also ==
- Disaster Recovery Personal Protection Act of 2006
- Displacement after Hurricane Katrina
- Effects of Hurricane Katrina in the Southeastern United States
- Great Mississippi Flood of 1927
- Hurricane on the Bayou (film)
- Memorial Medical Center and Hurricane Katrina
- Posse Comitatus Act
- Reconstruction of New Orleans
- Seabrook Floodgate
- Six Flags New Orleans
- U.S. Army Corps of Engineers civil works controversies (New Orleans)
- When the Levees Broke (film)
- Zeitoun (book)
