= Interdictor (blog) =

LiveJournal blog operated by Michael Barnett

Interdictor is a LiveJournal blog that documented the effects of Hurricane Katrina in New Orleans during and following the destruction. It is operated by Michael Barnett. At the time he was an employee of Directnic.com, an internet services company on the 10th and 11th floors of an office building in downtown New Orleans at 650 Poydras Avenue, which he referred to as "Outpost Crystal" (after Barnett's fiancée, Crystal Coleman). Daniel Gifford, another employee of directNIC.com, also contributed many articles to the blog. In the early aftermath of the hurricane and flooding, it was one of the few reliable communications links between downtown New Orleans and the rest of the world.

== Operation during Hurricane Katrina ==
Operating on a diesel generator when power was lost, Barnett and fellow bloggers provided a continuous stream of reports of what was actually happening and, through webcams, live video feeds, and thousands of high resolution pictures, gave the rest of the world a chance to see the looting and destruction firsthand before the rest of the media arrived on the scene. Using Internet Relay Chat and instant messaging they kept in constant contact with the outside world.

=== Use as source by other media ===
The Interdictor blog quickly became a widely recognized and cited source from inside New Orleans. Sources such as CNN even read directly from the blog on the air, putting its contents on-screen. Even after the media arrived, the Interdictor blog was still commonly cited as a reference to the events ongoing in New Orleans. The blog's debut and rise to prominence during the hurricane and its aftermath was listed in an MSN/PC World article as number 14 on a list of "The 16 Greatest Moments in Web History".

== Activity since the hurricane ==
Currently the blog is used by Barnett to discuss issues related to New Orleans specifically and politics generally. It has a distinctly libertarian slant as Barnett is a self-described Austrian School economist, libertarian and anarcho-capitalist.

== See also ==
- Gulfsails, another Katrina-related blog
