= Gulfsails =

Gulfsails is the name of a blog, written by Troy Gilbert, that documented the effect of Hurricane Katrina on New Orleans following that disaster. In the early aftermath of the hurricane and the 2005 levee failures in Greater New Orleans, it was one of the few reliable communications links between the city and the rest of the world.

Gulfsails was originally created for New Orleans Yacht Club members, ten days before Hurricane Katrina made landfall. Operating off of a generator when power was lost and uploading via a landline phone and cell phone, the operator provided a continuous stream of reports of what was actually happening, and through photographs, text messaging and audio feeds gave the outside a chance to see the destruction firsthand before other media arrived.

The Gulfsails blog quickly became a widely recognized and cited source from inside New Orleans, appearing in The New York Times, the Times Picayune, and MSNBC. Even after the media arrived, the Gulfsails blog was still commonly cited as a reference to the events ongoing in New Orleans. When a police-enforced evacuation of New Orleans was ordered by Mayor Ray Nagin, the operator of the blog continued to travel through many parts of the city, including by canoe, documenting the worst natural disaster to ever befall the United States.

Excerpts of the blog have been published in the books A Howling in the Wires and Please Forward.

== See also ==
- Interdictor, another Katrina-related blog
