= Andy Baio =

American technologist and blogger (born 1977)

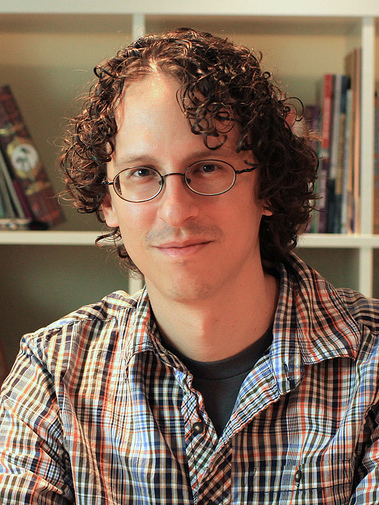
- Andy Baio in 2012
- Born: 1977 (age 48–49); United States
- Occupations: Blogger; technologist
- Known for: Waxy.org; XOXO; Upcoming
- Website: waxy.org

Andy Baio (born 1977) is an American technologist and blogger. He is the co-founder of the XOXO festival, founder of the Upcoming social calendar website, a former CTO of Kickstarter, and the author of the Waxy.org blog.

== Career ==
In 2003, while working as a webmaster at a Texas-based financial company, Baio launched the Upcoming collaborative event calendar. The site was acquired by Yahoo for $2 million in 2005 and Baio joined the company as the site's Technical Director. In 2007, Baio announced his departure from Yahoo.

In September 2008, Baio joined the board of directors of Kickstarter, a crowdfunding website that helps people with project ideas to connect with potential funders. Baio later joined the staff as Chief Technical Officer in July 2009, stepping down in November 2010 to join Expert Labs. After Yahoo closed Upcoming and offered to sell the domain back to Baio, he launched a Kickstarter campaign that surpassed its $30,000 goal in May 2014 to revive the site.

In June 2017, Baio joined the Fuzzco creative studio as Technology Director.

In October 2018, Baio and his fellow XOXO festival cofounder Andy McMillan announced they would be taking over Drip, a creator funding platform that Kickstarter had acquired in 2016. Kickstarter continued to run the platform while Baio and McMillan took it over, and Kickstarter provided the duo with seed funding. Baio and McMillan started a public-benefit corporation, separate from Kickstarter, to run the project. However, in mid-2019, they shut it down before launching and returned the remaining funding to Kickstarter, saying that they could not find a way to sustainably run the business without exposing the creators who would rely on it to too much risk.

In 2021, Baio launched the Skittish virtual event platform, where participants could move around as virtual animal avatars and interact with other inhabitants via spatial voice chat. Wired described the project as "equal parts audio chat, serendipity, and Animal Crossing." The platform was funded with a grant from Grant for the Web, a program in turn funded by Mozilla, Creative Commons, and a micropayments startup. Skittish shut down in December 2022.

=== Media ===
Baio was involved in the early dissemination of the Star Wars Kid viral video, which depicted teenager Ghyslain Raza clumsily emulating martial arts moves for the camera. In response to the negative attention the boy received, Baio and another blogger, Jish Mukerji, organized a fundraiser for Raza which gathered almost $1,000 from about 100 donors. In 2021, Baio met Raza and apologized to him for amplifying the video. Baio later said in the documentary Star Wars Kid: The Rise of the Digital Shadows that he had "enormous regret about posting the video." Raza accepted his apology, saying that Baio "provides a beautiful lesson of humanity that a good person can make a mistake and that mistake can have very important consequences but that, at the end of the day, Andy could be like any one of us."

When the parody cartoon House of Cosbys was taken down from its original site due to a cease and desist letter from Bill Cosby's attorney, Baio placed the videos on his own website. Baio later received a similar cease and desist letter but refused to comply, citing fair use and decrying what he termed "a special kind of discrimination against amateur creators on the Internet", since Cosby had often been parodied in the mainstream media.

In 2009, Baio produced Kind of Bloop, a chiptune tribute album commemorating the 50th anniversary of Miles Davis' Kind of Blue. The album's cover was a pixel art version of the original album's cover, which consisted of a photograph taken by Jay Maisel. Attorneys representing Maisel demanded damages and that the resulting image be removed from the chiptune album, resulting in a settlement of $32,500 from Baio.

Baio has written for Wired magazine and The New York Times, and was a staffer on R. U. Sirius' online magazine GettingIt.com. Baio coined the term supercut in 2008, which in 2017 became known through the song "Supercut" by singer Lorde.

Baio has blogged at Waxy.org since 2002, and is considered to be one of the first linkbloggers.

=== XOXO festival ===
In early 2012, Baio and Andy McMillan co-founded the XOXO festival, which describes itself as "an experimental festival celebrating independent artists and creators working on the internet". The conference was held annually in Portland, Oregon, from 2012 to 2019 and in 2024. The conferences were largely funded via prepaid tickets and other contributions, including via Kickstarter. Baio describes the conference as a "consensual hallucination", using William Gibson's 1984 description for cyberspace.

In 2015, Baio and McMillan worked to open Outpost, a shared, pay-what-you-can workspace in Portland for members of the XOXO community. Outspace was open from February to December 2016, but ultimately shuttered due to high rental costs.

== Personal life ==
Baio was born in 1977. His mother is journalism professor Toni Allen, who was the head of the journalism department at Oxnard College.

Baio lives in Portland, Oregon. He has a son, who was born in 2004. Baio is colorblind.
