= Numa Numa =

Internet meme based on video by Gary Brolsma

- Gary Brolsma in the video
- Produced by: Gary Brolsma
- Starring: Gary Brolsma
- Release date: December 6, 2004
- Running time: 1 minute
- Country: United States
- Language: Romanian

"Numa Numa" (/ˈnuːmə/) is an Internet meme based on a viral video by American vlogger Gary Brolsma, in which he lip-syncs to the song "Dragostea din tei" with lively dance moves. Brolsma's video, entitled "Numa Numa Dance", was uploaded to the website Newgrounds on December 6, 2004, under the username Gman250. The video's title is derived from the Romanian words "nu mă nu mă" occurring in the refrain of O-Zone's song, which was the first Numa Numa-themed video to gain widespread attention.

Numa Numa Dance is considered one of the web's most important viral videos, and, much like the video Evolution of Dance by Judson Laipply, inspired many YouTube viewers to make accounts and pursue YouTube careers. It has since spawned many parody videos, including those created for the New Numa Contest, sponsored by Brolsma, which promised US$45,000 in prize money for submissions. His original video was named 41st in the 2006 broadcast of 100 Greatest Funny Moments by Channel 4 in the United Kingdom. The video was featured on Channel 4's Virtually Famous, and ranked No. 1 in VH1's "40 Greatest Internet Superstars" in March 2007. The Viral Factory estimated that the video had been viewed over 700 million times by November 27, 2006.

== History ==
On Newgrounds, Numa Numa Dance has since earned over 8,000,000 views, from which it has been reposted to hundreds of websites. A 2006 BBC report claimed that Numa Numa Dance was the second most-watched viral video of all time, with 700 million views accumulated, losing out merely to the "Star Wars kid", based on page impression figures collated by viral marketing company The Viral Factory. Brolsma received mainstream media's coverage from ABC's Good Morning America, NBC's The Tonight Show with Jay Leno, VH1's Best Week Ever, with Numa Numa having been listed as No. 1 on VH1s Top 40 Internet Superstars.

The New York Times said that Brolsma was an "unwilling and embarrassed Web celebrity" however. He cancelled media appearances, but reappeared in September 2006 with a professionally produced video, New Numa or Numa Numa 2 (Note: Not to be confused with the Dan Balan remix of the song released in 2018.), featuring a song dedicated to him by the Variety Beats. This video, hosted on YouTube, marked the start of the "New Numa Contest", which promised US$45,000 in prize money and a US$25,000 award to the winner. On May 23, 2008, Brolsma was featured alongside other internet celebrities in the music video of Weezer's song "Pork and Beans", from their self-titled 2008 album Weezer.

On December 5, 2014, Brolsma uploaded a video entitled Numa Numa 10-Year Reunion to the Newgrounds. The video featured his lip-syncing of several songs, including "Shake It Off" by Taylor Swift, "Don't Think Twice, It's All Right" by Bob Dylan and "Firework" by Katy Perry. Both the original video and 10-Year Reunion video have been deleted by the moderation team of the Newgrounds over music licensing issues. Brolsma later stated in an interview, "...I found "Dragostea Din Tei" in another (I believe it was Japanese) flash animation with cartoon cats".

On April 1, 2017, Brolsma uploaded the original video to his own YouTube channel. On November 20, 2022, an emote based on the viral dance was released in Epic Games' Fortnite: Battle Royale as a collaboration with Brolsma and O-Zone. On May 11, 2023, the video was permanently deleted from the original channel, formerly Numa Networks – now named the Dork Daily, on livestream due to threats of a copyright strike from Brolsma.

On 11 August 2023, Brolsma released a remake of his 2004 video on his YouTube channel. As of 17 October 2024, the remake has accumulated 1,771,125 views.

In October 2026, Brolsma appeared as a cameo in a recreation of the 2004 video in Mozilla's Come Back to Firefox advertising campaign, alongside several other viral internet personalities from the 2000s and 2010s. The campaign used nostalgia for early internet culture to promote Firefox.

== Gary Brolsma ==
Gary Brolsma
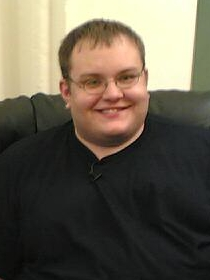
- Brolsma in 2006
- Born: Gary William Brolsma; January 14, 1986 (age 40); Saddle Brook, New Jersey, U.S.
- Other names: Gman250; The Numa Numa Guy
- Notable work: "Numa Numa Dance"

Gary William Brolsma (born January 14, 1986) is an American vlogger and musician who gained worldwide attention after posting the Numa Numa Dance video in 2004. He made appearances on ABC's Good Morning America, NBC's The Tonight Show and VH1's Best Week Ever. A 2006 story in The Believer explored the song's spread and global homogenization, while arguing that Brolsma's video "singlehandedly justifies the existence of webcams... It's a movie of someone who is having the time of his life, wants to share his joy with everyone, and doesn't care what anyone else thinks." In 2007, he was voted the Number 1 Internet Icon by VH1 in their 40 Greatest Internet Superstars list, beating the Star Wars kid who placed at Number 2.

On October 15, 2007, The New York Times reported that Brolsma had collaborated on a video with lonelygirl15's Glenn Rubenstein, and Chad Vader's Aaron Yonda and Matt Sloan as a part of Canon's Battle of the Viral Video Superstars. In 2008, Brolsma released his first album, Weird Tempo. In 2019, he released his second album, Haunted House of Pancakes.
