= Lifehacker =

Software and life hacks website and blog

- Website type: Blog
- Available in: English, Japanese
- Owner: Ziff Davis
- Creator: Gina Trapani
- Editor: Jordan Calhoun
- Website: lifehacker.com
- Commercial: Yes
- Registration: Optional, through OpenWeb
- Launched: January 31, 2005; 21 years ago

Lifehacker is a weblog about life hacks and software that launched on January 31, 2005. The site was originally launched by Gawker Media and is owned by Ziff Davis. The blog posts cover a wide range of topics including Microsoft Windows, Macintosh, Linux programs, iOS, and Android, as well as general life tips and tricks. The website is known for its fast-paced release schedule from its inception, with content being published every half-hour all day long.

Lifehacker has international editions: Lifehacker Australia (as of 2022 owned by Pedestrian), Lifehacker Japan, and Lifehacker UK, which feature most posts from the U.S. edition along with extra content specific to local readers. Lifehacker UK folded on September 9, 2020, when its British publisher decided not to renew its license.

== History ==
The Lifehacker logo used from its founding in 2005 until November 2023

Gina Trapani founded Lifehacker and was the site's sole blogger until September 2005, when two associate editors joined her, Erica Sadun and D. Keith Robinson. Other former associate editors include Wendy Boswell, Rick Broida, Jason Fitzpatrick, Kevin Purdy, and Jackson West. Former contributing editors include The How-To Geek and Tamar Weinberg. Lifehacker launched in January 2005 with an exclusive sponsorship by Sony. The highly publicized ad campaign was rumored to have cost $75,000 for three months. Lifehacker Australia launched in 2007, and Lifehacker Japan launched in 2008.

Since its founding, a variety of tech-oriented advertisers have appeared on the site. Lifehacker's frequent guest posts have included articles by Joe Anderson, Eszter Hargittai, Matt Haughey, Meg Hourihan, and Jeff Jarvis. On January 16, 2009, Trapani resigned as Lifehacker's lead editor and Adam Pash assumed the position. On February 7, 2011, Lifehacker's website was redesigned with a cleaner, yet polarizing layout that led to readership declines. On April 15, 2013, Lifehacker redesigned their site again to match the other newly redesigned Gawker sites like Kotaku. On January 7, 2013, Adam Pash left Lifehacker for a new startup, and Whitson Gordon became the new editor-in-chief. On January 1, 2016, Whitson Gordon left Lifehacker for another popular technology website, How-To Geek, replacing editor-in-chief Lowell Heddings.

In his January 2016 announcement, Gordon confirmed that Alan Henry would take over as the interim editor pending interviewing processes. Henry became the new editor-in-chief on February 1, 2016. On February 3, 2017, Henry left his position at Lifehacker. He later wrote for The New York Times. On February 28, 2017, Melissa Kirsch became the editor-in-chief. Alice Bradley was named editor-in-chief in June 2020 but left in March 2021. Former deputy editor Jordan Calhoun succeeded her as editor-in-chief.

Lifehacker was one of six websites that was purchased by Univision Communications in its acquisition of Gawker Media in August 2016. On March 13, 2023, it was announced that Lifehacker had been sold from G/O Media to Ziff Davis. In November 2023, as part of a brand refocus after the acquisition, Lifehacker updated with a new logo, a new site layout, and migration away from the Kinja platform.

In July 2024, it was reported that Lifehacker Australia would shut down amid a restructuring at third-party publisher Pedestrian Group.

== Accolades ==
Time named Lifehacker one of the "50 Coolest Web Sites" in 2005, one of the "25 Sites We Can't Live Without" in 2006, and one of the "25 Best Blogs" in 2009. CNET named Lifehacker in their "Blog 100" in October 2005. Wired presented Gina Trapani with a Rave Award in 2006 for Best Blog. In the 2007 Weblog Awards, Lifehacker was awarded Best Group Weblog. PC Magazine named Lifehacker in "Our Favorite 100 Blogs" in October 2007. US Mensa named Lifehacker as one of their top 50 sites in 2010.
