= Kottke =

Kottke is a surname. Notable people with the surname include:

- Daniel Kottke, American computer engineer, first official Apple Computer employee
- Jason Kottke, American blogger
- Leo Kottke, American guitarist
