= Andy McMillan =

Andy McMillan may refer to:

- Andy McMillan (designer), British designer
- Andy McMillan (soccer) (born 1968), South African soccer player and manager

== See also ==
- Andy MacMillan, Scottish architect, educator, writer and broadcaster
