= Evan Williams (internet entrepreneur) =

American entrepreneur (born 1972)

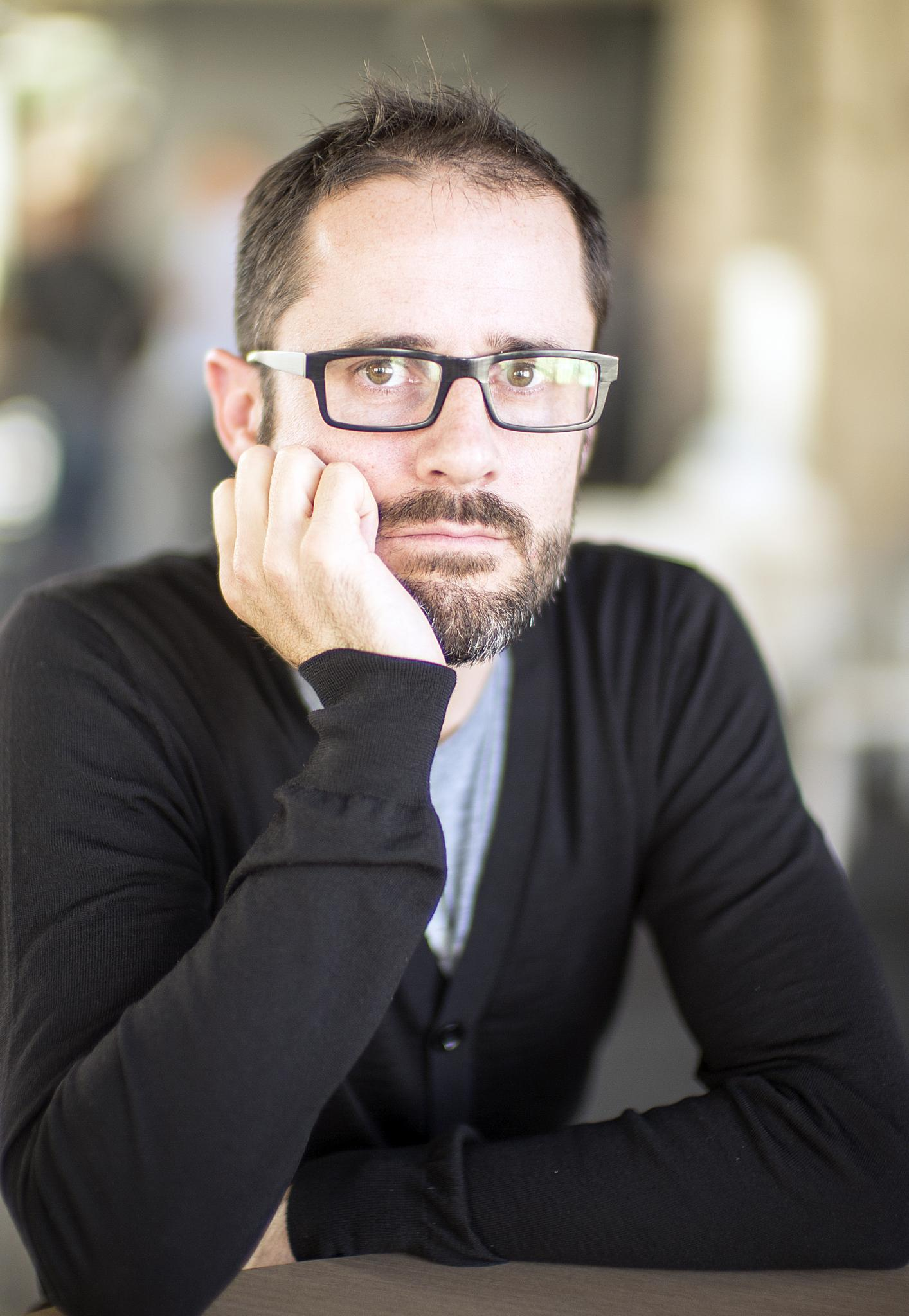
- Williams in 2014
- Born: Evan Clark Williams; March 31, 1972 (age 54); Clarks, Nebraska, U.S.
- Education: University of Nebraska–Lincoln (dropped out)
- Occupation: Internet entrepreneur
- Years active: 1993–present
- Known for: Blogger; Twitter; Medium
- Spouse: Sara Morishige Williams (divorced)
- Children: 2

Evan Clark Williams (born March 31, 1972) is an American internet entrepreneur. He is a co-founder of Twitter, and was its CEO from 2008 to 2010, and a member of its board from 2007 to 2019. He founded Blogger and Medium. In 2014, he co-founded the venture capital firm Obvious Ventures. As of May 2025, his net worth is estimated at US$2 billion, according to Forbes.

== Early life and education ==
Williams was born in Clarks, Nebraska, as the third child of Laurie Howe and Monte Williams. He grew up on a farm in Clarks, where he assisted with crop irrigation during the summers. He attended the University of Nebraska–Lincoln for a year and a half, where he joined FarmHouse fraternity, then left the school to pursue his career.

== Career ==
=== Early career ===
After departing from college, Williams took on various technology jobs and start-up firms in Key West, Florida, and in Dallas and Austin, Texas, before returning to his family farm in Nebraska. In 1996 Williams moved to Sebastopol, California, in Sonoma County to work for the technology publishing company O'Reilly Media. He started at O'Reilly in a marketing position, later becoming an independent contractor writing computer code, which led to freelance opportunities with companies including Intel and Hewlett-Packard. While working at O'Reilly, he also started a website called EvHead.com, where he first began blogging about his thoughts.

=== Pyra Labs and Blogger ===
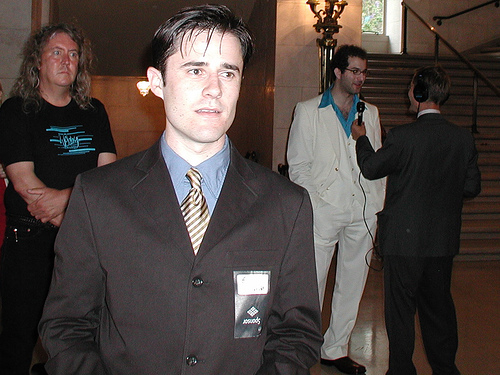
Williams at Webby Awards in 2001

Williams and Meg Hourihan co-founded Pyra Labs to make project management software. A note-taking feature spun off as Blogger, one of the first web applications for creating and managing weblogs. Williams coined the term "blogger" and was instrumental in the popularization of the term "blog". Pyra survived the departure of Hourihan and other employees, and was later acquired by Google on February 13, 2003.

In 2003, Williams was named to the MIT Technology Review TR100 as one of the top 100 innovators in the world under the age of 35. In 2004, he was named one of PC Magazine's "People of the Year", along with Hourihan and Paul Bausch, for their work on Blogger.

=== Odeo and Obvious Corporation ===
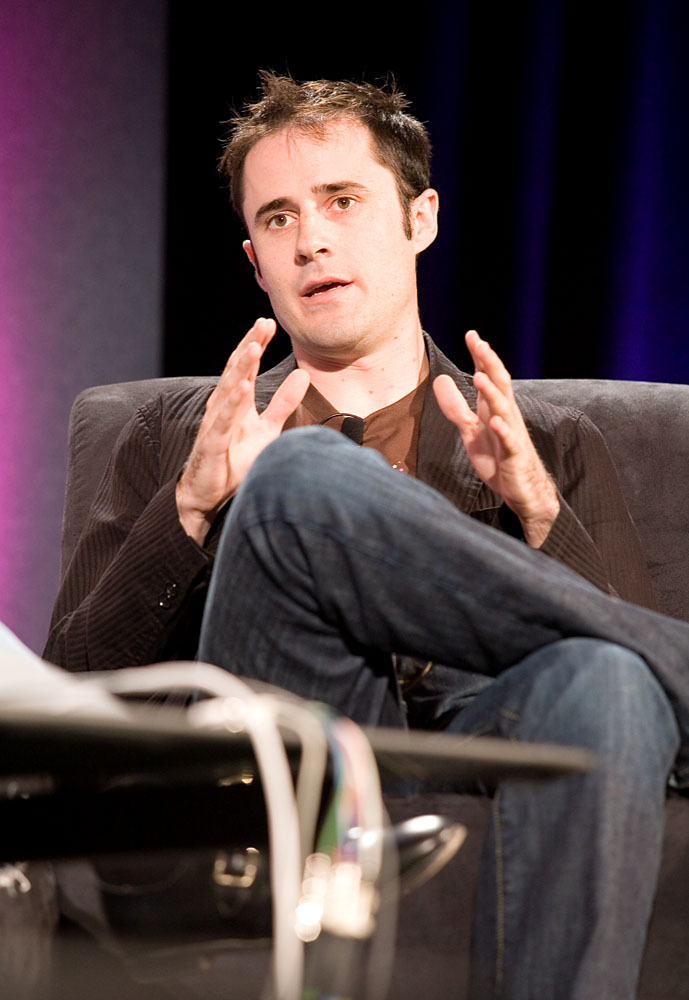
Williams at Web 2.0 Summit in 2005

Williams officially left Google on October 8, 2004, to co-found Odeo, a podcast company. In late 2006, Williams co-founded Obvious Corporation with Biz Stone and other former Odeo employees, to acquire all previous properties from Odeo's former backers. In April 2007, Odeo was acquired by Sonic Mountain.

=== Twitter ===
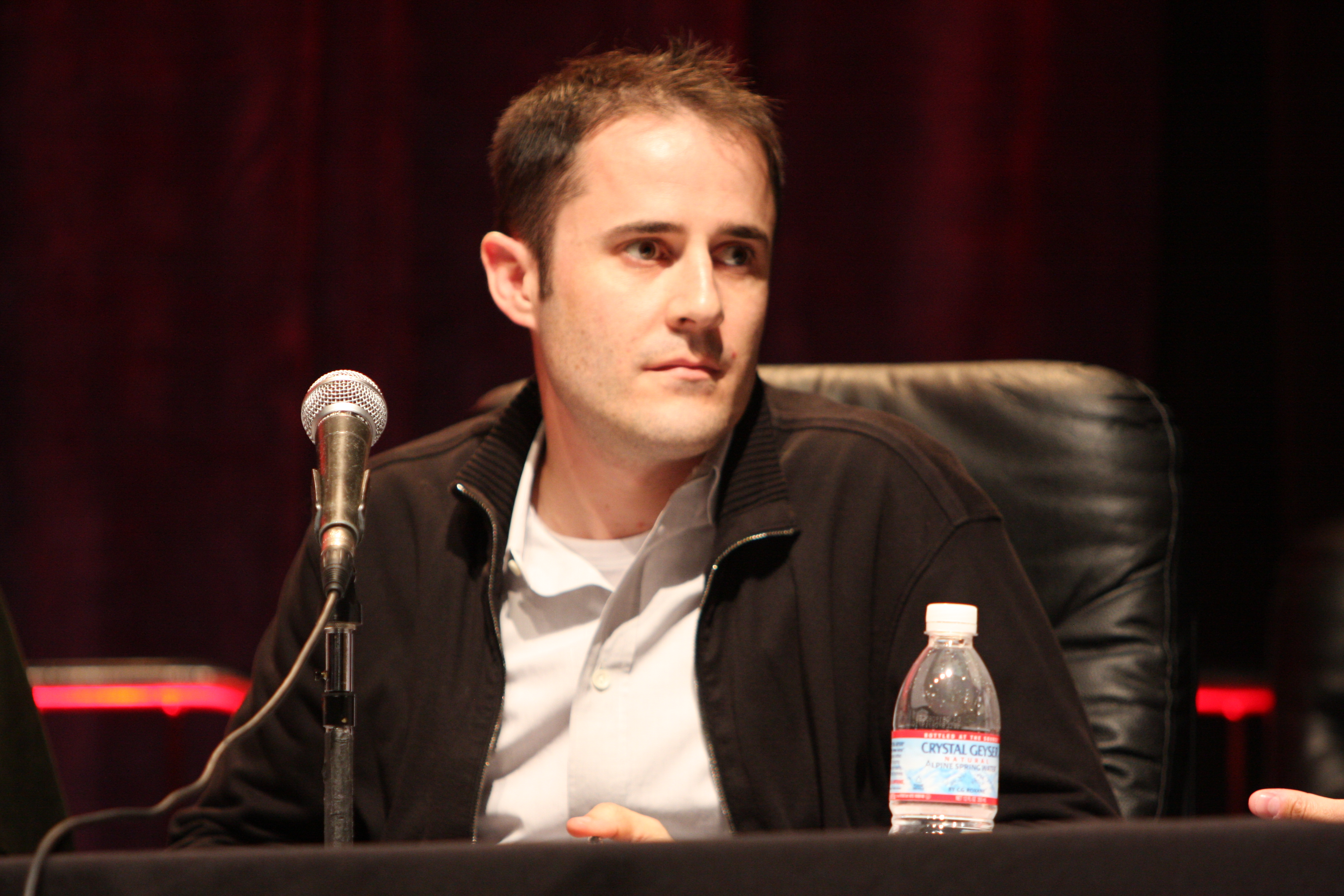
Williams at TechCrunch50 in 2008

Among Obvious Corporation's projects was Twitter, a popular, free social networking and micro-blogging service. Twitter was spun out as a new company in April 2007, with Williams as co-founder, board member, and investor. In October 2008, Williams became CEO of Twitter, succeeding Jack Dorsey, who became chairman of the board.

By February 2009, Compete.com ranked Twitter the third most-used social network, based on their count of 6 million unique monthly visitors and 55 million monthly visits.

In October 2010, Williams stepped down from the CEO position, explaining that he would be "completely focused on product strategy," and appointed Dick Costolo as his replacement.

Following the announcement of Twitter's initial public offering (IPO) in 2013, the company was valued at between US$14 billion and US$20 billion.

On April 6, 2017, an article announced Williams would sell 30 percent of his stock in Twitter, for "personal reasons."

In February 2019, Williams stepped down from his role as a board member of Twitter.

=== Medium ===
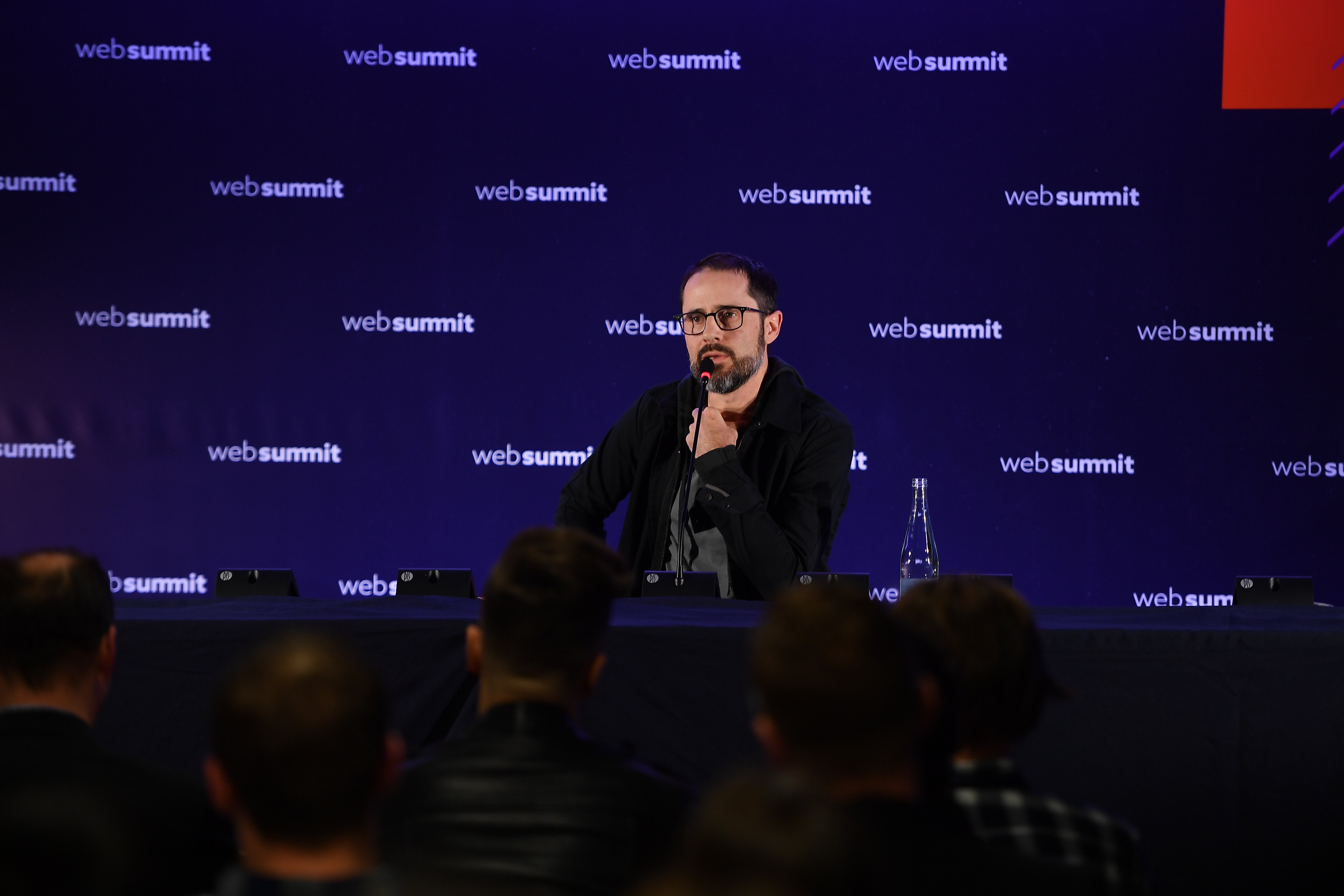
Williams speaking at 2018 Web Summit

On September 25, 2012, Williams created the publishing platform Medium. Initially, it was available only to early adopters, but was opened to the public in 2013.

On April 5, 2013, Williams and Stone announced that they would be unwinding Obvious Corporation as they focused on individual startups.

On July 12, 2022, it was announced Williams would step down as Medium's CEO and become the chairman of the board.

=== Obvious Ventures ===
In 2014, Williams co-founded the venture capital firm Obvious Ventures with James Joaquin and Vishal Vasishth. The firm is focused on companies they believe can make a positive change in the world. Since its inception the fund has raised about $585 million—$123 million in its first round, $191 million in its second and $271 million in its latest round. In 2024, Williams announced his new company, Mozi, which is a private social network he co-founded with entrepreneur Molly DeWolf Swenson. Mozi has raised $6M from investors including Obvious Ventures, WndrCo and BBG Ventures.

== Personal life ==
Williams lives in the San Francisco area with his wife, Sara, with whom he has two children. He is a vegetarian, and has invested – through the Obvious Corporation – in a plant-based meat alternative, Beyond Meat.

== Views ==
Williams has been quoted as having a philosophy that it is important to conserve time, do fewer things, and to avoid distractions.

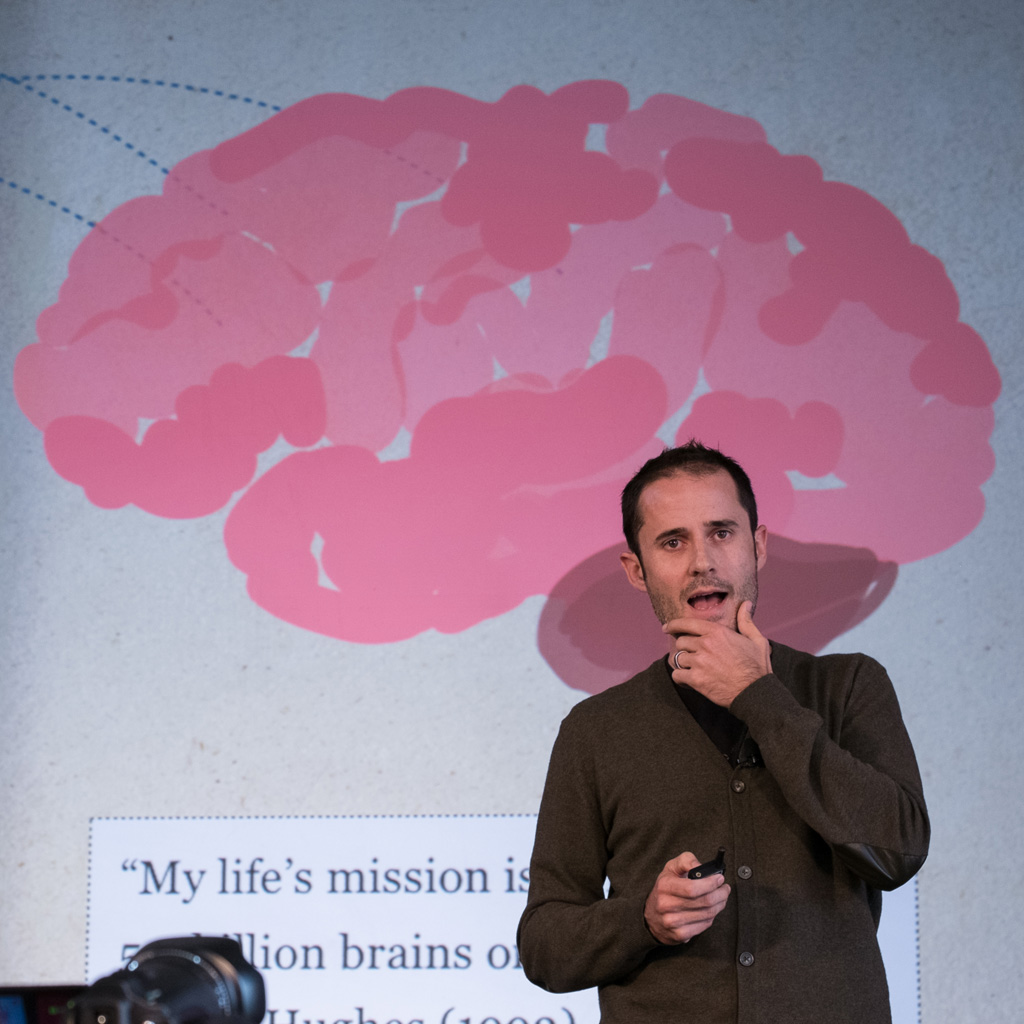
Williams speaking at XOXO Festival in 2013

Williams presented at the 2013 XOXO Festival in Portland, Oregon, and explained his understanding of internet commerce. During his XOXO session, Williams also likened the internet to "a lot of other major technological revolutions that have taken place in the history of the world," such as agriculture, and asserted that the internet is not a utopia.

After President Donald Trump credited his election win to the use of Twitter, Evan Williams stated that if true, he was sorry. He also said that the internet is "obviously broken because it rewards extremes". Williams told the Associated Press that he was wrong to think that an open platform where people could speak freely would make the world a better place. His musings about future business objectives include considerations about the effect of the internet upon society.

Business positions
Preceded by Jack Dorsey	Twitter CEO; 2008–2010	Succeeded by Dick Costolo
