= MetaFilter =

General-interest community weblog

- Website type: Community Weblog
- Owner: MetaFilter LLC
- Creator: Matthew Haughey
- Key people: Jessamyn West
- Website: www.metafilter.com
- Registration: Required to contribute
- Users: 47,691 active users
- Launched: July 14, 1999; 27 years ago
- Current status: Active

MetaFilter, known as MeFi to its members, is a general-interest community weblog, founded in 1999 and based in the United States, featuring links to content that users have discovered on the web. Since 2003, it has included the popular question-and-answer subsite Ask MetaFilter. The site has seven paid staff members as of August 2025. MetaFilter has about 47,691 active members as of May 2024.

== Community ==
From its early beginnings as a small community of webloggers who traded links, the weblog now enjoys international popularity. Members are permitted to make one post to the front page per day, which must feature at least one link. Members may then comment on these posts.

Although membership was initially free and unrestricted, growing membership forced frequent extended closures of new-member signup. On November 18, 2004, Haughey reopened signups, but with a US$5 life-time membership fee. According to Time magazine in 2009, this fee had kept the site "remarkably free of trolls, griefers and other anonymous jerks", yielding a "public-spirited flavor of a small town or good university". Although the number of registrations has topped 100,000, a design flaw in the counting process means that it counts users who abandoned the signup process mid-way; the actual number of posters is smaller, at around 38,700 as of October 2008.

MetaFilter has developed a fairly stable community with a variety of in-jokes. Members regularly gather for meetups in cities around the world, and there are numerous websites with strong connections to MetaFilter members and subgroups, including MetaChat and MonkeyFilter, the latter getting its start during the period when MetaFilter memberships were closed. Readers can mark other users' comments as a favorite, and commenters derive pride from how many times they have been "favorited".

== History ==
MetaFilter was founded by Matthew Haughey in 1999. Haughey wrote the software for the site himself, using Macromedia ColdFusion and Microsoft SQL Server. The earliest Front Page Post (FPP), concerning cats in scanners and the resulting pictures, debuted on July 14, 1999.

MetaFilter was included in Time's 50 Best Websites 2009 feature.

At SXSW 2011, Haughey gave a talk in which he noted that MetaFilter had about 125,000 user accounts, of which 12,000 are active.

In November 2012, MetaFilter experienced a huge drop of traffic due to the Google Panda search update; specifically, the Ask MetaFilter page lost 40% of its traffic. This made MetaFilter overnight lose money and led to the letting go of multiple paid moderators.

In July 2017, the ownership of MetaFilter was transferred from Matthew Haughey to long-time moderator Josh Millard.

In June 2018 the site was losing US$8,000 per month but rebounded with new sources of ad revenue and increased member contributions.

In May 2022, the ownership of MetaFilter was transferred to Jessamyn West, who had been MetaFilter's first volunteer and first employee. Additionally, a Steering Committee of community members was proposed in March and elected in August. In December 2024, the site started the transition to becoming a non-profit and West donated her interest in the site to a new entity named the MetaFilter Community Foundation.

== Content ==
MetaFilter's name derives from the idea that weblogs "filter" the "best of the web", and MetaFilter posts would be the best of the best. Posters are presumed responsible for selecting only the most interesting or novel websites to link, and users' reputations are largely determined by overall posting quality. Half-baked posts, self-promotion, open-ended questions, and other fare common on other community sites and internet forums are strongly discouraged at MetaFilter. Posts must contain a link, and the site linked must be of high quality.

=== Best of the Web ===
MetaFilter posts include a variety of content. Online art, award-winning web design, photography galleries, and the like fit into a cool site of the day theme. Flash games and funny online movies also appear. Net and blog culture discussions also percolate through MetaFilter, reflecting its early connections with Blogger, but this is becoming less common as membership expands.

=== NewsFilter ===
Open posting permits less rigorous items as well. The derisive term for this on MetaFilter is NewsFilter (or similar -Filter names for specific news topics, e.g. IraqFilter). Nevertheless, it is accepted that some discussion of current events and politics in particular is inevitable, and a certain level is tolerated. If more than one post is made about a news topic, the extras are often deleted and discussion is redirected to the "canonical" post about the topic, usually the first one made. Important news items or political arguments can turn into very long discussions, such as 9/11 (2001), the London Bombings (2005), and Hurricane Katrina (2005)—which generated over 80 front page posts in about a week. The first example of this was arguably the 2001 Nisqually earthquake.

=== Investigations ===
Because MetaFilter bans "selflinks" or posts by a person with a significant conflict of interest, posts tend to be closely scrutinized. Members of the site also have, several times, worked closely together to root out deception and scams. In May 2001, MetaFilter played a key role in uncovering the Kaycee Nicole hoax, in which a woman made up a fake online persona of a teenage daughter who was dying of cancer, fooling many bloggers and garnering sympathy and gifts. In October 2004, MetaFilter members uncovered the identities of the writers of the hoax Website Nick Nolte's Diary. An astroturfing campaign by Holden Karnofsky, the co-founder of the online charity GiveWell, was detected in January 2008 through a sockpuppet posting to Ask MetaFilter, leading to Karnofsky's resignation. In 2009, a user detected photoshopping by photographer Edgar Martins in a New York Times Magazine gallery, which was subsequently withdrawn.

== Moderation ==
One of MetaFilter's founding tenets and an important factor in the "feel" of the site is the idea that the bulk of moderation is done through social norms and peer pressure, referred to as "self-policing" in a site tagline. Posts that do not meet the community's standards for quality are often "called out" to MetaTalk, an administrative area of the site, and interested members discuss how the post could have been improved, or, in some cases, ruthlessly mock the offender. (The community occasionally concludes, after discussion, that the call-out was unwarranted.) Moderators may step in and temporarily suspend an offending user's account, but this is rare; permanent bans are rarer still, and are generally reserved for spammers and other egregious abusers of the site. MetaTalk also sees particularly excellent posts called out for praise, and moderators regularly feature superlative contributions on the main page's sidebar.

For the site's first few years, this practice of self-policing ensured a high level of quality and allowed Haughey to use a light touch in moderating the site; however, as the community has grown, Haughey has expanded the site's staff and taken a more active role. In 2004, Jessamyn West began assisting him with moderation duties; in 2007, user Josh Millard ("cortex") was appointed as an additional moderator. In 2008, London user Ricardo Vacapinta assumed off-hours moderator duties, and in April 2011 Jeremy Preacher (restless_nomad) came on to keep an eye on things over the weekend. A flagging feature allows members to call moderator attention to substandard, offensive, or outstanding posts, allowing users continued input towards shaping the site while quickly alerting site staff to potential trouble spots.

On May 19, 2014, Haughey announced that effective June 1, 2014, moderators West, LobsterMitten and goodnewsfortheinsane would be laid off from their positions due to a sudden and unexpected slump in traffic caused by updates to Google's Panda search algorithm, which reduced ad revenue generated by Ask MetaFilter by more than 40%.

== Subsites ==
As mentioned under Moderation, the administrative area known as MetaTalk, or MeTa for short, allows for meta-discussion of the community, including bug reports, feature requests, and "self-policing".

In 2003, Ask MetaFilter was launched. This forum allows members to post questions to the community, without the link requirement. AskMe quickly grew to a strong side community with slightly different etiquette requirements and many daily threads that cover a broad spectrum of topics. Users are limited to asking one question per week and are allowed to ask questions anonymously.

At the end of 2005, MetaFilter Projects was launched. This area of the site is for members to announce web projects they have been working on—the one place on the site where so-called "self-linking" is permitted. Members can vote on projects, and often post interesting projects to the main site following the same guidelines as any other post.

In 2006, MetaFilter Music launched. This area of the site allows users to upload their own musical creations, which others can listen to directly on the website, along with playlist and favorites features.

Later on August 24, 2006, MetaFilter Jobs was added. This section was created for members to post job openings.

In 2007, MetaFilter launched a podcast, which lives at the Podcast subsite.

in June 2010, the IRL subsite was launched as a place to share community meetups and other events.

In 2014, FanFare was created to give the community a place to discuss entertainment media such as TV shows, Movies, Podcasts, Books, and Special Events.
