= Star Wars Kid =

Viral video and Internet meme

- A screenshot from the video
- Starring: Ghyslain Raza
- Release date: April 2003
- Running time: 1:48
- Country: Canada

Star Wars Kid is a viral video made in 2002 by Ghyslain Raza in which he wields a golf ball retriever in imitation of Darth Maul's lightsaber moves from the film Star Wars: Episode I – The Phantom Menace. At the time, Raza was a 14-year-old high school student from Trois-Rivières, Quebec, Canada. He had not intended for the video to become public, but its subsequent release led to ridicule, during which Raza chose to distance himself from the video. Raza has since affirmed his identity and has used the video to help to speak on the effects of bullying and harassment.

== History ==
In November 2002, Raza made a video of himself swinging a golf ball retriever around as a mock weapon. The video was filmed at his high school studio, and he accidentally left the tape in a basement. It was taped over a portion of a basketball game (as seen extremely briefly at the end of the clip). The video was discovered by a schoolmate, whose friend created a computer file from the video tape. The video was distributed among the school's students. A student uploaded it to the Internet with the title Jackass_starwars_funny.wmv. The video eventually became a viral Internet meme through P2P services. According to court transcripts, the video first appeared on the Internet on the evening of April 14, 2003. One of those that first uploaded the video was blogger Andy Baio who was credited with naming the video "Star Wars Kid".

Raza states he was a victim of cyberbullying, as online commenters responded with critical or bullying messages. In a 2013 interview, Raza states, "What I saw was mean. It was violent. People were telling me to commit suicide." Among the comments online, one commenter called him "a pox on humanity." He was bullied in person at his school, and he left the campus to pursue private tutoring. He said he lost friends because of the ordeal. He returned to high school for his senior year and went on to finish schooling as a law graduate.

=== Lawsuit ===
In July 2003, Raza's family filed a CA$250,000 lawsuit against the families of four of his schoolmates. The lawsuit stated in part that he "had to endure, and still endures today, harassment and derision from his high-school mates and the public at large" and "will be under psychiatric care for an indefinite amount of time". Legal proceedings against one family were quickly dropped. The lawsuit had been scheduled to begin trial on April 10, 2006, but on April 7, Raza and his parents reached an out-of-court settlement with the defendants.

=== Aftermath ===
Until May 2013, Raza had taken steps to avoid connecting himself with the video, although his identity was discovered through other means. Raza recounted to L'actualité that he had received numerous invitations from various late night and talk shows, but he assumed they only wanted to turn him into a "circus act".

In the 10 years following the propagation of the meme, Raza had become the president of Patrimoine de Trois-Rivières heritage society. Raza decided to come forward to assert his identity as the Star Wars Kid to help bring to light the type of bullying and negative attention that children might receive in similar incidents with the rise of social media.

In 2022, Raza participated in the documentary Star Wars Kid: The Rise of the Digital Shadows, released by the National Film Board of Canada. As part of the footage, Baio apologized to Raza for uploading the video, having no idea of the impact it would have, and saying "I have enormous regret about posting the video." Raza accepted the apology, recognizing at the time Baio was an empathetic person who made a bad judgement call.

== Reception ==
The leaked video attracted a number of fans. A petition was started by fans to include Raza in Star Wars: Episode III – Revenge of the Sith. The petition reached more than 140,000 signatures, but he was not offered a cameo appearance.

Other fans set up a fundraiser for Raza to show support and as a token of appreciation, garnering donations from more than 400 people online.

Several fans related to Raza. "That's why his video [became] so popular: It was funny and awkward but ultimately we connected to him. That made us feel more comfortable with our own awkwardness and dreams of being a Jedi," said one group of Star Wars enthusiasts. A fan stated in a 2003 USA Today article, "Contrary to popular belief, I think it is not the Jedi kid's awkwardness that keeps him in people's hearts but his undeniable enthusiasm for what he is doing."

=== Critical reception ===
In 2005, CNET listed the Star Wars Kid as #8 on its Top 10 Web Fads list. In 2007, the G4 TV show Attack of the Show rated it the number 1 viral video of all time. It was ranked #2 on VH1's "Top 40 Internet Celebrities", right behind Gary Brolsma (The Numa Numa Guy). The case raised privacy issues and was extensively reported in mainstream news media worldwide.

=== Legacy ===
An edited version of the video was created with Star Wars music, texts, and lightsaber lights and sounds. The Viral Factory estimated that by November 27, 2006, the video had been viewed over 900 million times.

== In popular culture ==
The video and its subsequent popularity spawned many spoofs and references on various television programs, including episodes of American Dad! episode "All About Steve"; George Michael parodies the video in multiple episodes of Arrested Development, beginning with "The Immaculate Election"; Ned's Declassified School Survival Guide; Cory in the House; The Office episode "Finale"; and the South Park episode "Canada on Strike". The character of Henchman 21 in The Venture Bros. was originally created as a Star Wars Kid reference, and was eventually promoted to main cast.

In 2006, comedian Stephen Colbert initiated a contest, the Green Screen Challenge. He presented a video of himself standing in front of a green screen, using a toy lightsaber to dramatically fight off imaginary foes in the fashion of the Star Wars Kid. Viewers were then invited to edit and enhance it in their own way. Viewers would then send their own videos into the show, on which the best would be featured. The contest culminated with an appearance by Star Wars creator George Lucas, who presented his elaborate version of the video, enhanced by Industrial Light and Magic.

In "Weird Al" Yankovic's music video for "White and Nerdy" Yankovic is seen at one point as Star Wars Kid, flailing a lightsaber. In Kevin Smith's movie Tusk the main character (portrayed by Justin Long) goes to Canada to try to meet Kill Bill Kid, a spoof of the Star Wars Kid. In the episode "The Sky Guy" of the animated series Wander Over Yonder, the wizard character Neckbeard makes moves with a bo staff similarly to the Star Wars Kid.

In the episode "The Joy" of the animated series The Amazing World of Gumball, the character Principal Brown videotapes himself in his office swinging a mop around, spoofing the Star Wars Kid—even telling another character to not let the tape get on the Internet because "people's lives have been ruined by things like that", referencing the subsequent bullying.

The Star Wars Kid is featured as an easter egg in the Boston and Triangle level of Tony Hawk's Underground 2 and is also an unlockable Skater that is unlocked by beating Story mode on easy. In Boston upon finding him after jumping up into an apartment in the Boston level, he can be seen showing off his Jedi moves. In Triangle he is seen dancing on a table in front of multiple aliens.

== See also ==
- List of Internet phenomena
- Cringe culture
