= XOXO (festival) =

Annual art and technology festival and conference in Portland, Oregon

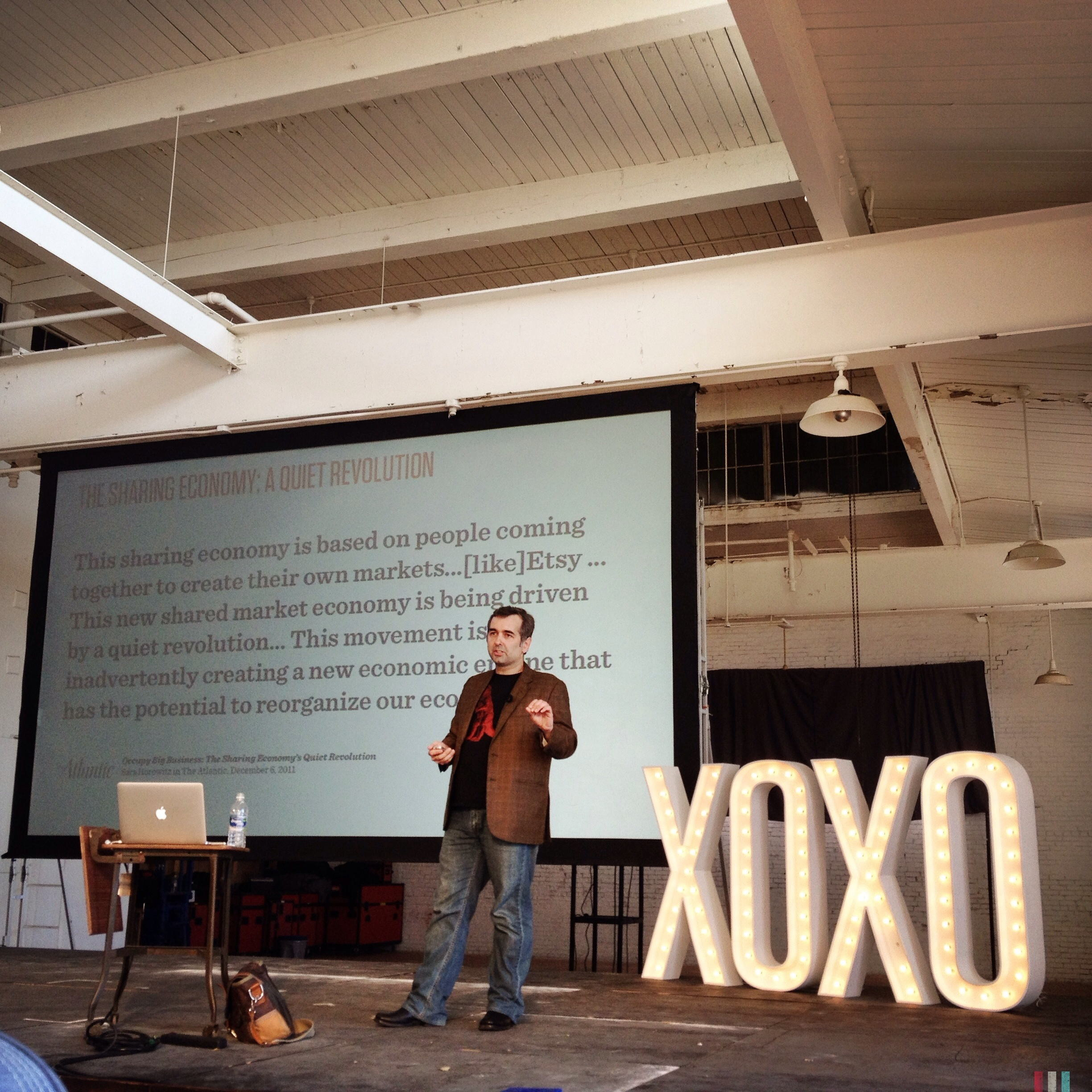
- One of the speakers at XOXO 2012, Chad Dickerson of Etsy
- Status: Defunct
- Genre: Art, technology
- Frequency: Annually
- Location: Portland, Oregon
- Country: United States
- Years active: 2012–2024
- Inaugurated: 2012
- Founder: Andy Baio; Andy McMillan
- Most recent: August 24, 2024
- Website: xoxofest.com

XOXO was an annual festival and conference held in Portland, Oregon, that described itself as "an experimental festival for independent artists who live and work online". XOXO was founded in 2012 by Andy Baio and Andy McMillan with funding from prepaid tickets and other contributions via Kickstarter. In 2016, technology website The Verge called it "the internet's best festival".

XOXO was held every year from 2012 to 2019 except for 2017. It was not held between 2020 and 2023, as a result of the COVID-19 pandemic. The final festival was held in 2024.

== History ==
XOXO was an annual festival and conference that focused on indie creators and artists working on the web. Except for a larger conference in 2018, the conference was limited to around 1,000 attendees, and organizers introduced an application and lottery system to promote diversity and discourage attendees who were focused on marketing to other attendees. Speakers at the festivals were most often independent creators, and the festival eschewed the corporate nature of other conferences and festivals centered around technology. Talks at the first two events generally reflected enthusiasm around being an indie creator, while later events featured more reflection on the challenges of being an independent artist, criticism of the web and the broader technology industry, and focus on social justice and activism.

=== 2012 ===
The inaugural event was held in Portland's Yale Union Laundry Building in September 2012 with approximately 400 participants. That year's event was funded on Kickstarter, raising $175,000.

Associated events included live music, film screenings, an arcade of independently produced video games, a market, and food trucks. News media and bloggers noted an "impressive list of speakers" and an "intimate tone" missing from other technology-focused conferences. Ruth Brown wrote "the audience was overwhelmingly white, male, middle class and educated."

=== 2013 ===
The festival returned to the Yale Union Laundry Building with speakers, workshops, films, music shows, game events, and a market. Baio described it as being "about artists and hackers and makers that are using the internet to make a living doing what they love independently without sacrificing creative or financial control". To handle increased interest while remaining small (500 conference tickets and 200 "fringe event" tickets), it had an application process with questions intended to filter out people who wanted to market to attendees.

Portland Monthly compared the event to the larger South by Southwest festival, quoting Matthew Haughey saying SXSW speakers are "in the business of selling technologies" and XOXO speakers are "creating things". Rachel Edidin described the event in Wired as a "creative incubator" that is "painfully earnest, unflaggingly positive", and criticized the event for high ticket costs that introduced barriers to access that mirrored some of the issues it sought to resist.

=== 2014 ===
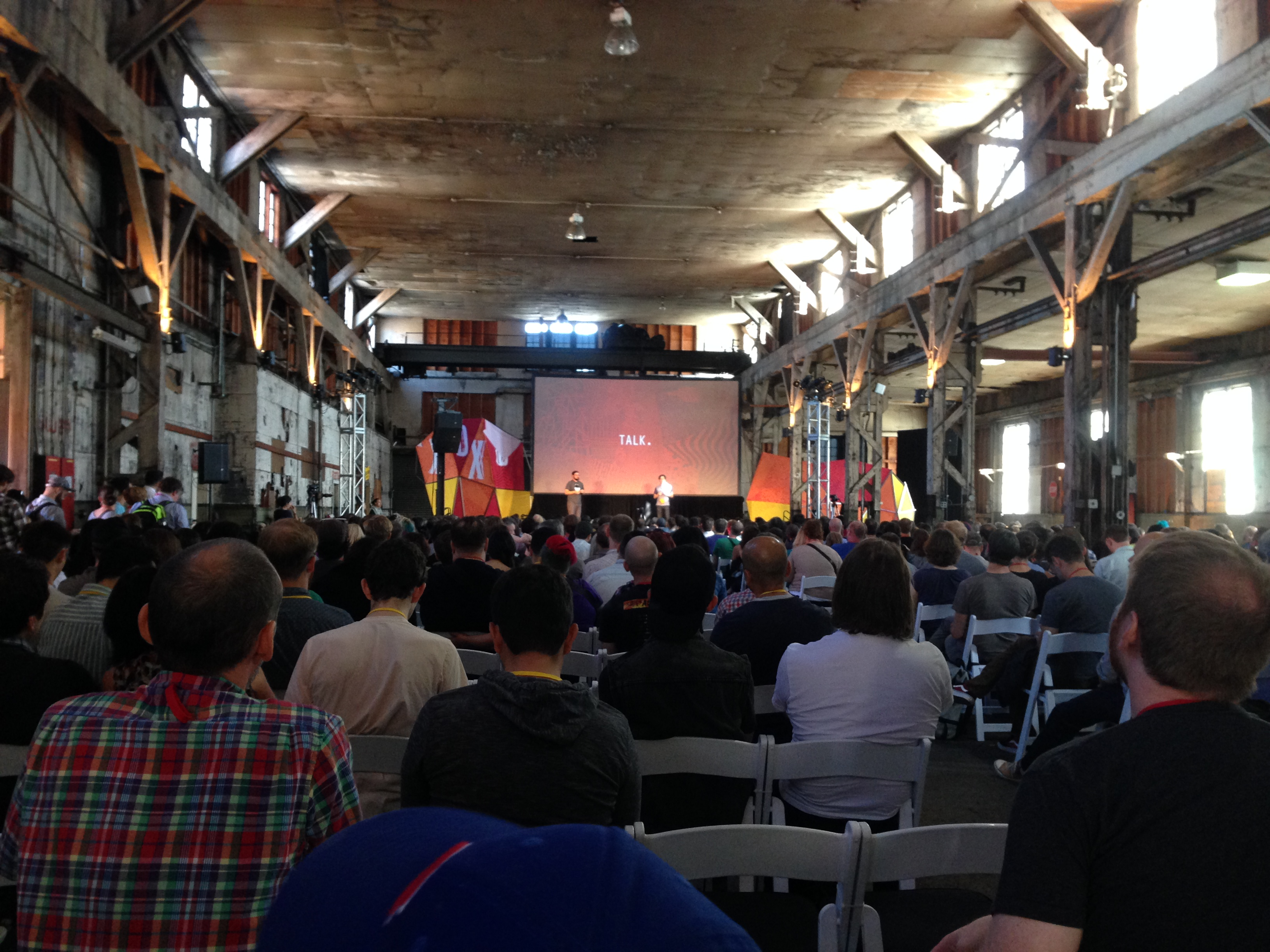
XOXO 2014 inside The Redd

XOXO 2014 was held at The Redd, a former ironworks facility in an industrial area of Portland. Conference speakers included feminist media critic Anita Sarkeesian, data visualization designer Rachel Binx, software engineer Edna Piranha, Welcome to Night Vale creator Joseph Fink, Lifehacker founder Gina Trapani, lexicographer Erin McKean, and technologist Paul Ford. Sarkeesian's appearance was met with controversy from Gamergate supporters, with one protester trespassing the festival grounds and Portland Police being called to the festival. Casey Newton wrote in The Verge about the festival's focus on freelance and indie artists: "this is likely to be the only conference where you see tech CEOs listening to a freelance jewelry designer talk about her struggles paying the rent." Attendance was capped at 1,000 people, and attendees were selected through an application and lottery process that aimed to increase diversity.

=== 2015 ===
XOXO 2015 was held at the Revolution Hall in Portland, Oregon. Baio and McMillan aimed to increase the number of talks focusing on the challenges of being an independent creator, and to offer more criticism than previous years. They also capped attendance at 750 people. Speakers included video game developer Zoe Quinn, Anita Sarkeesian, and web technologist Eric A. Meyer. Engadget wrote many talks were "emotionally driven... centered around the difficult issues of being independent." The Guardian attributed the festival's popularity to "its gentleness, its emotive undertone and thoughtful curation, but also its commitment to supporting individual artists over businesses and corporates."

In 2015, the festival adopted the chat software Slack, and by the time of the conference the XOXO Slack instance had more than 150 channels. The Verge later credited XOXO for bringing Slack into the mainstream.

=== 2016 ===
XOXO 2016 was also held at the Revolution Hall and was attended by over 1,200 attendees. Speakers included musician Neil Cicierega, journalist Sarah Jeong, satirist Jenn Schiffer, and Itch.io founder Leaf Corcoran. The Verge called it "the internet's best festival," and highlighted its attention to detail, focus on diversity, and curation. A follow-up article featured highlights and discoveries from the festival lineup. Organizers announced that they would not be hosting an event the following year, instead choosing to focus on the Outpost workspace they had founded in mid-2015.

=== 2018 ===
After a one-year hiatus in 2017, the sixth XOXO was held on September 6–9, 2018 at a new venue, Veterans Memorial Coliseum. Nearly twice the size of past years, over 2,300 attendees attended XOXO 2018.

The festival opened with a keynote from comedian Cameron Esposito about the production of her "Rape Jokes" standup special. Speakers included author John Hodgman, author Ijeoma Oluo, rapper and producer Open Mike Eagle, and Anita Sarkeesian. The festival closed with an unannounced concert by Lizzo on the festival's main stage, who surprised attendees after the show by performing karaoke in the Blue Ox Bar, a dedicated pop-up dive bar created for the event. Other on-site installations included a secret speakeasy, accessible only by solving a series of puzzles accessible via telephone booths around the venue, and Dear Future Me, an interactive installation by illustrator Alice Lee inviting attendees to mail a postcard to their future selves. The festival also introduced an event called "Art+Code", which showcased quirky web-based art, and a comics night.

=== 2019 ===
After experimenting with a larger event in 2018, XOXO returned to its previous size and venue for its seventh year, with 1,200 attendees at Revolution Hall. Organizers cited the desire to return to a more comfortable, accessible, and intimate size.

=== 2020–2023 ===
The 2020–2023 XOXO festivals were canceled due to the COVID-19 pandemic. In an interview with Willamette Week in 2020, festival co-founder Andy Baio said that, due to uncertainty about the duration of the pandemic, "The last XOXO may have been the last one."

=== 2024 ===
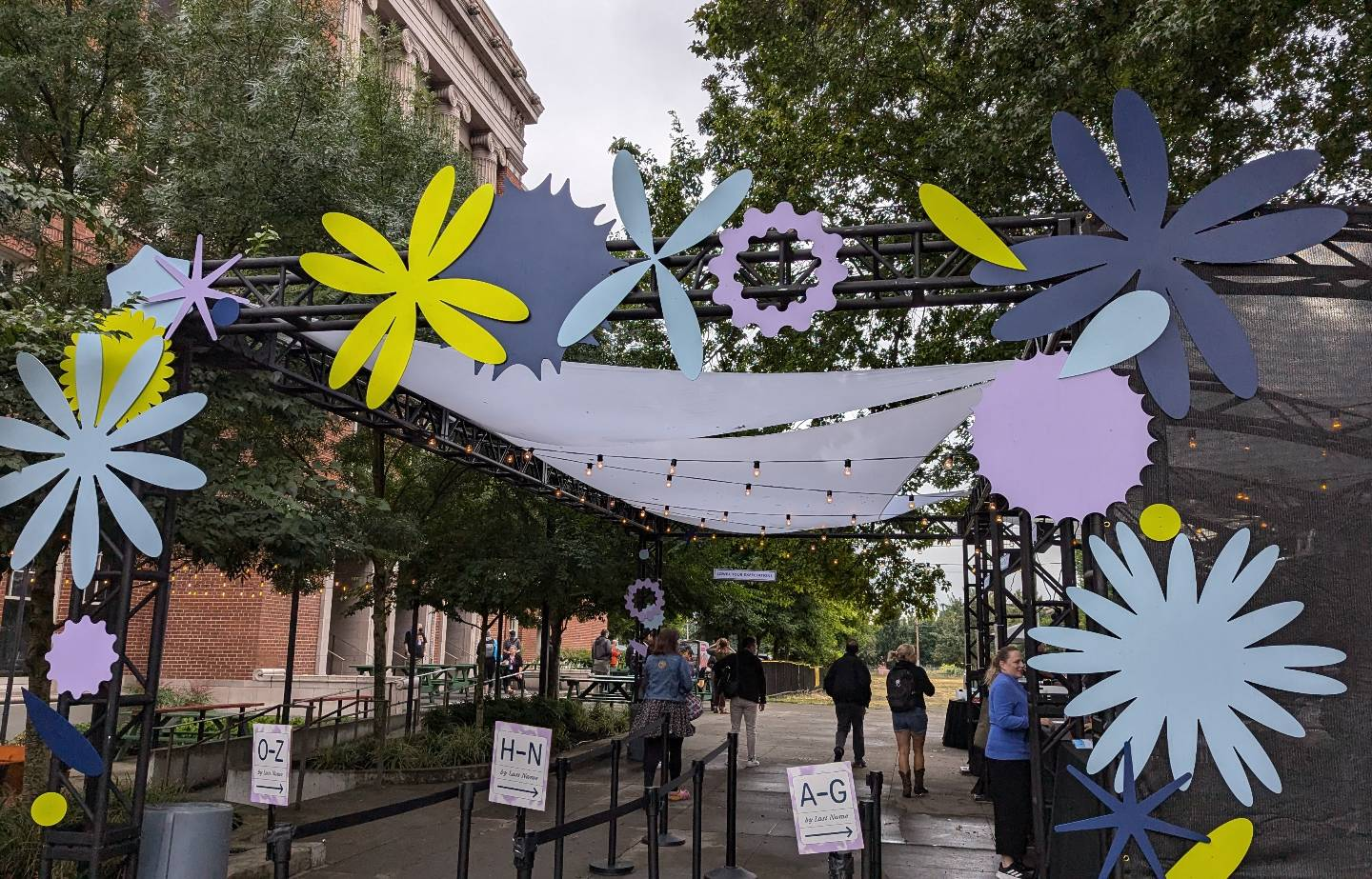
Entrance to the 2024 XOXO festival

In March 2024, the festival's organizers published a blog post announcing that the August 2024 XOXO festival would be the last. They explained that decreased sponsor budgets, independent artists' financial struggles, as well as the dangers of COVID-19 make XOXO unsustainable.

== Outpost ==
In June 2015, the organizers of XOXO announced they were opening a shared, pay-what-you-can workspace to "bring some of our favorite people and projects in indie art and tech under one roof" in a 13,000 square foot building in Portland's Central Eastside Industrial District. The Outpost was open from February 2016 until December 2016, when it closed citing rising rental costs.

== See also ==
- Culture of Portland, Oregon
