= Star Wars Kid: The Rise of the Digital Shadows =

- French: Dans l'ombre du Star Wars Kid
- Directed by: Mathieu Fournier
- Written by: Mathieu Fournier; Jonathan Trudel
- Produced by: Annie Bourdeau; Pierre-Mathieu Fortin
- Starring: Ghyslain Raza
- Cinematography: Alexandre Fréchette; Marc Warden
- Edited by: Carmen-Mélanie Pépin
- Production company: National Film Board of Canada
- Release date: March 30, 2022
- Running time: 80 minutes
- Country: Canada
- Language: French

Star Wars Kid: The Rise of the Digital Shadows (French: Dans l'ombre du Star Wars Kid) is a 2022 Canadian documentary film, directed by Mathieu Fournier. The film explores the concept of the digital shadow, or the traces of a person's past internet activity that can be recovered to follow them around for years or even decades later, through revisiting the story of Ghyslain Raza, a Canadian man who unwittingly became one of the first-ever viral videos as the "Star Wars Kid".

The film received a Canadian Screen Award nomination for Best Biography or Arts Documentary Program or Series at the 12th Canadian Screen Awards in 2024.
