= Matthew Haughey =

American programmer, web designer, and blogger

Matt Haughey
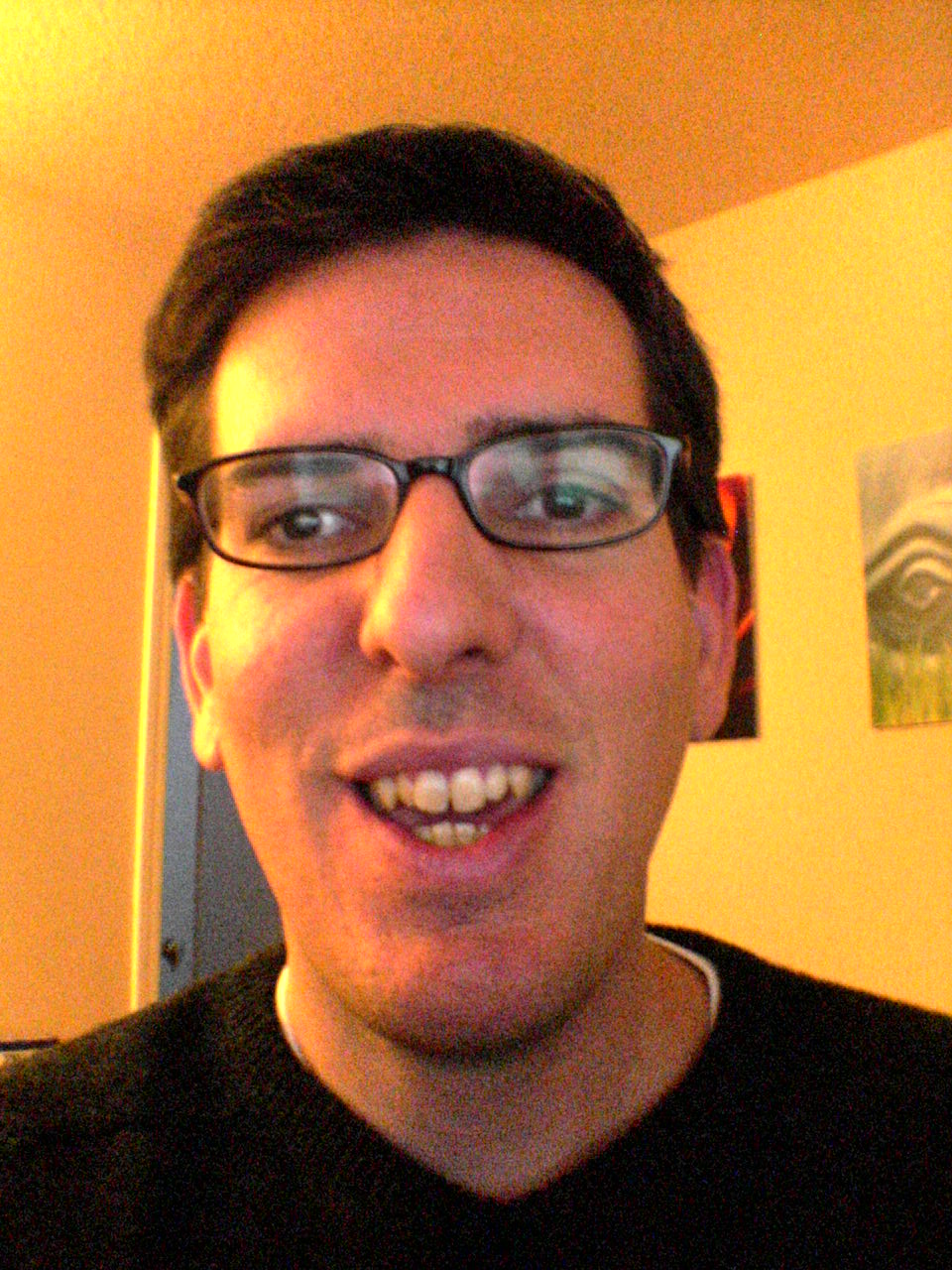
- Haughey self-portrait
- Born: October 10, 1972 (age 53); United States
- Other name: mathowie
- Education: University of California, Riverside (BS, MS)
- Occupations: Programmer, blogger
- Website: a.wholelottanothing.org

Matthew Haughey (born October 10, 1972) is an American programmer, web designer, and blogger. He is best known as the founder of the community weblog MetaFilter, where he is called mathowie.

== Life and career ==
Haughey grew up in Placentia, California, United States. He graduated from the University of California, Riverside with a B.S. and M.S. in environmental science.

Haughey designed his first website in 1995. From 1997 to 2000, he was a webmaster and programmer for Social Sciences Computing at UCLA. He moved to the San Francisco Bay area in 2000s, worked as an employee of Pyra Labs, and participated in the development of early versions of Blogger. In 2001, he worked briefly for KnowNow and Bitzi. Life led him to relocate to Portland, Oregon, where he served as creative director at Creative Commons from 2002 to 2005.

In 1999, Haughey launched MetaFilter, a community weblog and internet forum, which he programmed on his own using Macromedia ColdFusion and Microsoft SQL Server. In March 2015, he announced his stepping down from daily management of Metafilter and take on a new role as Senior Content Director at Slack. He left the primary management and operation duties of Metafilter to long-time moderator Josh Millard. In July 2017, the ownership was transferred from Metafilter to Millard.

Haughey was featured on the front cover of the May 2001 issue of Brill's Content, illustrating the cover story entitled "Human Portals". MetaFilter was a project he started when there were only "30 or so" blogs, and he felt that finding "one or two links a day" personally was not enough content. He concluded that a blog with four or five people could do better. He had to contribute many of the early posts until "a few hundred people showed up and we had something good". MetaFilter has since been described as "one of the web's most successful communities". Haughey credits the site's "strong sense of community" for its success, unlike websites that offer social incentives such as karma.

Haughey has a personal weblog called A Whole Lotta Nothing and a photoblog titled Ten Years of My Life, in which he records daily photographs, many of himself. Ten Years was named third-best photo blog by Forbes in 2004. On his personal blog, he was noted for starting an internet meme when he annotated Google Maps images of his hometown. He has helped build MetaFilter workalikes such as SportsFilter and helped instigate the5k.org.

Haughey has also ventured into niche blogging; his PVRBlog (personal video recorder blog), which he started in 2004, gained attention as the site that first published complaints over copyright protection on TiVo systems. It was also recognized as an early adopter of Google AdSense text advertising, which according to Haughey allowed him to make enough income to cover his mortgage. In December 2009, Haughey auctioned off PVRBlog on eBay. He had guessed that the site would sell for about $8,500. But after heavy bidding, it was eventually sold for $12,110 to brightfire.net of Austin, TX.

Haughey has been a technical editor of several programming books, and has also contributed chapters to non-technical books in topic areas such as blogging and online community. Since 2005, Haughey has written a number of pieces for The New York Times CIRCUITS section.

In April 2007, Haughey launched the blog Fortuito.us in order to share his thoughts about supporting himself and his family through online projects.

On November 12, 2009, Haughey posted to Twitter, "I passed out at home had a seizure, went to ER, did a cat scan and they found a growth. Awaiting surgery in the next week to remove it." Within hours, thousands of people responded with well wishes. Surgery was planned for the following day, but postponed at the last minute. On December 29, 2009, Haughey announced that hormone therapy had shrunk the tumor to less than 50% its original size, and that prospects looked good for the tumor to shrink until "nearly disappearing".

Haughey lives in McMinnville, Oregon, with his wife Kay and their daughter Fiona (who has also been the subject of a photoblog, Fiona.haughey.com).

== Publications ==
- Interviewed in Design for Community: The Art of Connecting Real People in Virtual Places, Waite Group Press (2001). ISBN 0-7357-1075-9
- Co-author, We Blog: Publishing Online with Weblogs, Wiley (2002). ISBN 0-7645-4962-6
- Co-author, Usability: The Site Speaks for Itself, Peer Information (2002). ISBN 1-904151-03-5.
- Co-author, We've Got Blog: How Weblogs Are Changing Our Culture, Perseus Books Group, 2002. ISBN 0-7382-0741-1
- Co-author, Hacking Movable Type (ExtremeTech), Wiley (2005). ISBN 0-7645-7499-X
