= Edgar Martins =

Portuguese photographer and author

Edgar Martins (born 1977) is a Portuguese photographer and author who lives and works in the United Kingdom.

== Life ==
Born in 1977 in Évora, Portugal, Martins grew up in Macau (China). He moved to the UK in 1996, where he completed an MA in Photography and Fine Arts at the Royal College of Art.

== Career ==
Martins's first monograph, Black Holes & Other Inconsistencies was awarded the RCA Society and Thames & Hudson Art Book Prize. A selection of images from this book were also awarded the inaugural Jerwood Photography Award in 2003.

Martins has since been widely published and exhibited: selected recent exhibitions include the 54th Venice biennale (Memory & Mobility, Macau China Pavilion, 2011); the Somerset House (Landmark: Fields of Photography, 2012), Museu Nacional de Arte Contemporânea, Museu do Chiado, Lisbon (Arte Portuguesa do Séc. XX 1850–2010, 2012), MOPA San Diego (Infinite Balance, 2011); The Wapping Project, London; Gallery of Photography, Dublin; Ffotogallery, Penarth and The New Art Gallery Walsall (This is not a House, 2012). His work is collected in museums, public, corporate and private collections, throughout the world, such as BES (Portugal), the Fundação Ilídio Pinho (Portugal), MACE (Portugal), The Victoria and Albert Museum (UK), The National Media Museum (UK), The Dallas Museum of Art (US,) The National Media Museum (UK), The Calouste Gulbenkian Foundation (Paris), The EDP Foundation (Portugal), amongst many others.

In 2009, Martins was shortlisted for Prix Pictet – Earth, along with artists such as Edward Burtynsky and Andreas Gursky. His series The Diminishing Present was subsequently included in the Prix Pictet exhibition which travelled to Thessaloniki Museum of Photography; The Empty Quarter in Dubai and Eindhoven University of Technology.

Martins was the recipient of the inaugural New York Photography Award (Fine Art Category) in May 2008. In 2011, Martins was nominated for the Prix Voies Off during the Voies Off/Arles Festival. Other awards include: Brighton Photo Biennale and Photobook Show 2012, Sony World Photography Awards 2009 (Second Prize), BES Photo Award 2009 (winner), ING Real Photography Award 2008 (shortlist), AOP Awards 2008 (Winner, Contemporary Landscape and Cityscape category), Arles and Photo Espanã Book Awards 2008 (shortlist).

In a June 2006 article, The Art Newspaper compared the work of Gregory Crewdson and Martins, stating that Martins "seeks fresh horizons to develop a philosophical, quasi-scientific investigation, carried forward on several different fronts" and that "whereas Crewdson's books puts enormous effort into disguising the artificiality of what are in essence almost operatic productions, Martins' sensibility just keeps it simple: the overall concept being photography for photography's sake."

== Digital alteration controversy ==
Martins has made a selling point of how he avoids post-production. For example, in an interview with ARTmostfierce, he states:

When I photograph I don’t do any post production to the images, either in the darkroom or digitally, because it erodes the process. So I respect the essence of these spaces.

In the Sunday 5 July 2009, edition of the New York Times Magazine, Martins published an expanded photo essay entitled "Ruins of the Second Gilded Age". On 7 July, commenters on community weblog MetaFilter pointed out that at least some of the images were digitally altered, which was not consistent with the text accompanying the photo essay which claimed that the photos were obtained with 'long exposures but without digital manipulation'. The essay has since been removed from the website, replaced with a statement that "[e]ditors later confronted the photographer and determined that most of the images did not wholly reflect the reality they purported to show".

The analysis further went on to show that images purportedly showing symmetry in Mr. Martin's other exhibits were created by mirroring half of a photograph and adding small, asymmetrical details to the mirrored half. Examples can be seen in several images from Martin's work "The Diminishing Present".

Martins later said in an essay on the controversy that

[...] my intentions with this work were not to deliberate on the condition of Photojournalism nor on the need to claim artistic authorship over pictures. [...] Whilst I welcome some of the debate that is taking place, I did not envisage that it would be mostly centered on polarities such as ethical/unethical, right/wrong, real/unreal."

Martins has also claimed that he did not, in fact, represent to The New York Times that his photo essay would be produced without any manipulation, making statements that "on 24 June 2009, two days prior to the project being published, I emailed The New York Times a synopsis of the work describing it as 'a study that goes beyond pure formal investigation and documentation' and that there was “a clear misunderstanding concerning the values and rights associated to the creative process which made a publication like The New York Times Magazine, commission a fine-artist, such as myself, to depict a very specific view of reality without taking all the necessary measures to ensure that I was aware of its journalistic parameters and limits.”

Between August and November 2009 several philosophers, writers and curators spoke out on the matter, publicly supporting the artist, his work and the discussion which it ignited. Portuguese curator Jorge Calado remarked that "Photography begins with an “f” sound that stands for fiction, fake or forgery. And that is the original sin of photography. Only the most untainted purists (and the pedantic New York Times) seem to be unaware of this."

== Bibliography ==
- 1999 Reflexos, Desequilíbrios e Espaços de Intersecção, Leal Senado de Macau, Macao
- 2001 Of Shadow and No-places, Fundação Oriente, Macao
- 2003 Black Holes & Other Inconsistencies, The Moth House, Bedford
- 2006 Approaches, ANA & The Moth House, Bedford
- 2006 The Diminishing Present, The Moth House, Bedford
- 2008 Topologies, Centro de Artes Visuais, Coimbra
- 2008 Edgar Martins: Topologies, Aperture, New York
- 2009 When Light Casts no Shadow, Dewi Lewis, Londres / London
- 2010 Edgar Martins: The Wayward Line, Centre culturel Calouste Gulbenkian, Paris
- 2010 This is not a House, Dewi Lewis, Londres / London
- 2011 The Time Machine: An Incomplete & Semi-Objective Survey of Hydro Power Stations, The Moth House, Londres / London
- 2011 This is not a House, Dewi Lewis/The Moth House, Londres / London
- 2012 The Time Machine: An Incomplete & Semi-Objective Survey of Hydro Power Stations(Collector’s Edition), The Moth House, Londres / London
- 2014 The Rehearsal of Space & The Poetic Futility to Manage the Infinite, La Fabrica /The Moth House, Londres / London
