= Open Live Writer =

Desktop app for developing and publishing blog posts

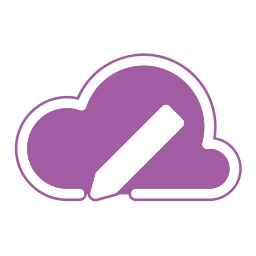

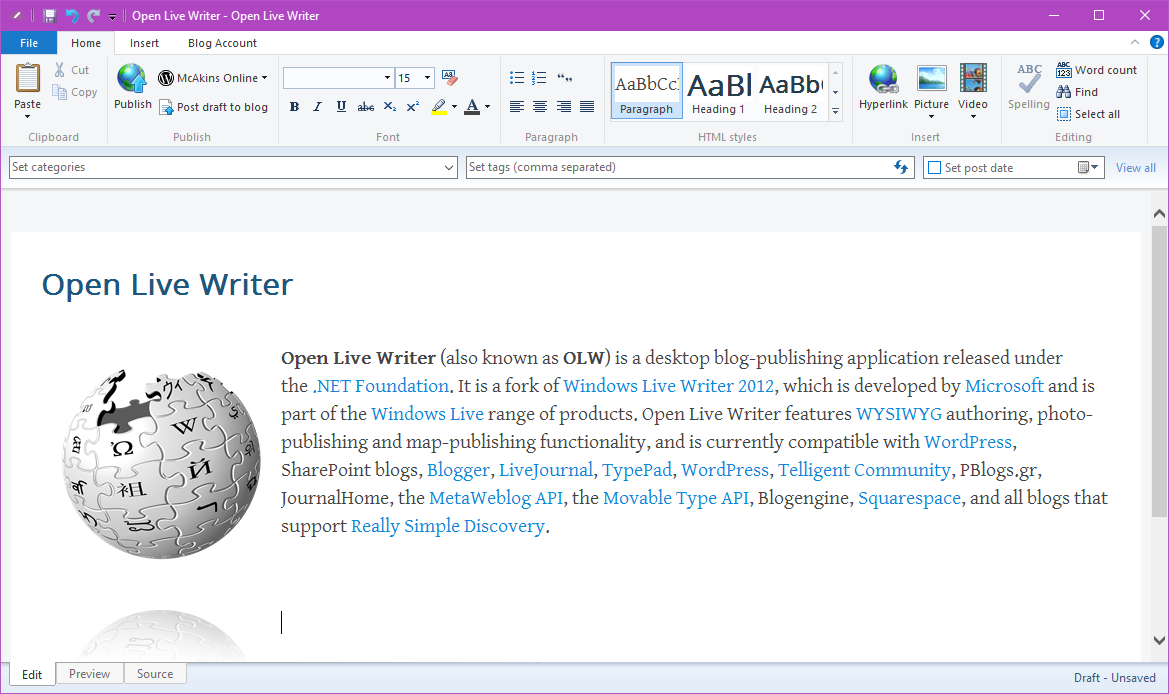
- Open Live Writer 0.5
- Original author: Microsoft
- Developer: .NET Foundation
- Preview release: 0.6.2.0 / May 23, 2017; 8 years ago
- Repository: github.com/OpenLiveWriter/OpenLiveWriter
- Written in: C# and C++
- Operating system: Windows 7 and later
- Platform: IA-32 and x64
- Type: Blog software
- License: MIT License
- Website: openlivewriter.com

Open Live Writer (also known as OLW) is a free and open-source desktop blogging application released by .NET Foundation. It is a fork of Windows Live Writer 2012 by Microsoft. Open Live Writer features WYSIWYG authoring, photo-publishing and map-publishing functionality, and is currently compatible with WordPress.com, WordPress (hosted), and Blogger, with support for more platforms planned. The application's source code is available on GitHub under the MIT License.

== History ==
=== Windows Live Writer ===
Open Live Writer is a fork of Windows Live Writer, which is based on Onfolio Writer, a product Microsoft obtained from the acquisition of Onfolio in 2006. The Onfolio Writer team worked together with the Windows Live Spaces team to release Windows Live Writer. After the release of Windows 8, Microsoft encouraged the team responsible for the software to focus on Metro-style apps, and the last major version of Windows Live Writer was released in 2012.

On June 12, 2014, Scott Hanselman announced the idea of making Windows Live Writer open-source. Nearly a year later, it appeared that open-sourcing the program was approved by Microsoft. Later that year, .NET Foundation announced an open-source fork of Windows Live Writer.

=== Initial announcement ===
On December 9, 2015, Scott Hanselman announced the forking of Microsoft's Windows Live Writer as an open-source project called Open Live Writer. The announcement notes that the original Windows Live Writer 2012 application will remain a property of Microsoft and will continue to be offered as part of Windows Essentials while Open Live Writer will be developed independently as a separate project as part of .NET Foundation. A downloadable preview version of the application was offered the same day alongside the full source code on GitHub.

On 27 September 2016, Open Live Writer became available on Windows Store.

=== Version history ===
Legend:
Unsupported
Supported
Latest version

Table of versions: Open Live Writer
| Version | Release date | Highlights |
|---|---|---|
| 0.5.0.0 | December 9, 2015 | Initial public release; Relatively unchanged from Windows Live Writer 2012 with the following features removed: Spell checker, "Blog This" API, and the "Albums" feature.; Supported publishing platforms: WordPress.com, Hosted Wordpress, Google's Blogger. |
| 0.5.1.2 | December 16, 2015 | This release provided the initial version of Blogger support using their latest API to unblock users of Blogger.; Blogger categories/labels not yet supported. |
| 0.5.1.3 | December 22, 2015 | This release provided some bug fixes and enhancements to the Blogger support based on feedback. |
| 0.5.1.4 | December 23, 2015 | Minor update that addresses the bugs introduced in previous update |
| 0.6.0.0 | February 13, 2016 | Added spell checking through the built-in spell checking functionality of Windows 8 and later. This feature is not available on Windows 7.; Added support for categories when working with Blogger.; Bug fixes and general improvements |
| 0.6.2.0 | May 23, 2017 | Made available via Open Live Writer at the Windows Store. Updates are now installed through the Store rather than a built-in background updater.; Fix scaling of categories dropdown and options dialog; Implement per-monitor DPI Support; Add support to CSS3 templates |

== See also ==
- Desktop Publishing
- Content Management System
