= The Internet of Garbage =

Book by Sarah Jeong

- Author: Sarah Jeong
- Genre: Non-fiction
- Published: 2015
- Publisher: Forbes; The Verge (2018 reissue)
- Media type: Digital (e-book)
- ISBN: 978-0-692-18121-8

The Internet of Garbage is a 2015 non-fiction book by journalist and lawyer Sarah Jeong. It discusses online harassment as a threat to the useful functions of the internet and argues for new approaches to managing the issue. The book was reissued in 2018 with a new preface by Jeong.

== Publication history ==
In 2015, Forbes published The Internet of Garbage in 2015 as part of their "Forbes Signature Series" of e-books. In 2018, The Verge reissued a "1.5" version of the book with a new preface by Jeong after she joined the editorial board of The New York Times.

== Content ==
The thesis of the book is that most of the internet has always been garbage, which has always threatened to make the internet useless. Spam is one such form of garbage, and it has been addressed, imperfectly but manageably, through the use of technology and human curation. Online harassment, especially of women and people of color, has become the newest kind of garbage, and new ways of thinking, new law, and new technologies are needed to manage it.

Written after the concentrated harassment campaigns perpetrated against Caroline Criado Perez in 2013 and multiple other women in the Gamergate controversy in 2014, the book deals with issues of online harassment, and especially gender- and race-related harassment, with an emphasis on the physical danger caused by doxing. The book describes how harassment makes the Internet smaller, and less free for its targets, and seeks to broaden the frontier of free speech for all Internet users. It also discusses the effects of online visibility on social reputation, and spam.

Writing from a legal and policy perspective, Jeong describes how the regulations applied to the Internet, such as the DMCA and the Communications Decency Act, have been based in copyright law and are focused on taking down problematic content after it has been posted, and were designed to protect corporate interests. She describes how this has made user-generated social media much more viable than it could otherwise have been, but on the other hand, it has left platforms without a framework or legal motivation to address hate speech, harassment, and propaganda. The book suggests other approaches to dealing with harassment, more akin to the way that spam is filtered.

== Reception ==
The Internet of Garbage was favorably received in the technology press and by feminist organizations. Writing for Techdirt, Mike Masnick reviewed the book as "nuanced and well worth reading". Author and professor Alan Jacobs called it "very well done, and rather sobering". Fortune called the 2018 reissue "more valuable than ever".
