= Pyra Labs =

American company

- Company type: Subsidiary
- Founded: January 1, 1999; 27 years ago
- Headquarters: San Francisco, California, U.S.
- Owner: Google
- Products: Blogger
- Website: pyra.com
- Current status: Offline, February 17, 2003

Pyra Labs is a subsidiary of Google (Alphabet) that created the Blogger service in 1999. Google acquired Pyra Labs in 2003.

== History ==
Pyra was co-founded by Evan Williams and Meg Hourihan. The company's first product, also named "Pyra", was a web application which would combine a project manager, contact manager, and to-do list. Their coder Paul Bausch altered an ftp program to work on a webpage, enabling online users to upload to a webpage web-log. In 1999, while still in beta, the rudiments of Pyra were repurposed into an in-house tool which became Blogger. The service was made available to the public in August 1999. Much of this coding was done by Paul Bausch and Matthew Haughey.

Initially, Blogger was completely free of charge and there was no revenue model. In January 2001, Pyra asked Blogger users for donations to buy a new server. When the company's seed money dried up around the same time, the employees continued without pay for weeks or, in some cases, months; but this could not last, and eventually Williams faced a mass walk-out by everyone including co-founder Hourihan. Williams ran the company virtually alone until he was able to secure an investment by Trellix after its founder Dan Bricklin became aware of Pyra's situation. Eventually advertising-supported Blogspot and Blogger Pro emerged.

In 2002, Blogger was completely re-written to license it to other companies, the first of which was Globo.com of Brazil.

On February 17, 2003, Pyra was acquired by Google for an undisclosed sum.
