= Sarah Jeong =

American journalist (born 1988)

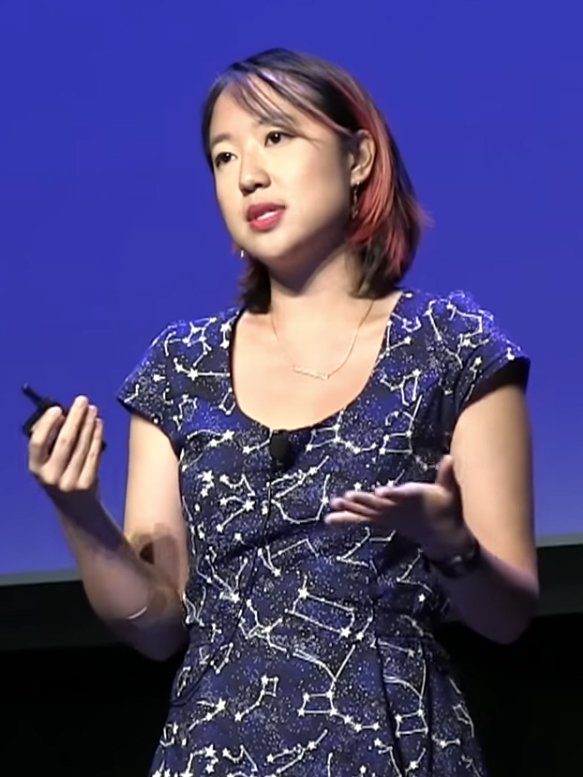
- Jeong speaking at the XOXO festival in 2016
- Born: 1988 (age 37–38); South Korea
- Education: University of California, Berkeley; Harvard Law School
- Occupation: Journalist
- Employer: The New York Times
- Notable work: The Internet of Garbage
- Website: sarahjeong.net

Sarah Jeong (/dʒɒŋ/; born 1988) is an American journalist specializing in information technology law and other technology-related topics. A member of the editorial board of The New York Times from 2018 to 2019, she was formerly a senior writer for The Verge and a contributing editor for Vice Media's Motherboard website. She is the author of The Internet of Garbage, a non-fiction book about online harassment. In 2022, she rejoined The Verge as deputy features editor.

== Early life and education ==
Jeong was born in South Korea in 1988. When she was three years old, her parents immigrated to the United States as students and brought Sarah with them. Raised as a Southern Baptist, Jeong attended a religious high school near Los Angeles. She later told Willamette Week that the Internet helped her to counter religious dogmas of her upbringing such as creation science, saying, "it's how I unbrainwashed myself".

Jeong studied philosophy at the University of California, Berkeley, and received a law degree from Harvard Law School, where she was editor of the Harvard Journal of Law & Gender. She received a green card while attending college and became a naturalized U.S. citizen in 2017.

== Career ==
Jeong writes on law, technology and internet culture. She is a former senior writer for The Verge and previously served as a contributing editor for Vice Media's Motherboard website, as well as writing articles for Forbes, The Guardian, and The New York Times. From 2014 to 2015, Jeong and Electronic Frontier Foundation activist Parker Higgins published an email newsletter called "5 Useful Articles" about copyright law and the Internet.

In 2015, Jeong covered the Silk Road trial for Forbes. That same year, she published The Internet of Garbage, a non-fiction book on the threat of online harassment and responses to it by media and online platforms. The book discusses active moderation and community management strategies to improve online interactions.

In January 2016, Jeong posted a tweet caricaturing Bernie Sanders's supporters as Bernie Bros in response to online attacks against women and Black Lives Matter advocates. A campaign harassing Jeong ensued that lasted for weeks and included rape threats; it drove her to make her Twitter account private and take an unpaid leave from her job at Motherboard.

Jeong was a Yale University Poynter Fellow in Journalism in 2016. In 2017, she wrote about the Trump travel ban. The same year, Forbes named Jeong in its "30 Under 30" list for media.

In August 2018, Jeong was hired by The New York Times to join its editorial board as lead writer on technology. The hiring sparked a strongly negative reaction in conservative media, which highlighted derogatory tweets about white people that Jeong had posted mostly in 2013 and 2014. Critics characterized her tweets as being racist; Jeong released an apology, saying that the tweets were meant to satirize online harassment toward her as a woman of color. Editors at The Verge defended Jeong, saying that the tweets had been disingenuously taken out of context and comparing the episode to the harassment of women during the Gamergate harassment campaign.

In August 2019, Jeong left The New York Times's editorial board, becoming an opinion columnist with the newspaper. In January 2022, she rejoined The Verge as the deputy features editor.

== Selected publications ==
- Jeong, Sarah (2017). "Dogecoin". In Maurer, Bill; Swartz, Lana (eds.). Paid: Tales of Dongles, Checks, and Other Money Stuff. Cambridge, Mass.: The MIT Press. doi:10.7551/mitpress/10489.003.0009. ISBN 978-0-262-33834-9.

== See also ==
- Technology journalism
