= Upcoming =

Social event calendar website

- Upcoming homepage in July 2017
- Website type: Events, Social Networking
- Owner: Yahoo! (2005-2013)
- Creators: Andy Baio, Gordon Luk, Leonard Lin
- Website: upcoming.org
- Commercial: Yes
- Registration: Not required
- Launched: September 19, 2003; 23 years ago
- Current status: Active

Upcoming (formerly Upcoming.org) is a social event calendar website that launched in 2003, founded by Andy Baio.

== Features ==
Upcoming combines features of an event calendar and a social networking site. Primarily, the site is a searchable, browseable repository of upcoming events, such as art exhibits, conferences, and music concerts. Event information is primarily contributed by the user community, although in its later years, an increasing percentage of event data originated from commercial sources. Users can indicate their plans by marking that they are "watching" or "going" to an event. Users can also establish "friend" relationships with each other and receive notifications about what their friends are attending.

The site switched to the Yahoo! user accounts system in early 2007, and changed its domain name to upcoming.yahoo.com. At the same time, the site formally changed its name from "Upcoming.org" to simply "Upcoming".

Upcoming uses iCalendar, GeoRSS, and RSS for content syndication and supports an open API for searching or submitting event data. It also uses hCalendar microformats, so that events can be downloaded directly into calendar applications.

Upcoming homepage in October 2008

== History ==
On October 4, 2005, Upcoming.org was acquired by Yahoo!. In April 2013, Yahoo! announced the retirement of Upcoming.

On May 7, 2014, Andy Baio launched a Kickstarter campaign to re-launch upcoming.org independently of Yahoo!
