= Meg Hourihan =

American writer

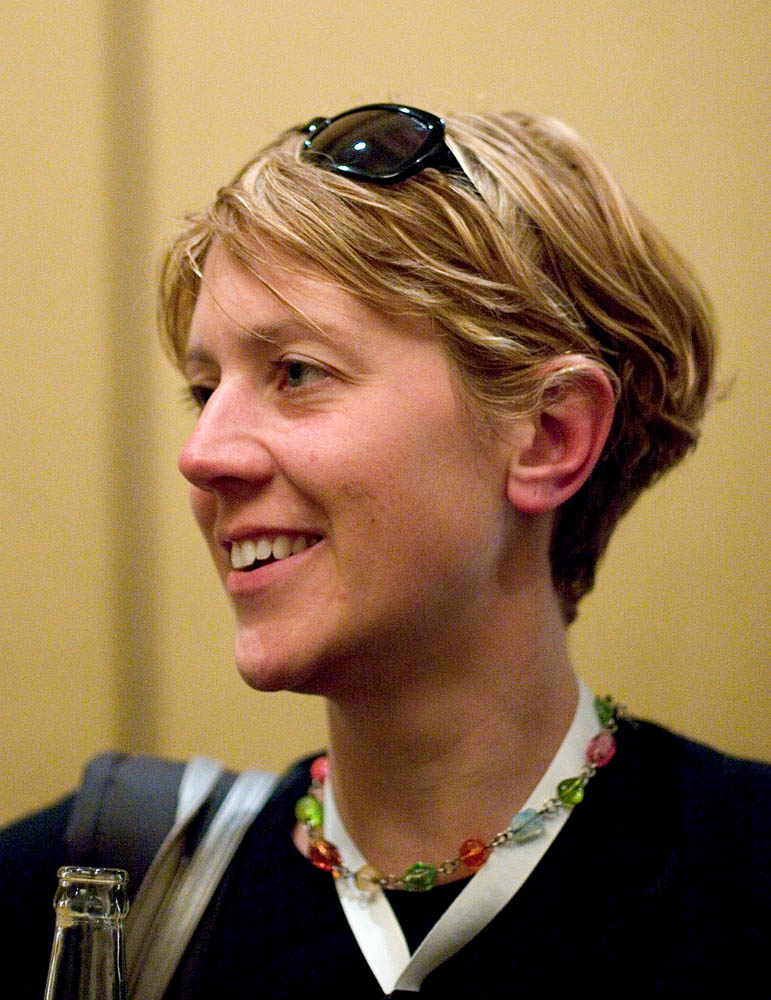
- Education: Tufts University
- Notable work: Co-founder of Pyra Labs
- Spouse: Jason Kottke (divorced)
- Children: 2

Meg Hourihan is the co-founder of Pyra Labs, the company that launched the Blogger personal blogging software that was acquired by Google.

== Career ==
Hourihan graduated from Tufts University in 1994.

In 1999, she and Evan Williams co-founded Pyra Labs. The company's first product, also named "Pyra", was a web application which would combine a project manager, contact manager, and to-do list. In 1999, while still in beta, the rudiments of Pyra were repurposed into an in-house tool which became Blogger. In 2001 she left the company following a mass walk-out due to economic difficulties.

She continued publishing weblogs at Megnut.com until November 2013 and meg.hourihan.com until June 2006. She co-founded Kinja along with Nick Denton of Gawker Media.

She is the co-author of We Blog: Publishing Online with Weblogs (ISBN 0-7645-4962-6), and a frequent speaker at technical conferences concerning online journalism and the role of women in technology. In 2003, she was named to the MIT Technology Review TR100 as one of the top 100 innovators in the world under the age of 35. PC Magazine named Evan Williams, Paul Bausch, and Hourihan — the Blogger team — as People of the Year in 2004.

She was a member of the RSS Advisory Board from 2006 to 2007.

== Personal life ==
Hourihan married fellow blogger Jason Kottke on March 25, 2006, and they have a son and daughter. The couple separated in 2017.
