= The Viral Factory =

British ad agency

- Type: Public
- Industry: Viral Marketing
- Founded: London, United Kingdom (2001)
- Founder: Ed Robinson, Matt Smith
- Headquarters: London, United Kingdom
- Area served: Global
- Website: theviralfactory.com

The Viral Factory is a full-service advertising agency based in Shoreditch, United Kingdom.

== History ==
The Viral Factory was founded in 2001 by Ed Robinson and Matt Smith. Their first venture was a collaboration with director Adam Stewart and creatives Richard Peretti and Gary Lathwell to create Headrush, an in-house promotional viral which gained the fledgling company its first web audience. Another collaboration with Adam Stewart; Moontruth aided in establishing the viral as a tool for public and media notoriety. One of The Viral Factory's first major corporate campaigns was a series of virals for the United States brand Trojan Condoms U.K / European launch. This in turn led to an increase in global blue chip clients and further viral campaigns with brands such as Microsoft, Ford and Coca-Cola.

In 2010 The Viral Factory closed its USA branch.

== Style and content ==
The Viral Factory work on feeding basic human emotions with anarchic versions of reality to get their client's message across, often using a mockumentry film technique or computer generated animation to convince the viewer that the footage is real.

The Viral Factory has, on occasions, used ‘covert seeding’ to amplify the supposed authenticity of their footage, particularly in the Levi ‘Freedom to Move’ campaign of 2006.

== Notable clients ==
- Trojan Condoms — The Trojan campaign parodied Olympic events, substituting them with sexual "sports", such as Pelvic Power Lifting and Masters of Precision Vaulting.
- BBC Health and Education — GI Jonny is a parody of a retro children's action toy television commercial. Sponsored by the BBC to raise AIDS awareness amongst 16- to 25-year-old British males, starring 'GI Jonny' and 'Captain Bareback'.
- Samsung — An animation created using the product to illustrate its functions.

== Controversy ==
- ‘Moontruth’ Playing in to the hands of conspiracy theorists, a film was leaked to the public that supposedly proved that man had never in fact landed on the Moon and that the Apollo 11 Moon landing was in fact staged in a television studio. This viral hoax led to 3,000 people, taken in by the footage, calling NASA to complain about their dishonesty in saying that they had conquered the Moon.
- Ford Ka campaign. A viral entitled ‘Cat’ for the Ford Ka found notoriety in 2006, depicting a cat getting its head chopped off in the ‘Ka’ roof. The viral caused outrage which led to the advertising agency that allegedly commissioned the viral and Ford, the client, to claim that they had never approved the viral's release.

== Awards ==
- Cannes Cyber Gold Lion: Trojan Games (2004), Revenge Phillips amBX (2006)
- EPICA Gold : Axe/Lynx ‘Ravenstoke’ (2005)
- London International Awards Gold, Viral : ‘Fingerskilz’ Hewlett Packard (2007)
- Webby Awards Not for profit People's Voice Winner : ‘GI Jonny’ BBC Learning (2008)
- D&AD Yellow Pencil, Viral Animation & Motion Graphics & YouTube 2007 awards nomination, Most creative for ‘How we met’ Samsung Electronics (2008)

== See also ==
- Viral marketing
- Seeding agency
- Viral video
- List of Internet phenomena
- Webby Awards
