= Andy McMillan (designer) =

Designer, event organiser, and non-alcoholic beverage entrepreneur

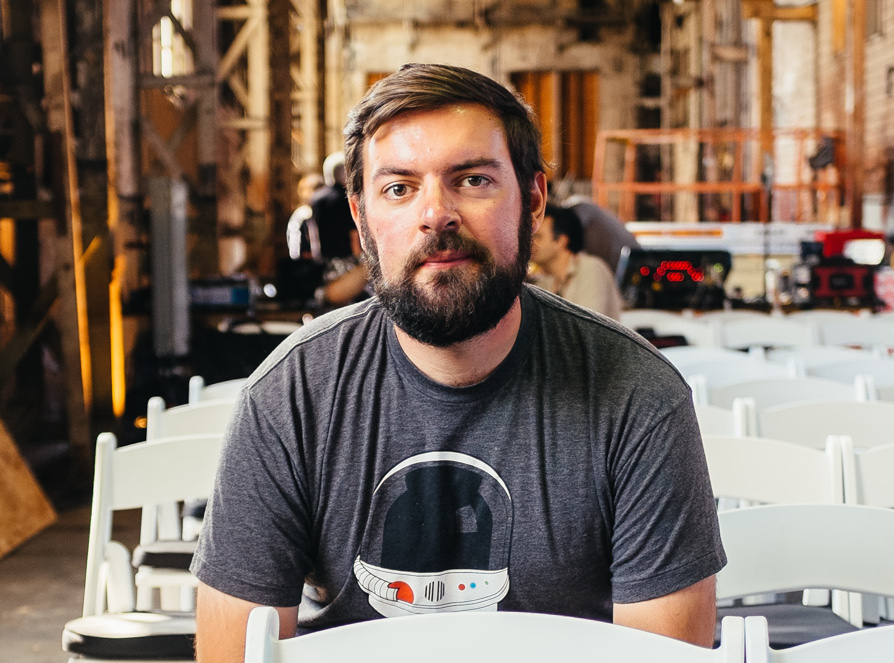
- Andy McMillan in 2014
- Born: Belfast, Northern Ireland
- Occupation(s): Designer, event organiser, non-alcoholic beverage entrepreneur
- Known for: XOXO; Build; Suckerpunch; Heck
- Website: andymcmillan.com

Andy McMillan is a designer, event organiser, and non-alcoholic beverage entrepreneur. He ran the Build web design conference in Northern Ireland, and co-founded the XOXO indie artist and creator festival with Andy Baio in Portland, Oregon. McMillan also founded the Portland-based Suckerpunch non-alcoholic cocktail bar and Heck non-alcoholic brewery.

== Life and education ==
McMillan grew up in Belfast, Northern Ireland. He attended university at Queen's University Belfast for Music Technology, hoping to make his way into a career in radio production. McMillan lives in Portland, Oregon.

== Conferences ==
=== Build ===
McMillan launched the Build web design conference in 2009. It was held annually in Belfast, Northern Ireland from 2009 to 2013. Starting as a single day of talks, it grew into a week-long festival, including music, film screenings, workshops, evening lectures, and a beer festival.

The first Build was held in 2009 at Waterfront Hall, with positive coverage from the BBC and Wired. The Belfast Telegraph said it was a "must-attend" that "provides nourishment for the design geek's soul."

In May 2012, PayPal froze two of McMillan's accounts, withholding over $64,000 of funds collected from Build's ticket sales. The resulting social media backlash led to a public response and personal apology to McMillan from former PayPal president David A. Marcus, who released the funds and asked McMillan to work with him personally on improving the service.

=== XOXO ===
In early 2012, McMillan and Andy Baio co-founded the XOXO festival, which describes itself as "an experimental festival celebrating independent artists and creators working on the internet". The conference was held annually in Portland, Oregon, from 2012 to 2019 and in 2024. The conferences were largely funded via prepaid tickets and other contributions, including via Kickstarter.

In 2015, McMillan and Baio worked to open the XOXO Outpost, a shared, pay-what-you-can workspace in Portland for members of the XOXO community. The XOXO Outpost was open from February to December 2016, but ultimately shuttered due to high rental costs.

== Non-alcoholic beverages ==
McMillan co-founded the Suckerpunch non-alcoholic cocktail bar in Portland, Oregon, attracting a large online following in early 2020. After running several pop-up events, the COVID-19 pandemic stymied Suckerpunch's original plans to open a physical location, so they began selling non-alcoholic cocktail kits online. Suckerpunch re-opened as a pop-up in the Goat Blocks in February 2022, where they operated until August of that year.

In 2023, McMillan and former Hopworks Urban Brewery head brewer Justin Miller opened Heck, one of the first entirely non-alcoholic breweries in the Pacific Northwest. The brewery uses hops grown in the region, and began by launching an IPA and a lager.
