= Seeding agency =

Marketing agency specializing in strategic content distribution

A seeding agency is a specialized marketing or advertising agency that focuses on the strategic distribution of branded content, products, or messages across the internet to initiate organic growth and virality. Unlike traditional advertising, which relies on paid placements like billboards or television slots, seeding agencies aim to place content within relevant online communities, social networks, and among influencers to trigger secondary sharing by users.

== Core services ==
Seeding agencies typically specialize in several distribution methods designed to maximize reach and engagement.

=== Influencer seeding ===
Influencer seeding, also known as product seeding, involves sending products to individuals with established online followings without a formal contract for a paid post. The objective is to build authentic relationships; if the influencer finds value in the product, they may feature it organically in their content, providing the brand with third-party validation and credibility.

=== Video and content seeding ===
Video seeding focuses on distributing branded films or video content to websites, message boards, and "tastemakers" who are likely to repost the media to their own audiences. This process often targets "hubs"—platforms or individuals with high authority in a specific niche—to ensure the content reaches a relevant demographic.

== Methodology and pricing ==
The seeding process generally involves four stages:

- Identification: Locating relevant influencers, blogs, and communities frequented by the target audience.
- Outreach: Pitching the product or content to these selected hubs, often involving the distribution of complimentary samples to generate organic interest.
- Placement: The actual distribution of the content or delivery of the product.
- Monitoring: Tracking metrics such as shares, sentiment, and conversion rates to measure the campaign's success.

Historically, some agencies operated on a pay-per-hit or per-view model, though modern strategies often prioritize engagement metrics and long-term influencer relationships. Choosing seed consumers with strong influence and ties to brand works better than just choosing consumers with the widest reach.

== See also ==
- Digital marketing
- The Viral Factory
- Word-of-mouth marketing
