= Niche blogging =

Blog with a niche market

Niche blogging is the act of creating a blog with the intent of using it to market to a particular niche market. Niche blogs (also commonly referred to as "niche websites") may appeal to "geographic areas, a speciality industry, ethnic or age groups, or any other particular group of people." While there is also debate that every blog is, in some form, a niche blog, the term as it applies to marketing refers to a particular kind of blog.

Neither blogging nor niche marketing is a new concept. However, only in recent years has the concept of a niche blog come into being.

Niche blogs typically contain affiliate links or advertisements (e.g., pay-per-click or products or both). In some cases, the purpose of the niche blog is to invite the reader into visiting another website that might attempt to sell the reader a product or service.

Niche blogging and spam blogging (i.e., a splog) are often hard to distinguish. However, the reliance of niche blogging on pay-per-click advertising and other revenue streams usually requires blogs to have valuable content related to their chosen niche, unlike a splog.

== Popularity ==
The popularity of niche blogging among new marketers can be attributed to several factors, including cost, adaptability, and generating traffic.

=== Cost ===
Blogging can be a low-cost operation using free hosting platforms, including WordPress, Blogger, and Tumblr. Bloggers who choose to invest may purchase domain names or self-host their blogs for a cost. Self-hosted blogs are popular, as Google also takes a website's speed as a ranking factor; therefore, SEOs recommend web admins to host their blogs on high-quality servers.

=== Effectiveness ===
As far as company-run websites go, niche blogs are an effective marketing tool due to their less sale-oriented nature. By providing useful content for users, rather than just pitching sales, niche blogs encourage product and brand awareness, and are therefore popular in a range of industries as an addition to company websites.

=== Audience targeting ===
Niche bloggers generate revenue by targeting readers in their niche, whether that be a group of fellow professionals in a business or potential clients. The choice of target audience influences which topics bloggers choose to cover and how they present and promote their writings.
