= Jason Kottke =

American blogger and designer (born 1973)

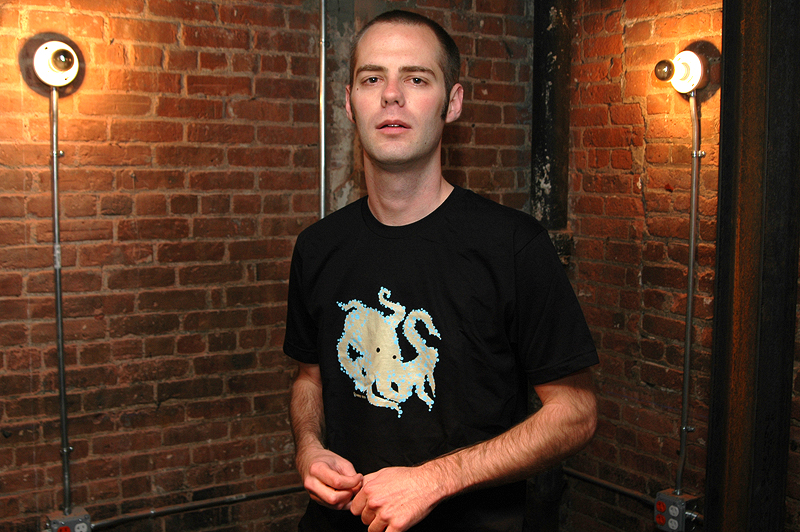
- Kottke in 2005
- Born: September 27, 1973 (age 53)
- Education: Coe College
- Occupations: Blogger, designer
- Known for: kottke.org
- Spouse: Meg Hourihan (divorced)
- Children: 2

Jason Kottke (born September 27, 1973) is an American blogger, graphic designer, and web designer known for his blog Kottke.org. He won a Lifetime Achievement Award as a blogger.

== Design work ==
Kottke attended Coe College on scholarship in Iowa and eventually began a career in design. In 1999, he designed the Silkscreen typeface—since used by Adobe, MTV, and Volvo among others. His design work has appeared in The New Yorker, The New York Times, Forbes, and Brill's Content. Kottke created the iconic Gawker logo in 2002 in what he claims was "whipped up in Photoshop in 30 minutes as a placeholder".

== Kottke.org (blog) ==
Kottke is considered a pioneering blogger and began his blog in March 1998. In 2000, Kottke and his then-girlfriend were profiled in a New Yorker article, "You've Got Blog", which introduced blogging to a wider audience. His contributions to blogging were acknowledged when he won a Bloggie Lifetime Achievement Award in 2003 after five years of blogging. In 2005 Kottke was able to quit his day job to focus on blogging full-time. Kottke writes that as of 2019, "Probably 60 percent of my revenue is from membership, and the rest is from Amazon and ads." His blogging got him in trouble with Sony when he broke the news of the loss that broke Ken Jennings' Jeopardy! win streak.

== Personal life ==
Kottke was married to Meg Hourihan and they have two children. He lives in Vermont.
