= Anil Dash =

American technology executive and entrepreneur

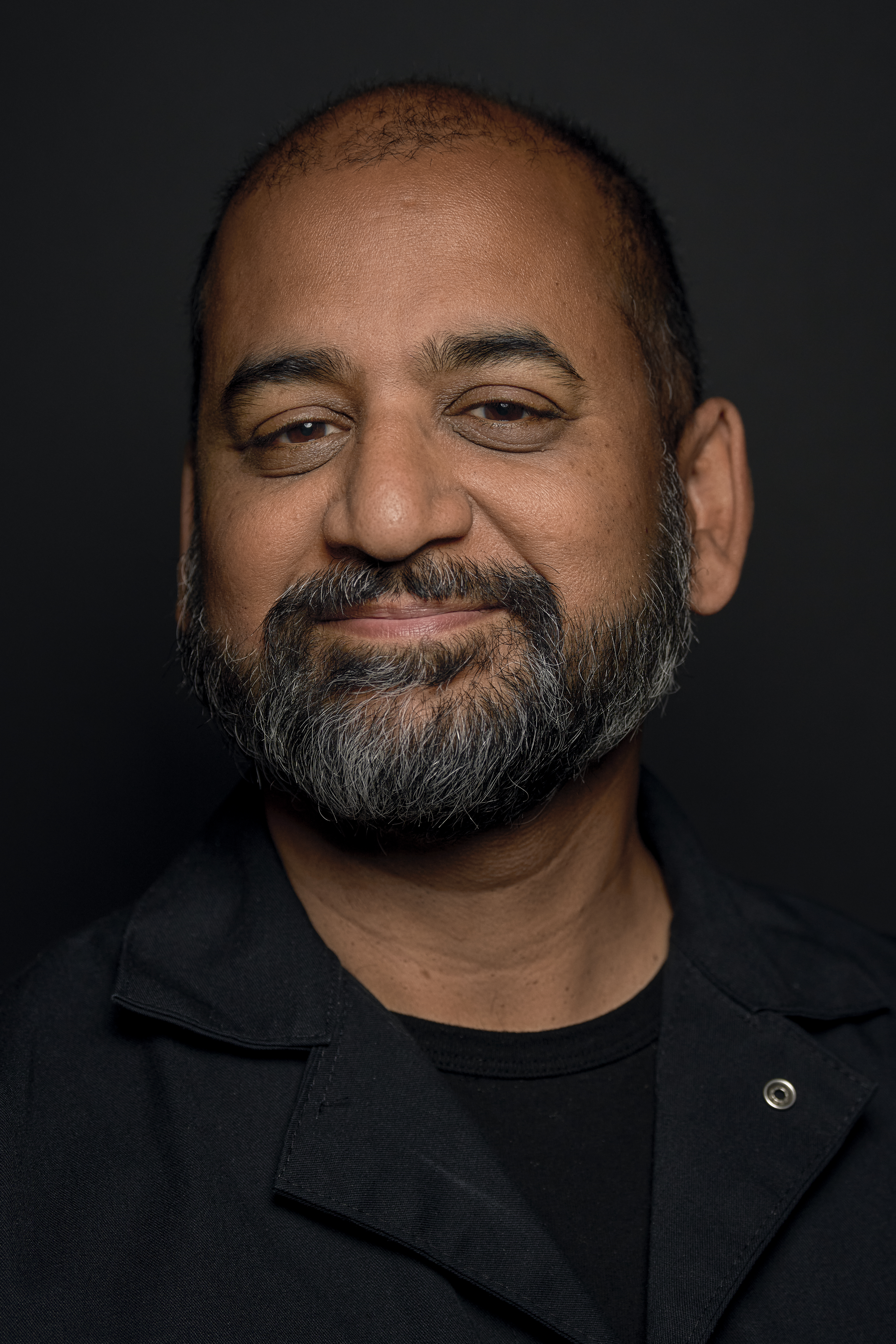
- Dash in 2024
- Born: September 5, 1975 (age 50)
- Occupations: CEO, Glitch
- Spouse: Alaina Browne
- Children: 1
- Website: anildash.com

Anil Dash (/ɑːˈniːl ˈdæʃ/; born September 5, 1975) is an American entrepreneur, Prince scholar, and writer. He was recently the Head of Glitch and VP of Developer Experience at Fastly.

== Career ==
In 1999, Dash launched his personal weblog, dashes.com (now anildash.com), while working as an independent technology consultant. From 2001 to 2003, he worked as a new media developer for the Village Voice before becoming the first employee of Six Apart, the makers of Movable Type, TypePad, and Vox, where he served as a vice president until 2009.

From 2009 to 2012 he served as the director of Expert Labs, a Gov 2.0 project to facilitate political participation. After this work, he became an advisor to the White House Office of Digital Strategy under the Obama administration, trying to help them apply Web 2.0 lessons to government.

He was also previously a partner with Michael J. Wolf in Activate Consulting, a media and technology management consulting firm, and a co-founder (with Gina Trapani) and CEO of ThinkUp, a social media aggregation and analysis tool. The company was shuttered in June 2016. Dash was appointed CEO of Fog Creek Software in December 2016. On September 25, 2018, the company was renamed Glitch after its flagship product. In March 2020, Glitch and its union signed a collective bargaining agreement, the first in the tech industry. Dash was host of Function with Anil Dash, a podcast about technology's effects on culture, co-produced by Glitch and Vox Media The podcast ran for two seasons from 2018 to 2020.

Dash is also a scholar of the musician Prince. He is chair of the board for the Lower East Side Girls Club, and was on the board of Stack Overflow for 10 years. Dash was a founding member of Data & Society's Board of Directors from 2013 to 2021.

== NFTs ==
In 2014, as part of a collaboration with Kevin McCoy, Dash co-created Monegraph, a blockchain-based system for verifying original digital artworks initially called monetized graphics, which has since been called the first implementation of non-fungible tokens (NFTs).

Dash has been critical of present day usage of the NFT concept, stating "The only thing we’d wanted to do was ensure that artists could make some money and have control over their work," and that co-creator "McCoy still believes that blockchain technologies can help artists sustain their work."

== Recognition ==
In 2004, he won an SEO contest which required contestants to get the top Google ranking for the made-up phrase "nigritude ultramarine".

In 2010, Dash's weblog was an honoree in the Personal Blog/Website category of the 2010 Webby Awards. In 2022, along with Kevin McCoy he won a Lifetime Achievement Award at the 26th Annual Webby Awards. Vanity Fair did a small profile on him in a column they called (Twitter) Famous. Dash wrote about his complex feelings about NFTs and about the award.

== Personal life ==
Dash was born to Odia parents from India and grew up near Harrisburg, Pennsylvania. He lives in New York City with his wife Alaina Browne and one child.
