= Eye-Fi =

Company producing Wi-Fi enabled memory cards

Eye-Fi, Inc.
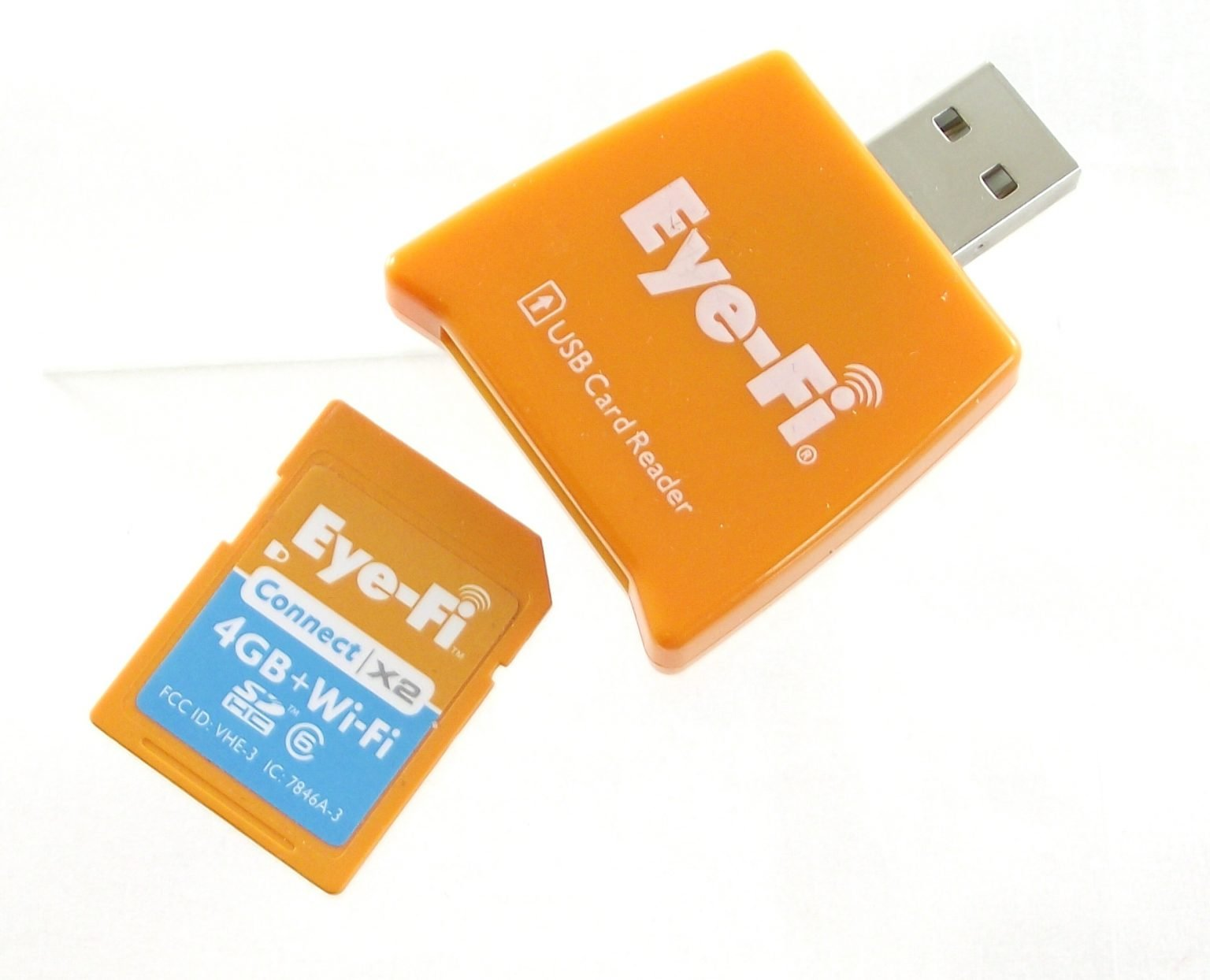
- Type: Private
- Industry: Computer data storage
- Founded: 2005
- Founder: Yuval Koren; Ziv Gillat; Eugene Feinberg; Berend Ozceri
- Defunct: 2016
- Headquarters: Mountain View, California, United States
- Key people: Matt DiMaria (CEO)

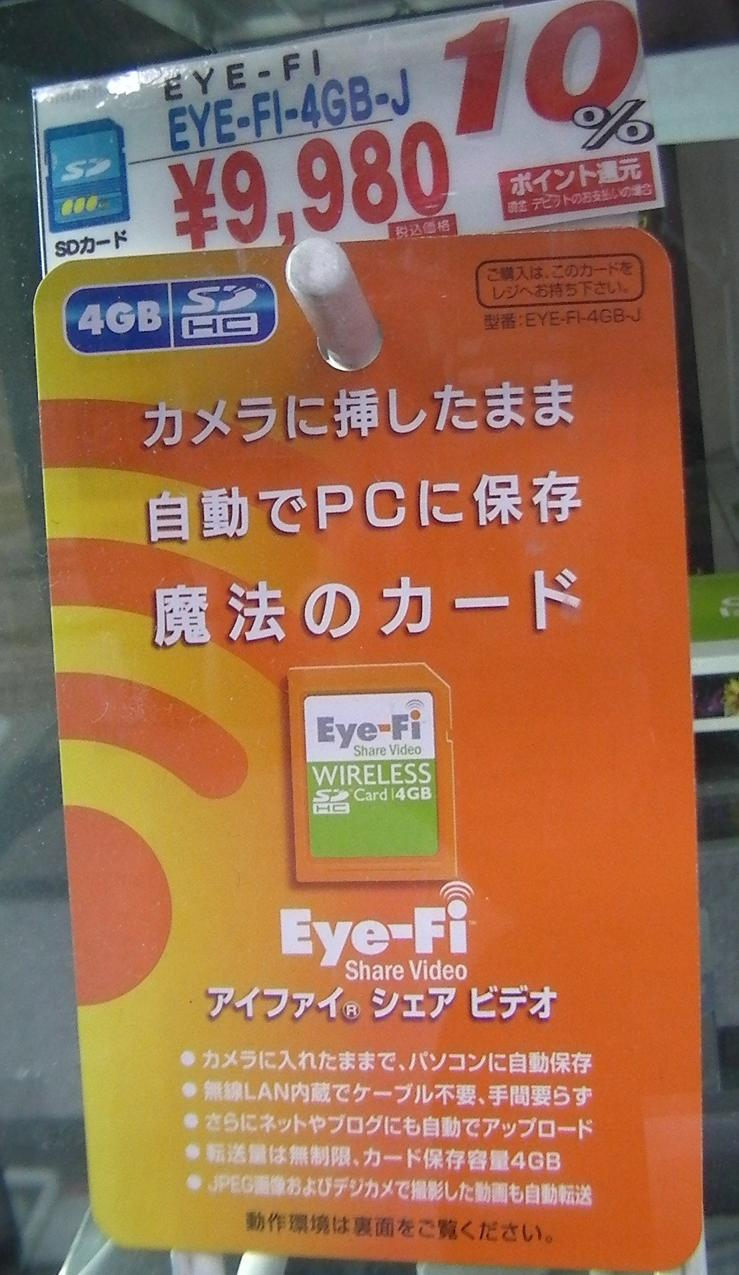
An Eye-Fi card for sale in Tokyo, February 2010

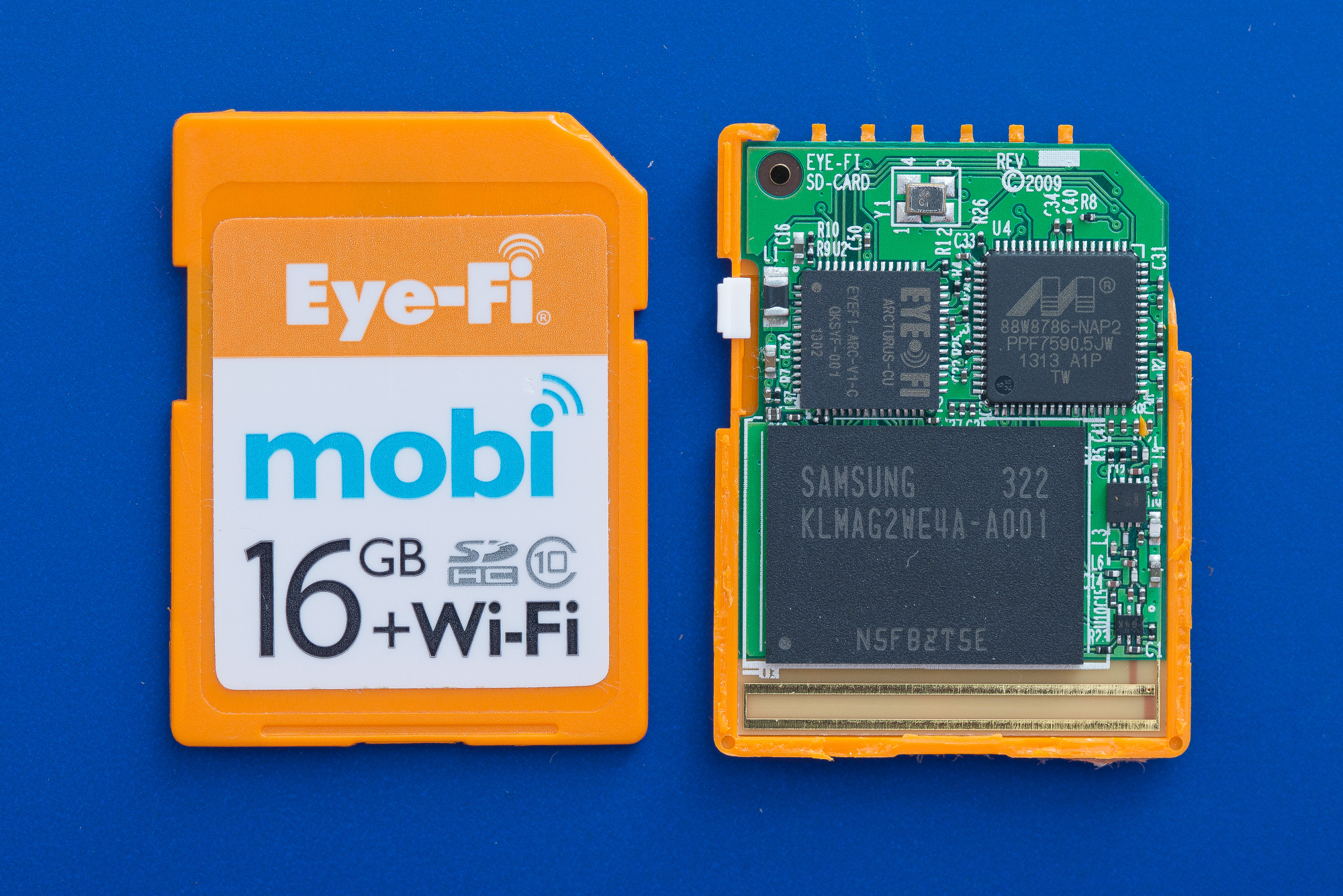
A disassembled 16 GB Eye-Fi card

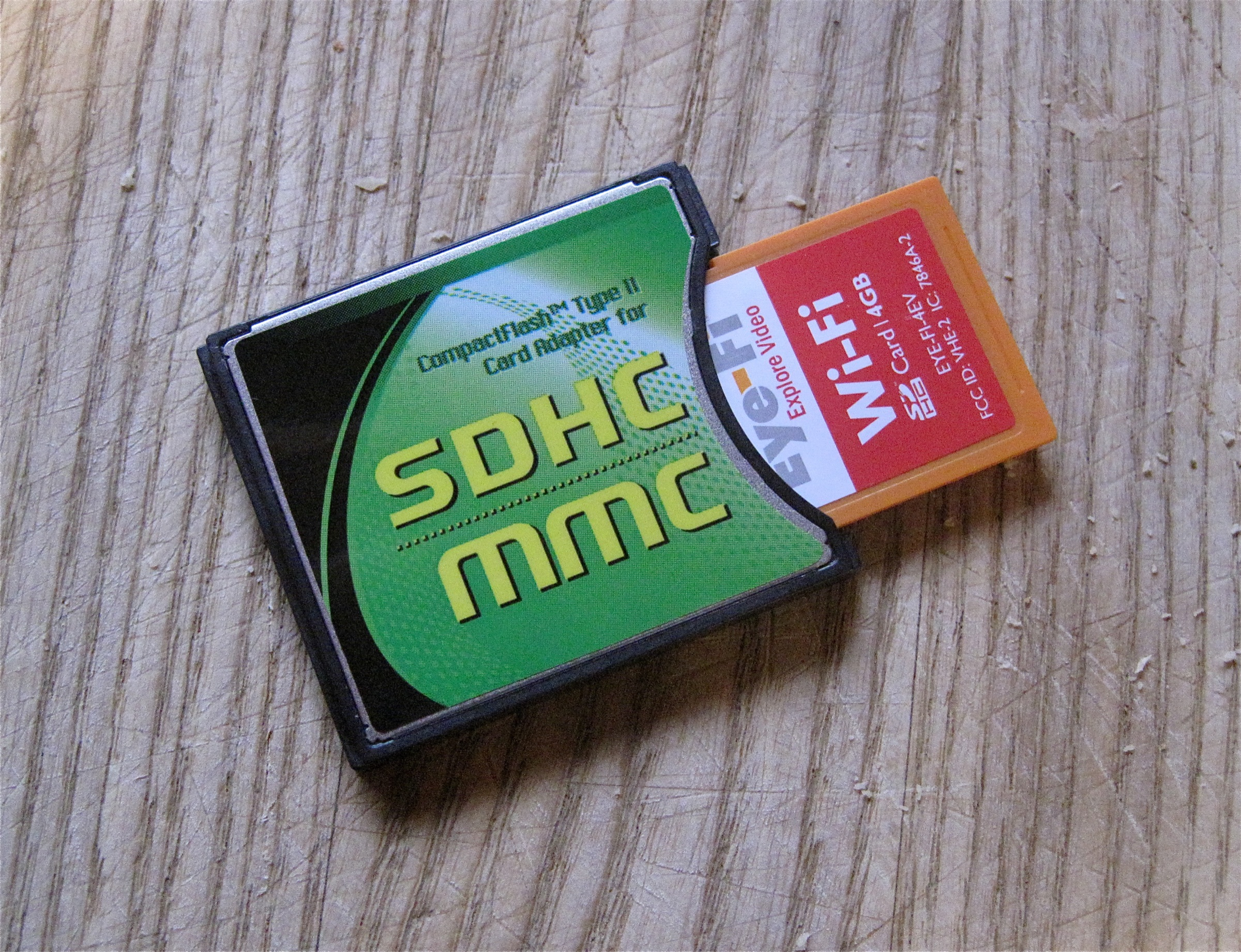
4 GB Eye-Fi card in a CompactFlash adapter

Eye-Fi was a company based in Mountain View, California, that produced SD memory cards with Wi-Fi capabilities. Using an Eye-Fi card inside a digital camera, one could wirelessly and automatically upload digital photos to a local computer or a mobile device such as a smartphone or tablet computer. The company ceased business in 2016.

Eye-Fi offered multiple models that varied in data transfer speed, storage capacity, and the provided software and other services.

== Hardware ==
Eye-Fi was originally known for its Wi-Fi enabled SD Card product line which began commercial shipments in 2007. Starting in 2009, Eye-Fi Geo and subsequent products offered geotagging of photos using a Wi-Fi positioning system. Eye-Fi continually released upgraded versions of its hardware products, most recently the Eyefi Mobi Pro WiFi SD cards available in 16 GB and 32 GB capacities.

Eye-Fi Cards are compatible with virtually all digital cameras manufactured since 2010. Approximately 400 models from Canon, Nikon, Sony, Olympus, Casio and others also include Eye-Fi firmware built into their cameras under the Eye-Fi Connected branding. Eye-Fi Connected cameras are able to control various functions of the Eye-Fi Cards, including the ability to manually turn the Wi-Fi feature on/off.

The core feature of all Eye-fi Cards is the ability to automatically detect when a new image file has been captured on a camera.

=== Eyefi Mobi ===
Once a device running the Eyefi Mobi software detects the presence of an Eyefi Mobi Card, any new images captured on the Card are automatically sent to the device running the Eyefi Mobi app. This mode is referred to as "automatic transfer". In addition, the Mobi Pro product line provides for a "selective transfer" mode in which only photos designated by the user are transferred to the Eyefi Mobi app. Identification of which files to transfer is accomplished using an in-camera operation, usually consistent with files designated as "protected" or "locked".

Initial set-up of Eyefi Mobi and Eyefi Mobi Pro Cards is accomplished by installing the Eyefi Mobi app on the user's device. Once installed, the user is directed to insert the Eyefi Card into their camera and to capture a photo or video. When users start the Eyefi Mobi app on their device the first time, they are prompted to enter the "activation code" for their Eyefi Card. The activation code is provided on a card inside the Eyefi product packaging. Once the user enters the code into the app, the Eyefi Card will begin transferring new files to that device. The set-up operation must be completed for any device to which the user wishes to transfer images from their camera. Once completed, there is no need to repeat the set-up.

Eyefi Mobi Pro products support two major Wi-Fi network types - so called "direct" and "infrastructure" wireless networks. A direct network connection is a peer-to-peer transfer between the Card and the device running the Eyefi app. Infrastructure transfer is accomplished when both the Card and the device running the Eyefi Mobi app are within range of the same router based network. In the latter case, the Eyefi Mobi Pro card must be set-up to recognize the SSID and password of the router-based network. Configuration of the Eyefi Mobi Pro Card to enable selective transfer as well as set-up for router based transfer is accomplished using the Eyefi Mobi Desktop apps on Mac and Windows PC platforms. Eyefi Mobi Cards only support direct mode, automatic file transfer, so no desktop set-up is required.

The card was designed by Eye-Fi and is manufactured in Thailand with proprietary and off-the-shelf components.

== End of support for X2 series cards ==
The company abruptly announced on June 30, 2016, that, due to security vulnerabilities present in the cards, all previous generation cards (X2 and before) would cease to be supported by the company's proprietary software after September 16, 2016. Eye-Fi said that some functions not requiring contact with its servers, such as transfer directly to a computer or mobile device and Selective Transfer, might continue to work, although this was not guaranteed. However, to continue using these modes, they had to be configured before September 16, 2016.

In August 2016, in response to complaints, Eye-Fi announced the "one-time release" of a new, Mac-only software utility "to allow more time for customers seeking an alternative WiFi SD card solution." No updates or support were offered.

The third-party command line utility eyefi-config can be used to retrieve a compatible card's authentication data, which can then be used to manually configure appropriate client software.

== Software ==
Eye-Fi released all new software starting in June 2014 based on the Eye-Fi Mobi product line.

=== Eye-Fi Mobi and Eye-Fi Cloud ===
The Eye-Fi Mobi apps and desktop software are proprietary software products available for Apple and Microsoft's desktop and mobile operating systems, and Google's mobile operating system. Third-party free software exists to enable Eye-Fi cards to be accessed from Linux but the platform is not officially supported.

Eye-Fi Mobi apps are able to receive photos and videos from cameras equipped with the Eye-Fi Mobi WiFi SD memory card. The company announced in October 2015 that the apps will also directly connect to cameras with built-in Wi-Fi radio modules such as GoPro, and selected models from Canon, Casio, Nikon and Olympus.

New photos and videos received into Eye-Fi Mobi apps are saved locally to the native device and optionally can be synchronized to the Eye-Fi Cloud "storage" service. Eye-Fi Cloud provides a hub for all user devices to sync their private photo collection. Original image files are retained in Eye-Fi Cloud and photo are then saved in a compressed JPEG file format to save space on synchronized devices. The original files are always available via browser access to Eye-Fi Cloud (app.eyefi.com). Video files transferred to Eye-Fi Cloud are also saved in their original format but are also transcoded into a streaming media format. Once transcoded, videos can be played back on inside Eye-Fi Mobi apps and within a browser via in-app streaming at 480p resolution.

Beyond storage, Eye-Fi Cloud also provides a range of features designed to simplify organization, access and sharing of private image collections. The enhanced features include machine learning-based analytics of a photo collection, branded as Smart Tags, search based organization "Smart Views" as well as more traditional tagging and album creation. Sharing is accomplished via a variety of methods and generally intended for limited private sharing to individuals and small groups.

Eye-Fi Cloud is free for one year following activation for users who purchase an Eye-Fi Mobi Pro version of the products. Eye-Fi Mobi apps are free for perpetual use with any Eye-Fi Mobi branded product. Eye-Fi Cloud for smartphones and cameras with built-in Wi-Fi is available only to users with a 30-day or 1-year subscription. As of October 2015, the monthly subscription for Eye-Fi Cloud was US$4.99 and the annual subscription was $49.99. Active Eye-Fi Cloud subscriptions support unlimited storage for photos and up to 300 videos of up to 15-minutes per month.

In 2016, Eye-Fi Cloud was purchased by a subsidiary of the Japanese company Ricoh, and rebranded as Keenai. The service is defunct as of December 1, 2018.

== Technical features ==
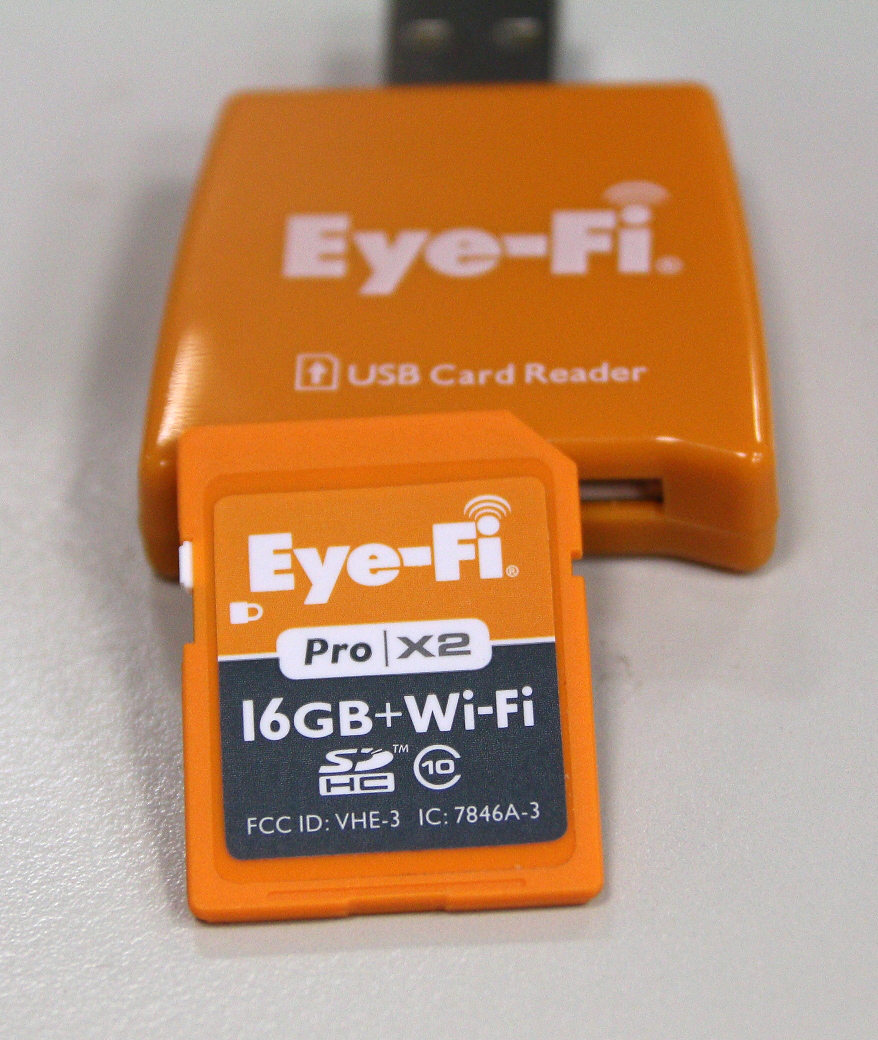
16GB Eye-Fi Pro X2 Card

- Wi-Fi security: Static WEP 64/128, WPA-PSK, WPA2-PSK
- Range: 90+ feet (27.4 m) outdoors and 45+ feet (13.7 m) indoors
- Storage capacity: 2 GB, 4 GB, 8 GB, 16 GB or 32 GB
- Power: Powered through device.
- Card dimensions: SD standard 32 mm × 24 mm × 2.1 mm
- Card weight: 2.835 gram (0.1 oz.)
- 802.11b/g + WMM + TSPEC Support

== Supported photo services ==
- Adobe Photoshop Express
- "Adobe Lightroom". mobihelp.eyefi.com. Archived from the original on July 5, 2015.
- Canon iMage Gateway
- Costco Photo Center
- dotPhoto
- Evernote
- Facebook
- Flickr
- FTP (file transfer protocol)
- Fotki
- Gallery 2
- Kodak EasyShare Gallery
- Phanfare
- Photobucket
- Picasa Web Albums
- RitzPix
- Sharpcast
- Shutterfly
- SmugMug
- Snapfish
- TypePad
- Vox
- Walmart
- Webshots
- Windows Live
- YouTube
- Zenfolio

== Scanner support ==
Some portable document scanners such as the Doxie Go + Wi-Fi and the Xerox Mobile Scanner make use of an Eye-Fi card to provide Wi-Fi capability for document upload. Eye-Fi support for the Xerox scanner was discontinued with the end of support for older generation cards; the scanner continued to be sold as the Xerox Mobile Scanner SD, without Eye-Fi support.

== Awards and accolades ==
Eye-Fi has won the following recognition:

- "CNET Best of CES" at CES Consumer Electronics Show 2010
- "CES Innovations" Honoree at CES Consumer Electronics Show 2010
- "Best of Show" at Macworld 2008
- "Editor's Choice Award 2008" from The Mac Observer
- "Last Gadget Standing" winner, Consumer Electronics Show 2008
- "Last Gadget Standing" live contest winner, Consumer Electronics Show 2009

In November 2007, The Wall Street Journal writer Katherine Boehret called the Eye-Fi card "a terrific little tool".

The magazine Wired placed the Eye-Fi Pro on their "2009 Wish List", calling it "Arbus meets Airbus".

In October 2010, Time magazine technology editor Peter Ha placed the original 2 GB Eye-Fi card on his list of "the 100 greatest and most influential gadgets from 1923 to the present".

== History ==
Eye-Fi was founded in 2005 by Yuval Koren, Ziv Gillat, Eugene Feinberg and Berend Ozceri. Jef Holove became the CEO in September 2007, with Yuval Koren taking over in May 2011. Matt DiMaria became CEO of Eye-Fi in April 2013.

Discontinued models include "Explore X2", "Geo X2", "Pro", "Geo", "Home/Video", "Share/Video", "Explore Video" and an "Anniversary Edition".

== See also ==
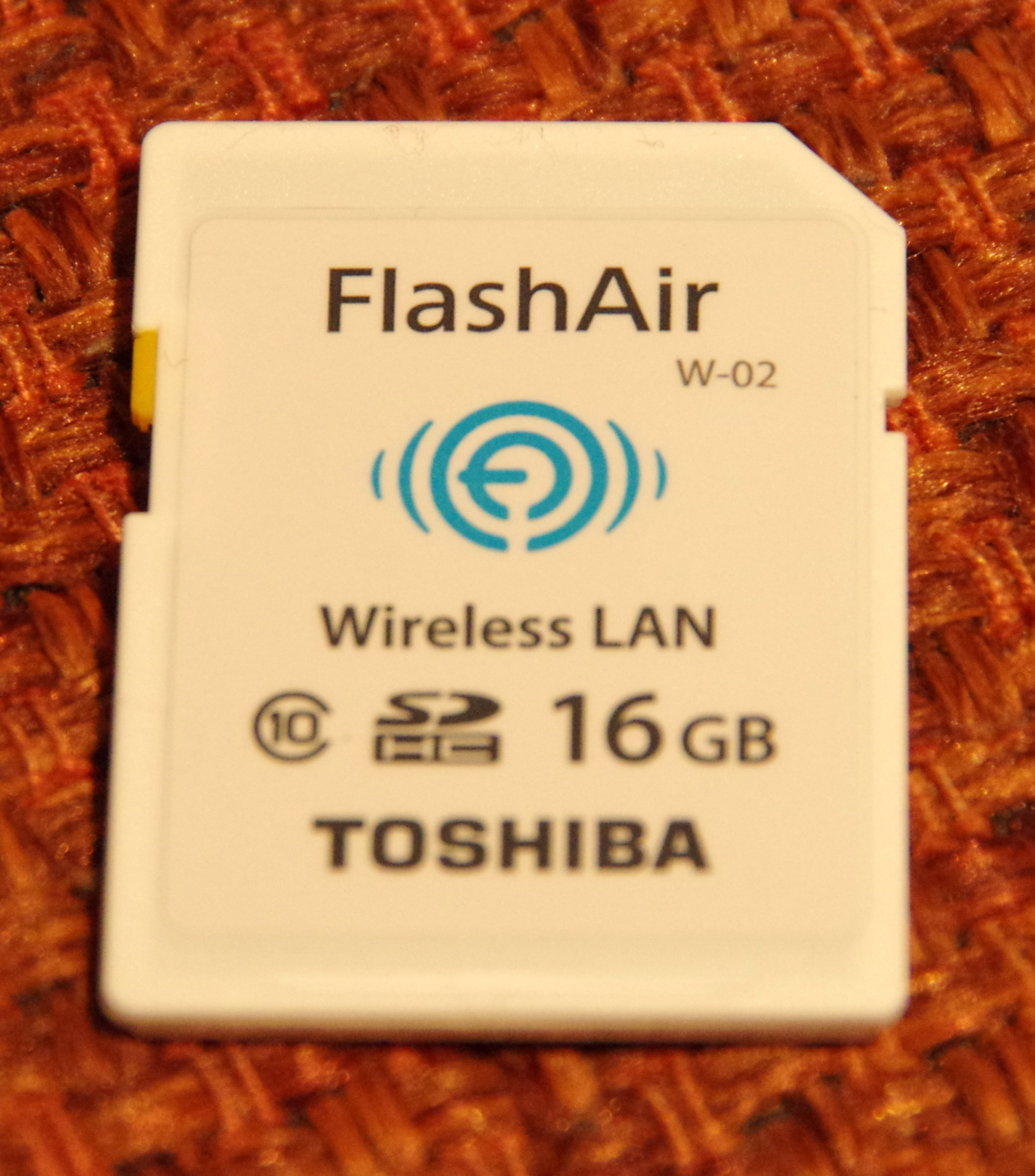
Toshiba FlashAir

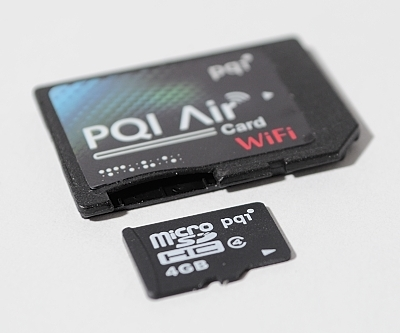
PQI Air Card

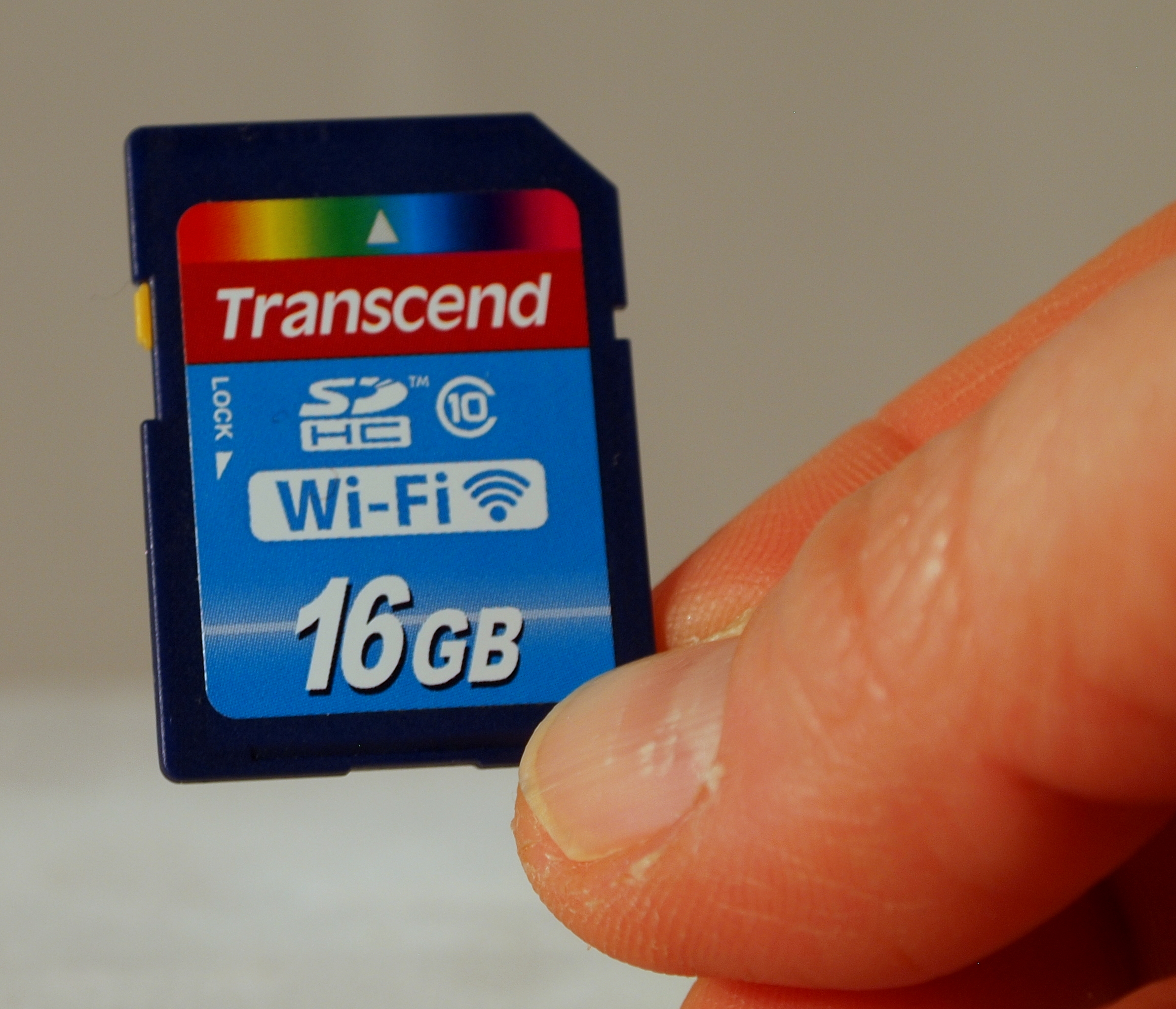
Transcend WiFi SD-Card

- SanDisk
- Transcend Wi-Fi, a similar Wi-Fi SD card
- Toshiba FlashAir, a similar Wi-Fi SD card
- Trek Flucard, a similar Wi-Fi SD card
- LZeal ez Share, a similar Wi-Fi SD card
- PQI Air Card, a similar Wi-Fi SD card
- PHS CF, a PHS wireless modem technology based on CompactFlash cards
