= Ben and Mena Trott =

Ben and Mena Trott may refer to:

- Benjamin Trott
- Mena Grabowski Trott
