= Benjamin Trott =

American blogger

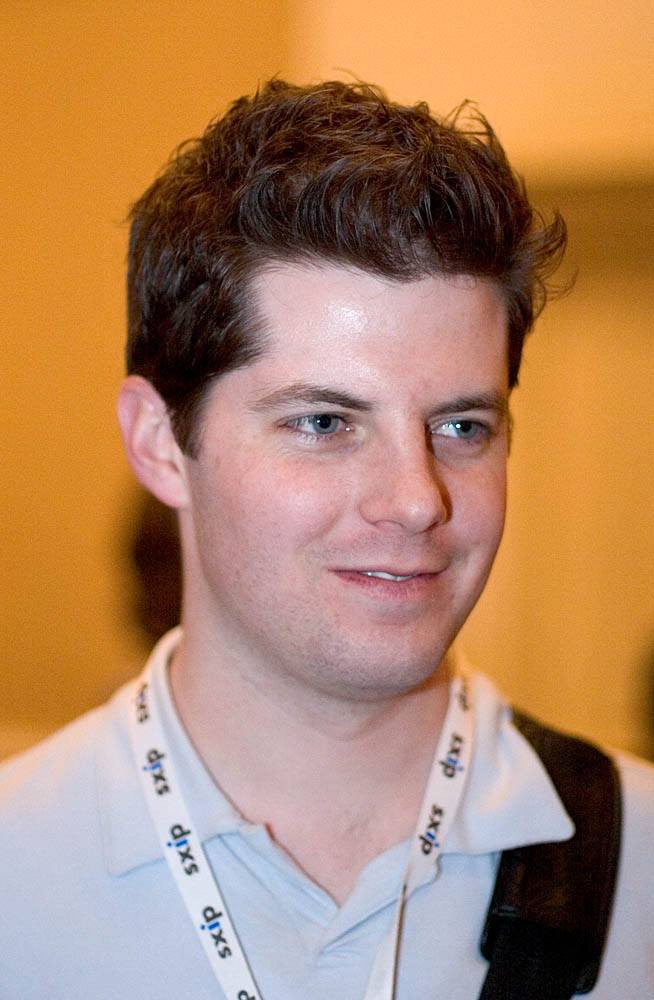
- Benjamin Trott in 2005
- Born: September 22, 1977 (age 49)
- Occupation: Blogger
- Known for: Co-founder of Six Apart, creator of Movable Type and TypePad

Benjamin Trott (born September 22, 1977) is an American software developer and entrepreneur known also as a co-founder of Six Apart with Mena Trott), his ex-wife. He helped develop the company's blogging platforms Movable Type and TypePad. In November 2010, he became Chief Technical Officer (CTO) of SAY Media, a new online advertising and software company formed by a merger of ad network VideoEgg with Six Apart.

== Education ==
Trott graduated from Santa Clara University in 1999 where he studied mathematics with special focus on computer science..

== Career ==
Before the 2010 merger with VideoEgg, Trott served as the chief technology officer of Six Apart. He later became the CTO of SAY Media after the merger was completed in November 2010. He is a regular contributor to CPAN (the Comprehensive Perl Archive Network), and has written for Perl.com and contributed to Essential Blogging. In 2004, he was named to the MIT Technology Review TR100 as one of the top 100 innovators in the world under the age of 35.

== Influence of Six Apart ==
In 2001, Trott developed Movable Type in response to request from Mena Trott, his wife, who wanted extra features for her blog. The couple released the public version of the software within the same year and it was downloaded for over 100 times within the first hour online.

In 2003, Six Apart launched TypePad, a hosted weblog service designed for users who wanted to publish online but have no advanced technical knowledge. Both came under heavy criticism in 2004 after moves to charge users to use the popular Movable Type system, even though there remained a free non-commercial version. In January 2005, Six Apart purchased LiveJournal, another pioneer in blogging, later selling it at a profit. The company also started a fourth blogging solution, Vox, which it shut down shortly before the SAY Media acquisition in late 2010. Say Media later sold TypePad to Endurance International Group.
