= Jane Pratt =

American editor (born 1962)

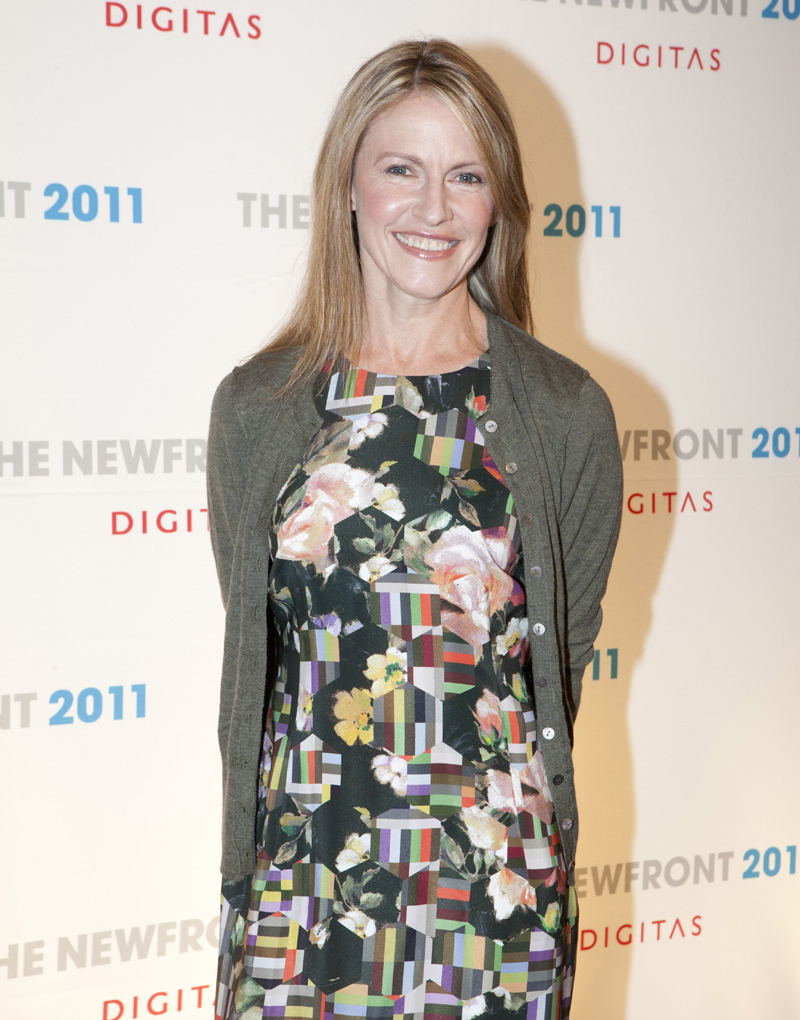
- Born: November 11, 1962 (age 63); San Francisco, California
- Education: Oberlin College
- Occupations: Magazine editor, publisher
- Children: 1

Jane Pratt (born November 11, 1962) is the founding editor of Sassy, Jane and xoJane. She is the host of the talk show Jane Radio on Sirius XM Radio.

== Early life ==
Jane Pratt was born in San Francisco, California, to Sheila Marks Blake, an artist, and Vernon Pratt, a minimalist painter and professor of art at Duke University. Her mother grew up in Queens, New York, and her maternal grandfather, Joseph Marks, was a vice-president of the Doubleday publishing company. Her paternal grandfather was Gaither Pratt, a paranormal psychology researcher at the University of Virginia. Pratt's parents were divorced when she was 13.

She was raised in Durham, North Carolina, and attended Phillips Academy in Andover, Massachusetts, at the age of 15. After graduating from Phillips Academy, Pratt enrolled at Oberlin College in Oberlin, Ohio, where she received a degree in communications with a minor in modern dance. Her publishing career began with internships at Rolling Stone magazine and Sportstyle, a Fairchild Publication. After graduating, Pratt landed her first job as assistant editor of McCall's, and in 1986, became an associate editor of Teenage Magazine. From there, she went on to found Sassy Magazine.

== Career ==
=== Sassy ===
At the age of 24, Pratt became the founding editor of Sassy, a magazine for teenage girls. Under Pratt, the magazine experienced rapid circulation growth. The magazine released a limited-edition Sonic Youth flexi-disc (a cover of the New York Dolls song "Personality Crisis"). Band members Thurston Moore and Kim Gordon were fans of the teen magazine.

The magazine's affinity for indie rock led to the formation of the band Chia Pet, which counted Sassy writer Christina Kelly and Pratt as members. Chia Pet released "Blind Date" on the Kokopop label in 1992, which won simultaneous Single of the Week honors in both NME and Melody Maker.

=== Television and books ===
The success of Sassy led Pratt to host a talk show on Fox in 1992, however, it was cancelled after only 13 weeks. The show moved to Lifetime in 1993 but only lasted 12 weeks due to low ratings.

Pratt was also a frequent contributor to VH-1 and Extra, where she was featured interviewing such personalities as Madonna, Michael Jackson, Michael Stipe of R.E.M., and Drew Barrymore.

Pratt is the author of two books, For Real: The Uncensored Truth About America's Teenagers (Hyperion, September 1995) and Beyond Beauty: Girls Speak Out on Looks, Style and Stereotypes, which is published by Callaway Editions in association with Clarkson Potter.

=== Jane ===
After Sassy was bought by Los Angeles–based Peterson Publishing in 1994, the New York–based Pratt regrouped with several former Sassy staffers to form Jane, a lifestyle magazine for 18- to 34-year-old women which debuted three years later. Its first cover featured actress Drew Barrymore. Other colleagues have included singer Michael Stipe, whom she dated; director Spike Jonze, whom she hired as editor of short-lived teenage boy–targeted Dirt magazine; actress Chloë Sevigny, who was once a summer intern at Sassy; and Pamela Anderson, who wrote a regular monthly column for Jane.

Jane was nominated for a National Magazine Award for General Excellence by the American Society of Magazine Editors, and Pratt was named "Editor of the Year" in 2002 by Adweek.

On July 25, 2005, Pratt announced that she was resigning from her position as editor-in-chief of Jane and would be leaving the company on September 30, 2005, exactly eight years after its debut issue. Circulation had steadily increased since the magazine's debut, with 700,000 readers as of the day Pratt announced she would be stepping down.

On July 9, 2007, Charles Townsend, president and CEO of Condé Nast Publications, announced that Jane magazine would cease publication with its August 2007 issue. The magazine's website, janemag.com, was also to be shut down. "This was a very difficult decision for us," Mr. Townsend said. "We worked diligently to make Jane a success. However, we have come to believe that the magazine and website will not fulfill our long-term business expectations."

=== xoJane ===
In May 2011, Pratt launched women's lifestyle site called xoJane. Pratt and collaborators describe the site as " ...not snarky, but inclusive and uplifting, while remaining nothing but honest at all times. Like Sassy and Jane before it, xoJane.com is written by a group of women (and some token males) with strong voices, identities, and opinions, many in direct opposition to each other, who are living what they are writing about." According to Forbes, in less than two months from the launch date, xoJane.com established itself as one of the "Top 10 Lifestyle Websites for Women." Pratt served as editor-in-chief with Emily McCombs as executive editor, Mandy Stadtmiller as editor-at-large, and Lesley Kinzel as deputy editor. She launched a British sister site, xojane.co.uk, in June 2012, with Rebecca Holman as editor.

xoJane and xoVain were acquired by Time Inc. from Pratt and SAY Media in 2015. In December 2016, Time indicated that it would be folding xoJane into InStyle, following reports that Pratt was leaving Time and looking for a new owner for her web properties.

As of 2017 xoJane content and articles are unavailable and the xoJane site redirects to HelloGiggles, a former Time, Inc. property now owned by Dotdash Meredith.

== Personal life ==
Pratt and actor/writer Andrew Shaifer have a daughter, Charlotte Jane (born December 2002). She was pregnant with twins, due in the summer of 2005, but she miscarried both that April.

== In popular culture ==
An episode of MTV animated series Daria parodied Pratt through the character of Val, youth-obsessed editor of Val magazine.

An episode of Girls featured a character with a similar appearance as Pratt named Jame, an editor of a confessional blog similar to a regular column on xoJane.
