= Aircard =

Aircard, Air card or AirCard may refer to:

- AirH”Card petit (RH2000 and CFE-02), a series of PHS/PIAFS-enabled wireless CompactFlash cards by DDI-Pocket
- Sierra Wireless AirCard, a series of wireless cell phone ExpressCards by Sierra Wireless
- Netgear AirCard, a family of wireless networking products by Netgear
- PQI Air Card, a Wi-Fi-enabled SD card manufactured by PQI, similar to Eye-Fi cards etc.
- Mobile broadband modem, a type of mobile broadband modems

== See also ==
- Air Travel Card
