= Christopher Alden =

Christopher Alden may refer to:

- Christopher Alden (director) (born 1949), American opera director
- Chris Alden (born 1969), American entrepreneur and co-founder of Red Herring magazine
