= Michelle Slatalla =

- Born: Elmhurst, Illinois, U.S.
- Education: Indiana University Bloomington; Columbia University
- Occupation: Columnist
- Spouse: Josh Quittner (m. 1988)
- Children: 3

Michelle Slatalla is an American journalist and humorist. Currently, she writes a monthly column for the Wall Street Journal about interior design. Previously, she was a columnist for The New York Times, TIME magazine, Real Simple, and a reporter for Newsday. In 2012 she created the outdoor design blog Gardenista, and was the editor in chief of the site for seven years. She has written several books, including Gardenista: The Definitive Guide to Stylish Outdoor Spaces and The Town on Beaver Creek: The Story of a Lost Kentucky Community.

Slatalla launched Gardenista in 2012 as an offshoot of the remodeling blog Remodelista, ten years after meeting Remodelista founding editor Julie Carlson through a mutual friend. TIME magazine named Gardenista to its list of the year's "25 Best Blogs" in 2012.

== Early life and education ==
Slatalla was born in Elmhurst, Illinois, a suburb of Chicago. She has three younger brothers.

She graduated from Indiana University Bloomington in 1984 with a Bachelor's degree in Journalism and English, and later attended Columbia University, from which she graduated in 1985 with an Master's degree in Literature.

== Career ==
After graduating from Columbia University in 1985, Slatalla was hired as a reporter for Newsday.

Throughout the following decade, she co-wrote several works of fiction primarily focused on the internet with her husband Josh Quittner, including Mother's Day: A Novel of Suspense, Flame War: A Cyberthriller, Masters of Deception (about the eponymous New York-based hackers the Masters of Deception), Shoofly Pie to Die, and Speeding the Net: The Inside Story of Netscape and How It Challenged Microsoft.

In 1998, she was hired as a humor columnist by The New York Times to cover the internet. Her work largely explored the intersection of technology and her home life through a comedic lens. Slatalla's column was initially called "User's Guide," and was then retitled "Online Shopper" from October 1999 through May 2007. It was then briefly renamed "Cyberfamilias" until October 2008, when it was retitled, "Wife/Mother/Worker/Spy." Slatalla's column had a large fan base as well as select critics, including gossip blog Gawker, which criticized Slatalla's humorous approach to detailing personal family interactions.

Slatalla has also contributed as a columnist to TIME magazine and Real Simple.

In 2006, she wrote The Town on Beaver Creek: The Story of a Lost Kentucky Community, a humorous narrative about Martin, a century-old eastern Kentucky town that was bulldozed in 2004 for a federal flood-relief project, where her ancestors previously lived.

=== Gardenista ===
Slatalla launched Gardenista with Julie Carlson in 2012 as an offshoot of the remodeling blog Remodelista, ten years after meeting Carlson (Remodelista founder and Editor in Chief) through a mutual friend. Gardenista's stated mission is to serve as the definitive guide to stylish outdoor spaces. TIME magazine named Gardenista to its list of the year's 25 Best Blogs in 2012. Today, Gardenista has over 5,000 posts, including a section on garden design, DIY guides, garden visits, and reviews of and suggestions for gardening products.

Slatalla wrote Gardenista: The Definitive Guide to Stylish Outdoor Spaces, which was published in October 2016. The book features Slatalla's own home garden in Mill Valley, California, along with twelve other gardens, including that of Manhattan-based designer and antiques dealer John Derian.

== Personal life ==
Slatalla lives in Mill Valley, with her husband Joshua Quittner. They have three children, including Ella Quittner who is also a journalist. Slatalla's Mill Valley home garden is featured in Gardenista: The Definitive Guide to Stylish Outdoor Spaces, including in the first chapter. Slatalla's home garden was photographed for The New York Times.

== Books ==
- Gardenista: The Definitive Guide to Stylish Outdoor Spaces (2016, Artisan Books) ISBN 1-579-65652-8
- The Town on Beaver Creek: The Story of a Lost Kentucky Community (2006, Random House) ISBN 0-375-50905-4
- Speeding the Net: The Inside Story of Netscape and How It Challenged Microsoft (1998, Atlantic Monthly Press) ISBN 0-871-13709-7
- Shoofly Pie to Die by Joshua Quittner and Michelle Slatalla (1992 St Martins Pr) ISBN 0-312-06943-X
- Masters of Deception by Joshua Quittner and Michelle Slatalla (1999 Library Binding) ISBN 0-7857-8744-5
- Flame War: A Cyberthriller by Joshua Quittner and Michelle Slatalla (1998 Harper Perennial; Reprint edition) ISBN 0-380-72586-X
- Mother's Day: A Novel of Suspense by Joshua Quittner and Michelle Slatalla (1993 St Martins Pr; 1st ed edition) ISBN 0-312-08850-7
