= YourMechanic =

American automotive repair company

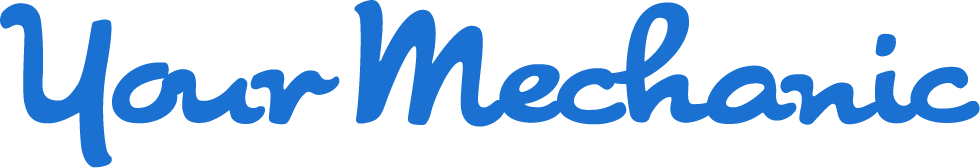
- Website type: Private
- Founded: January 2012; 14 years ago
- Headquarters: Mountain View, California, {{{location_country}}}
- Area served: U.S.
- Founders: Art Agrawal; Dongyi Liao
- Key people: Anthony Rodio (CEO); John Wall (CTO); Rajat Agarwal (VP of Engineering)
- Industry: Automotive
- Website: yourmechanic.com

YourMechanic is an American company that provides mobile automotive repair and maintenance services to vehicle owners at their location, such as their home or office.

The privately held startup company was originally based in Mountain View, California before being acquired in June 2022 by Wrench, a mobile automotive repair startup company based in Seattle, Washington.

YourMechanic currently operates in 2,363 cities within the United States, offering 719 unique services performed by certified mechanics.

Most mechanics are certified by National Institute for Automotive Service Excellence (ASE) and some are certified by similar organizations and/or have dealership or factory training. A new customer can review mechanics’ certifications during the booking process in addition to experience, work history, jobs completed for other car owners, fees paid by other car owners, and customers ratings and reviews. Mechanics undergo background, criminal, and reference checks.

== History ==
- In 2012, Art Agrawal (Co-founder) and Dongyi Liao (CTO) founded YourMechanic.
- In September 2012, the company raised $1.8 million in seed funding from venture firms and investors including Andreessen Horowitz, SV Angel, Crunch Fund, Promus Ventures, Greylock Partners, DFJ, Lerer Ventures, PG Ventures, Ashton Kutcher, Jawed Karim, Dave Gilboa, Justin Waldron, Joshua Schachter, Hector Hulian, Paige Craig, Mark Friedgan, Alex Goldstein, Sam Angus, Kevin Freedman, Jeremy Wenokur and Rob Wang.
- In September 2012, the company won the TechCrunch Battlefield Disrupt San Francisco competition against other finalists Saya, Lit Motors, Prior Knowledge, Zumper, Gyft and Expert Labs.
- In March 2016, the company announced $24 million in funding provided by SoftBank Capital, Lerer Hippeau Ventures, Data Point Capital, Andreessen Horowitz, SAIC, Verizon Ventures, American Family Insurance, PG Ventures, Promus Ventures, and Silicon Valley Bank, bringing its total funding to $32 million.
- In late 2016, Anthony Rodio joined YourMechanic as CEO and President, leading a shift in the company's culture, operational strategy and management, while creating a significant decline in customer quality.
- In June 2022, After a series of lawsuits, fatalities and marketplace mechanics safety issues, YourMechanic was acquired by Wrench, a Seattle-based mobile automotive repair startup, to further expand a vehicle service network supported by previously acquired companies, Lemon Squad, Fiix, and Otobots.
