= Nobuhiro Seki =

Japanese businessman and entrepreneur

Nobuhiro Seki is a Japanese businessman and entrepreneur.

Seki received a B.S. degree in engineering from the University of Tokyo and an MBA from Tepper School of Business at Carnegie Mellon University. He served as Executive Vice President and General Manager of Japan at Six Apart from December 2003 to January 2011. Seki is currently the president and CEO of Six Apart, a subsidiary of Infocom Corporation and the developer of Movable Type.
