= Mena Grabowski Trott =

American blogger

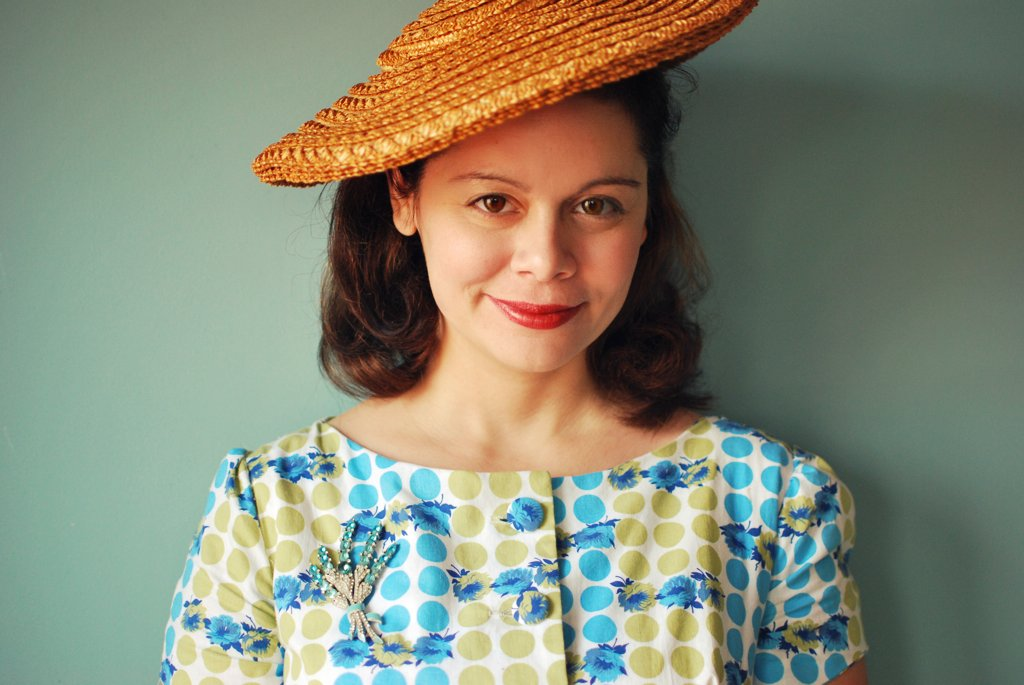
- Mena Trott
- Born: Mena Grabowski; 16 September 1977 (age 49)
- Occupation: Blogger
- Known for: Co-founder of Six Apart, creator of Movable Type and TypePad

Mena Grabowski Trott (born Philomena Frances Grabowski on 16 September 1977, now Mena Grabowski Lazar) is an American blogger and businesswoman known as co-founder of Six Apart, the company that created Movable Type and TypePad blogging platforms.

== Career ==
Trott serves as president of Six Apart, a company she cofounded with her ex-husband Benjamin Trott. The company 's name originates from the fact that Trott and Benjamin Trott were born six days apart.

She remains on the Board of Directors after the merger which resulted in the formation of Say Media. Trott started publishing her blog, dollarshort.org in 2001.

Trott also created "The Sew Weekly", a blog documenting her challenges in making weekly dresses for a year. The blog encouraged people to "sew one garment a week". Each week, Mena developed a theme, such as "tickled pink" (garments made from pink fabric) and "celebrating mothers" (garments which our mothers wore). That blog project appears to have come to an end as of December 2012.

Movable Type was originally developed by Mena Trott and Benjamin Trott during a period of unemployment in late 2001 for Mena's personal blogging use.

== Recognition ==
Trott was named one of the People of the Year by PC Magazine in 2004. That same year, she was named a member of the TR100 by MIT Technology Review magazine, as one of the top 100 innovators in the world under the age of 35.
