= Julie Carlson =

American Writer, Businesswoman

- Born: Julie Anna Carlson; November 24, 1960 (age 64); Wellfleet, Massachusetts
- Education: Brown University (BA-English)
- Occupation(s): Writer, Businesswoman
- Years active: 2007–present
- Known for: Co-Founder of Remodelista; Co-Founder of Gardenista
- Title: Editor-in-Chief, Remodelista
- Spouse: Josh Groves (m. 1990)
- Parents: Sten Carlson (father); Jocelyn Carlson Baltzell (mother)
- Relatives: Justina Carlson (sister)

Julie Carlson (born November 24, 1960) is an American writer and co-founder of interior design and lifestyle website Remodelista and outdoor spaces and garden design website Gardenista operated by holding company Remodelista LLC, owned by Carlson and husband Josh Groves. Carlson is the Editor-in-Chief of Remodelista and author of Remodelista: A Manual for the Considered Home (2013) and Remodelista: The Organized Home: Simple, Stylish Storage Ideas for All Over the House (2017).

== Early life and education ==
Julie Carlson grew up in Wellfleet, Massachusetts. Her mother, Jocelyn Carlson Balzell, was a graduate of Harvard Graduate School of Education as well as a Fulbright Scholar who became the NYC intellectual sets go-to luncheon organizer as the associate director of the New York Institute for the Humanities at New York University where she was fired for inviting Hillary Rodham Clinton to one of their lunch meetings. Carlson's stepfather, Edward Digby Baltzell, was an eminent professor at the University of Pennsylvania, and was credited with popularizing the acronym WASP in his book The Protestant Establishment: Aristocracy and Caste in America. Carlson's father, Sten Carlson, went to Yale and Columbia before becoming one of the top-producing fishermen on Cape Cod. During one excursion in the waters off Cuba, his boat was seized by the Cuban Navy possibly thinking he was a spy.

Carlson attended Brown University, from which she graduated in 1983 with a Bachelor of Arts in English.

== Career ==
Carlson worked at Institute for Architecture and Urban Studies before beginning her writing career on the editorial team of The New Yorker as a copy editor. Subsequently, she became a food and style editor at San Francisco Magazine and has been featured in various publications including Food & Wine and The Washington Post.

In 2007, Carlson co-founded Remodelista with Francesca Connolly, Janet Hall, and Sarah Lonsdale to provide an online sourcebook for users planning a home renovation or remodel with the goal of furnishing rooms with a mix of classics, vintage finds and modernist pieces.

In 2011, Remodelista was acquired by San Francisco company SAY Media.

In 2012, Carlson co-founded Gardenista, an outdoor spaces and garden design website with former New York Times columnist Michelle Slatalla under SAY Media's ownership.

In 2015, Carlson and husband Josh Groves bought Remodelista and Gardenista from SAY Media for an undisclosed amount.

In 2016, Remodelista and Gardenista were acquired by Realtor.com, operated by the News Corporation subsidiary Move, Inc. At the time of sale, the two sites reportedly received 1.5 million readers per month.

In 2017, Carlson launched another companion site, The Organized Home, in conjunction with the publication of the book Remodelista: The Organized Home.

In 2019, Carlson and husband Josh Groves bought back Remodelista, Gardenista and The Organized Home from Realtor.com and currently operate the sites as part of holding company Remodelista LLC of which Groves is CEO. Few details surrounding the deal were released but they reported that the combined readership of the sites reached 1.7 million users per month.

== Books ==
In October 2013, Remodelista: A Manual For The Considered Home (ISBN 978-1579655365), written by Julie Carlson with photography by Matthew Williams, was published by Artisan. The book includes tours of homes and advice on how to recreate one's own space in a similar style. Academy Awards winner Julianne Moore wrote the foreword to the book.

In November 2017, Artisan published Remodelista: The Organized Home (ISBN 978-1579656935), written by Julie Carlson and Margot Guralnick with photography by Matthew Williams.

== Personal life ==
Carlson lives in Brooklyn Heights and Mill Valley, California, with her husband, Josh Groves, who is the CEO of Remodelista.
