= Gardenista =

Outdoor & Garden Design Website

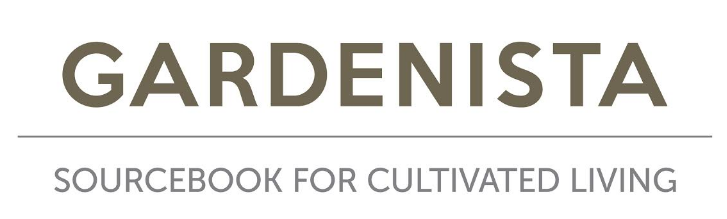
- Website type: Outdoor & Garden Design
- Available in: English
- Founded: May 22, 2011; 15 years ago
- Headquarters: New York, New York, U.S.
- Owner: Remodelista LLC
- Founders: Julie Carlson, Michelle Slatalla
- Editor: Fan Winston
- Key people: Josh Groves (CEO)
- Website: https://www.gardenista.com/
- Current status: Active

Gardenista is an outdoor spaces and garden design website operated by Remodelista LLC. It was founded in 2011 by Julie Carlson and Michelle Slatalla initially as a section of Remodelista, and then as a separate entity in 2012. The company is based in New York City.

== History ==
Gardenista, originally a section of Remodelista, was launched as an independent website on May 22, 2012, under the ownership of SAY Media with New York Times columnist Michelle Slatalla as Editor-in-Chief. Gardenista launched as a part of SAY Media's "Living channels", which at the time of launch was reportedly reaching 34 million consumers in the U.S. per month.

In 2015, Julie Carlson, Founder and Editor-in-Chief of parent website Remodelista and husband Josh Groves bought Gardenista and Remodelista from SAY Media for an undisclosed amount.

In 2016, Gardenista and Remodelista was acquired by Realtor.com, operated by the News Corporation subsidiary Move, Inc. At the time of sale, the two sites reportedly received 1.5 million readers per month.

In June 2019, Gardenista announced that it's once again independently owned along with sister sites Remodelista and Organized Home after three years as part of News Corporation subsidiary Realtor.com. According to the announcement, the transition was due to a strategy restructure following Realtor.com's $210 million acquisition of real-estate leads generation platform OpCity. Few details surrounding the deal were released but they reported that the combined readership of the sites reached 1.7 million users per month. Shortly after the deal Michelle Slatalla stepped down as Editor-in-Chief and was replaced by Fan Winston.

== Site features ==
Gardenista is a "Sourcebook For Cultivated Outdoor Living", which includes how-to content, DIY posts and guides on garden design. SAY Media said at launch it aims to offer suggestions for the best new gardening tools and outdoor products, from garden furniture to house numbers and paint colors for the exterior, and will showcase beautiful garden destinations all over the world.

Similar to its parent website Remodelista, Gardenista has an invitation-only directory of landscape architects, landscape designers, and other outdoor design professionals, as well as an annual “Considered Design Awards” contest. Guest judges for Gardenista's Considered Design Awards have included Sheila Bridges and Deborah Needleman.

Gardenista also has a shop that curates an assortment of products including editor favorites, garden-related tools, as well as a catalogue of plants and seeds. All items are ordered from Gardenista suppliers.

Gardenista's Instagram account received recognition from The Irish Times as one of the Eight Best Instagram Gardeners to Follow in 2018.

== Books ==
In October 2016, Gardenista: The Definitive Guide to Outdoor Spaces (ISBN 978-1579656522), written by Michelle Slatalla with photography by Matthew Williams, was published by Artisan. The book includes features on 13 gardens (including that of Slatalla), case studies on classic gardening trends, 100 favorite every-day gardening objects, and tips for home gardeners.
