= XoJane =

American online women's magazine

xoJane
- Website type: Online magazine; Women's magazine
- Available in: English
- Owner: Time Inc.
- Creator: Jane Pratt
- Website: www.xojane.com
- Launched: 2011
- Current status: Defunct

xoJane (also known as xoJane.com) was an American online magazine from 2011 to 2016 geared toward women and founded by Jane Pratt and co-published by Say Media. Pratt was the founding editor of Sassy and Jane magazines.

In less than two months from the launch date, xoJane established itself as one of Forbes' "Top 10 Lifestyle Websites for Women". Pratt served as editor-in-chief with Emily McCombs as executive editor, Lesley Kinzel as deputy editor and Mandy Stadtmiller as editor-at-large.

Pratt launched a British sister site, xojane.co.uk, in June 2012, with Rebecca Holman as editor. In March 2013, xoJane launched spinoff beauty site xoVain.

xoJane and xoVain were acquired by Time Inc. from Pratt and SAY Media in 2015. In December 2016, Time indicated that it would be folding xoJane into InStyle, following reports that Pratt was leaving Time and looking for a new owner for her web properties. In 2016, a statement from Time said that the site would redirect to InStyle.com. As of 2017 xoJane content and articles are unavailable and the xoJane site redirects to the Time, Inc. site HelloGiggles.
