= Chris Alden =

American entrepreneur

Christopher J. Alden
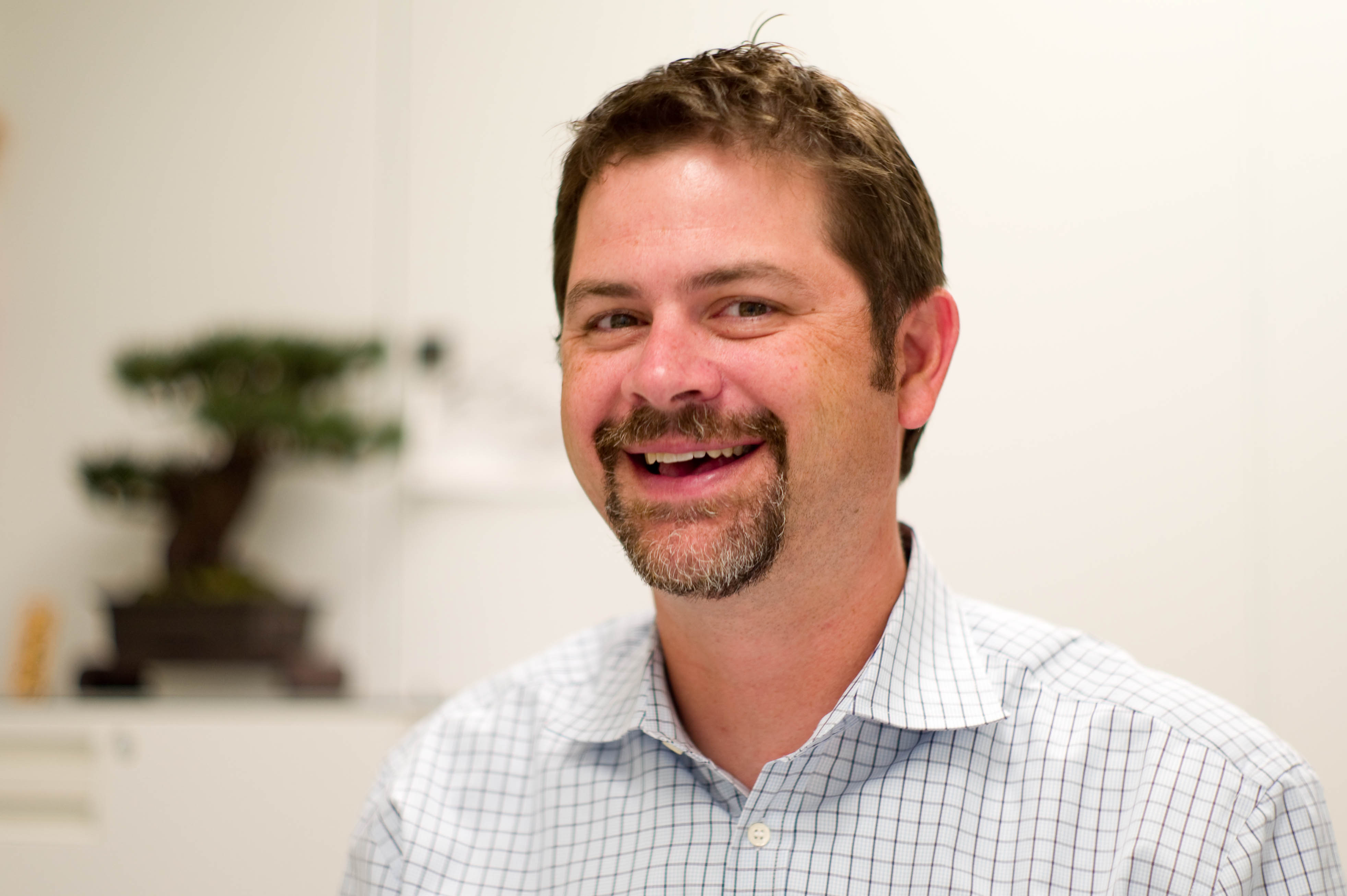
- Christopher J. Alden
- Education: Dartmouth College (BA)
- Known for: Co-founder of Red Herring

Christopher J. Alden is an American entrepreneur best known as a co-founder of Red Herring, a magazine focused on the business of technology, and Rojo.com, an early web-based RSS reader. Alden was chairman and chief executive officer of the blogging company Six Apart, Ltd. from September 2006 to October 2010 when Six Apart was sold to VideoEgg, forming SAY Media. He is a venture partner of Tugboat Ventures.
