= Realtor.com =

Real estate website

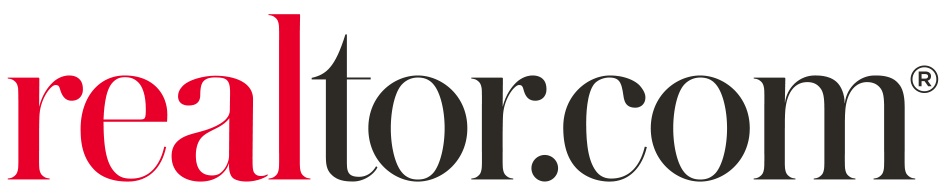
- Realtor.com Logo

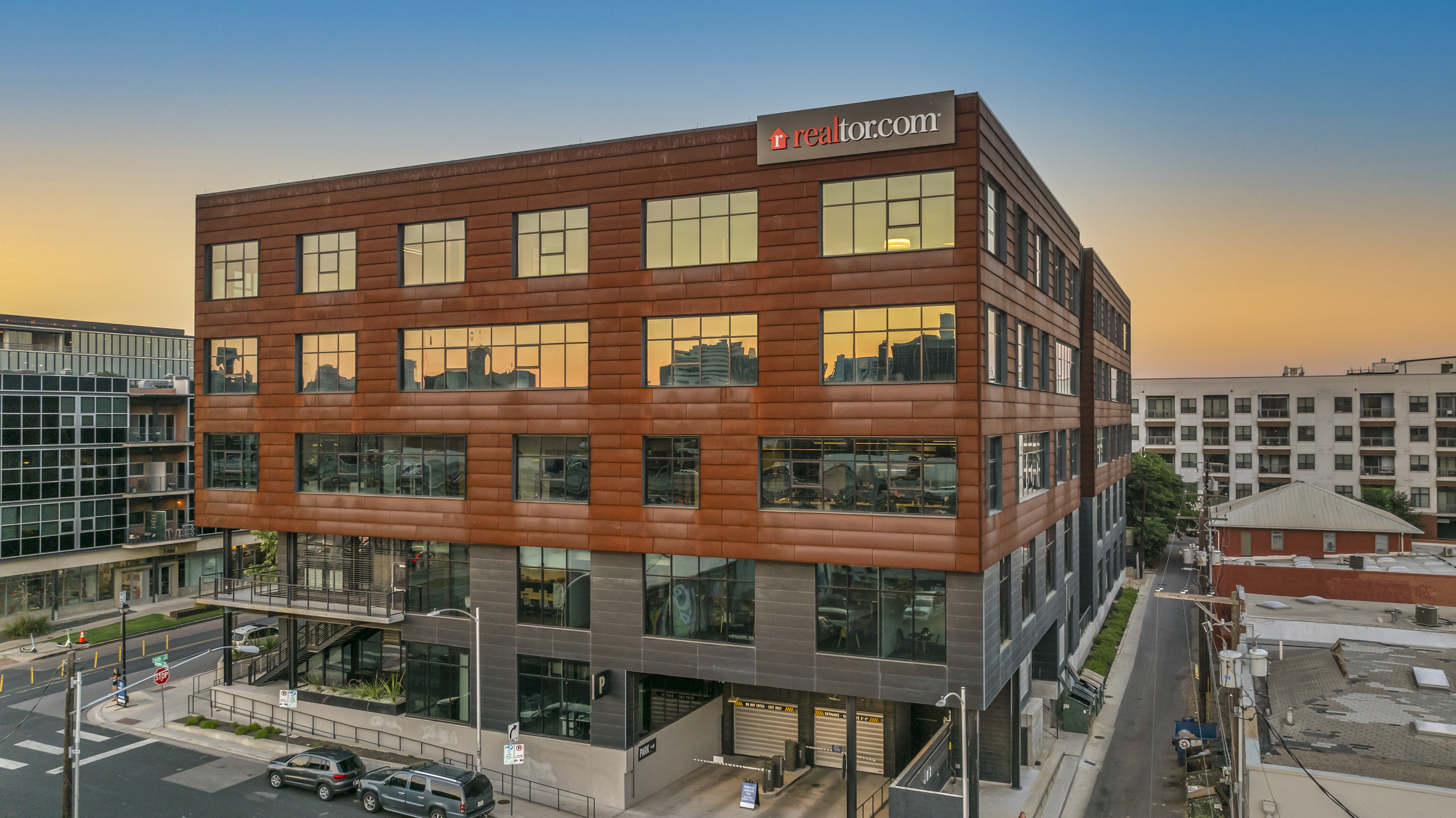
- Realtor.com's headquarters in Austin, Texas
- Industry: Real estate
- Founded: 1995
- Headquarters: Austin, Texas, United States
- Key people: Damian Eales (CEO); Bryan Charap (CFO); Bryan Ellis (CRO); Mickey Neuberger (CMO); Karthikeyan Janakiraman (CTO); Kat Koutsantonis (Chief People Officer)
- Website: www.realtor.com

Realtor.com is an American real estate listings website operated by the News Corp subsidiary Move, Inc. and based in Austin, Texas. It is the second most visited real estate listings website in the United States as of 2021, with over 100 million monthly active users.

The site launched as the Realtor Information Network in 1995, as a closed network for members of the National Association of Realtors. It relaunched in 1996 as a public website displaying property listings. Since then, Realtor.com claims to be the largest real estate website in the United States, and in 2016 was valued at $2.5 billion by Morgan Stanley.

== Operations ==
Realtor.com is operated by the real estate network Move, Inc., which is owned by News Corp. Ryan O'Hara was chief executive officer (CEO) of both realtor.com and Move until June 2019.

Following the announcement of O'Hara's departure, News Corp's President of Global Digital Real Estate Tracey Fellows was named acting CEO in June 2019. David Doctorow was named CEO in January 2020. In June 2023, Doctorow was succeeded by Damian Eales as CEO.

The website is licensed to operate by the National Association of Realtors (NAR), the real estate industry's largest trade association. The company's business model is built around selling referral-based solutions, leads, and advertising to agents, brokers, and others in the real estate industry. Realtor.com covers 80 countries.

== History ==
=== Early history and public listing ===
Realtor.com first launched in 1995 as the Realtor Information Network (RIN), which at that time was a closed network providing proprietary information to members of NAR.

In 1996, the hosting site became public, allowing any Internet users to search for property listings, and expanded with the addition of Regional Multiple Listing Service (RMLS) listings in August. RIN grew from 32,000 property listings in December 1995 to nearly 400,000 properties by October 1996.

The site was relaunched with the name "Spot Realtor.com" at the same realtor.com domain name in November 1996. The site's management was assumed by a company called RealSelect, in a new partnership with NAR, funded by investment from venture capital firms. RealSelect later changed its name to Homestore, and continued to operate the realtor.com site with NAR as a partner.

Starting in 1997, Realtor.com became the exclusive online real estate listings source for several companies, including USA Today, NBC, and America Online (AOL). Realtor.com also entered into a partnership with Better Homes and Gardens Real Estate Service, beginning in 1998.

With more than 1.3 million listings by 1999, Realtor.com had become the largest website for real estate listings, and expanded services to include virtual tours of properties.

Homestore went public in August 1999, raising $140 million in the process. NAR retained a significant equity position, but Homestore negotiated agreements with multiple listing services and brokerages to secure direct feeds of listings.

=== News Corp era ===
News Corp purchased Realtor.com's parent company, now called Move, for $950 million in September 2014. According to comScore, Realtor.com was receiving 34.1 million unique visitors per month at the time. New partnerships were formed with Airbnb, to focus on encouraging potential home buyers to stay in neighborhoods of interest to them; and with Yelp, to provide users with information about listed properties' neighborhood amenities.

Originally located in San Jose, California, the company moved to Santa Clara in 2016.

Move acquired interior design and lifestyle website Remodelista and outdoor spaces and garden design website Gardenista in 2016 as part of Realtor.com's marketing strategy. At the time of purchase, the two sites represented 1.5 million monthly readers. In June, 2019 the company sold back the websites to founder Julie Carlson and husband Josh Groves and are now independently operated by Remodelista LLC.

As of 2016, Realtor.com claimed to display 97 percent of residential properties for sale in the United States, and reportedly received 36.7 million unique monthly visitors. The company was valued by Morgan Stanley at $2.5 billion.

Features for augmented reality and image recognition in listings were added to the Realtor.com mobile apps in January 2017. Also, the site began offering 3D tours from Matterport on its iOS app, and began offering the same technology on its website and Android app.

Move acquired Opcity, the Austin, Texas-based real estate technology company, for $210 million in 2018. The company, which developed a platform that uses artificial intelligence and machine learning to match potential home buyers with agents, continued to operate as an independent business until being integrated in 2019–2020.

In 2018, Realtor.com introduced Local Expert, a digital marketing service for targeting ads to agents and prospective buyers on both the company's website and Facebook. Local Expert was expanded in 2019 to allow ad purchases for searches at the city level in addition to the ZIP Code level.

Another marketing product, Market Reach, launched in early 2020. During 2019 and early 2020, Realtor.com added a number of features to improve search options, including a commute time filter, noise overlay map, and automated value model comparisons.

In July 2020, Realtor.com introduced Sellers Marketplace to help consumers with iBuying by providing homeowners with information for comparing selling options.

In August 2020, Realtor.com launched a digital tool to help people assess the risk of flooding to a home over the course of a 30-year mortgage. In May 2022, Realtor.com added wildfire risk data to the online tool. Both integrations were a result of collaboration with the First Street Foundation, a nonprofit research and technology organization that uses data and technology to predict climate-related risks.

As of mid-2020, Realtor.com was receiving approximately 68 million unique users per month The same year, Move purchased software company Avail. Avail provides tools used by landlords such as creating and marketing listings as well as collecting rent and maintenance requests.

In 2021, it was reported as the number one real estate listings website and second most visited.

In June 2022, Move acquired UpNest.com to expand its seller strategy. UpNest algorithmically matches real estate customers with multiple agents in their area. Since UpNest's launch in 2013 approximately 1 million agent proposals have been submitted on the UpNest platform. In 2018 and 2019, UpNest was ranked on Deloitte's Technology Fast 500 as #85 and #116, respectively.

On February 10, 2025, it was reported that Realtor.com had relocated its headquarters from Santa Clara to Austin, Texas.

== Marketing ==
Elizabeth Banks became a spokesperson for Realtor.com in 2015, appearing in the company's YouTube series targeting millennials buying their first home. Her first commercial for the company was directed by Fred Savage. A subsequent campaign, "The Home of Home Search", launched in April 2018.

Realtor.com's 2021 advertising campaign, "Homes for Every Home Buyer" uses the tagline "to each their home". One ad features rapper Big Boi in "Our First Big Boi House", which depicts first-time homebuyers of color and celebrates Black homeownership. The website's advertising campaigns have been recognized by Adweek, the Online Marketing Media and Advertising (OMMA) Awards, and the Webby Awards for their creativity, use of talent, and digital advertising.

In 2025, Realtor.com launched the "Nearly Home" campaign featuring country singer and actress Reba McEntire.
