= Move (company) =

Real estate listing company

Move, Inc.
- Type: Joint venture
- Industry: Real estate
- Founded: 1993; 33 years ago
- Headquarters: Austin, Texas, United States
- Key people: Damian Eales (CEO); Bryan Charap (CFO); Bryan Ellis (CRO); Mickey Neuberger (CMO); Kat Koutsantonis (Chief People Officer); Karthikeyan Janakiraman (CTO)
- Brands: Avail; ListHub; Move.com; Moving.com; Realtor.com; Realtor.com for Professionals; UpNest
- Revenue: $227 million (2013)
- Owners: News Corp (80%); REA Group (20%)
- Number of employees: 913 (2013)
- Subsidiaries: Move Sales
- Website: www.move.com

Move, Inc. is a real estate listing company based in Austin, Texas. The company operates the Move Network of real estate websites, the largest of which is Realtor.com. Move has a longstanding partnership with the National Association of Realtors for operating Realtor.com.

== Operations ==
Move was established in Delaware under the name InfoTouch Corporation in 1993. The company was based in Santa Clara, California until February 2025, when it moved the company headquarters to Austin, Texas. The company operates Move.com and Realtor.com. Move owns the listing syndication and reporting platform ListHub. The company also operates Avail (following its acquisition in 2020), Moving.com, Relocation.com, and UpNest (following its acquisition in 2022).

Tracey Fellows was named acting chief executive officer (CEO) of Move and Realtor.com in June 2019. David Doctorow was named CEO in January 2020. Bryan Charap has served as chief financial officer since 2015. In 2020, Move named Mickey Neuberger chief marketing officer. In 2022, Bryan Ellis became chief revenue officer. Doctorow was replaced by Damian Eales as CEO in 2023.

== History ==
=== Homestore ===
Stuart Wolff founded the online real estate company Homestore Inc. in 1996. He established a partnership with the National Association of Realtors, and his company, RealSelect Inc., operated Realtor.com. Under the agreement, the National Association of Realtors had a small stake in RealSelect.

The company went public as Homestore.com, Inc. in 1999, and was traded on the NASDAQ stock exchange. In October 2000, Homestore agreed to purchase Move.com from Cendant Corp. for $761 million in stock, leaving Cendant with a 15 percent stake. In 2001, Homestore operated the websites HomeBuilder.com, HomeFair.com, Realtor.com, HomeWrite.com, and SpringStreet.com, acquired HomeBid, and owned the software Top Producer as well as Wyldfyre technologies. In August, the company purchased iPlace Inc., for $150 million.

During the rise of the dot-com bubble, Wolff was convicted of insider trading and falsifying revenue results, and several additional executives received prison sentences for inflating earnings. Homestore's 2000 and 2001 financial reports required refiling, and the U.S. Securities and Exchange Commission investigated the company in 2002. Wolff's conviction was overturned on appeal in 2008, but he eventually plea bargained for a sentence of 3–5 years. Wolff resigned as CEO in January 2002, and was replaced by a new management team.

Homestore.com, Inc. changed its name to Homestore, Inc. in 2002, then rebranded as Move, Inc. in 2006. The company's stock symbol was changed from "HOMS" to "MOVE", and the Move.com website was launched in May 2006.

On February 22, 2006 Homestore, Inc. announced the acquisition of Moving.com from TMP Directional Marketing, LLC. Moving.com provides consumers with offers from qualified movers, truck rental, and self-storage providers, as well as access to a sophisticated mortgage rates directory. Mirus Capital Advisors represented TMP Directional Marketing and Moving.com in the transaction.

=== Move, Inc. ===
Move acquired the company Threewide, which operated the real estate listing service ListHub, for $13 million in September 2010. Move retained ListHub as its own separate brand. Move launched an online mortgage offering called MortgageMatch.com in December 2010, targeting first time home buyers and those looking to refinance, then acquired the social search platform SocialBios in 2011. In 2013, Move reported $227 million in revenue and $600,000 in profit. Move ended its three-year partnership with AOL real estate in December 2013, and its decade-long partnership with MSN Real Estate in July 2014.

In September 2014, News Corp agreed to purchase Move for $950 million, marking the former company's largest acquisition to date. Move operated the third most-trafficked website network for U.S. listings at the time. Ownership of Move is shared 80/20 between News Corp and REA Group, respectively. The deal was endorsed by the National Association of Realtors, which licensed the Realtor.com URL to Move and allowed the company to operate the site. This agreement continued after the deal closed in November. In 2015, Move relocated its headquarters from San Jose to Santa Clara.

Move acquired the document and transaction management provider Reesio, which specializes in residential real estate, in October 2015. The financial terms were not disclosed, and Reesio's four founders joined Move's team. In 2016, Zillow paid $130 million to Move and the National Association of Realtors to settle a lawsuit over trade secrets, following its employment of two individuals who had held executive roles at Move. Move sold its lead-generation company TigerLeads to Commissions Inc., a customer relationship management system provider, in December.

Move acquired interior design and lifestyle website Remodelista and outdoor spaces and garden design website Gardenista in 2016 as part of Realtor.com's marketing strategy. At the time of purchase, the two sites represented 1.5 million monthly readers. In June, 2019 the company sold back the websites to founder Julie Carlson and husband Josh Groves and are now independently operated by Remodelista LLC.

Move acquired Opcity, the Austin, Texas-based real estate technology company, for $210 million in 2018. The company, which developed a platform that uses artificial intelligence and machine learning to match potential home buyers with agents, initially continued to operate as an independent business but was later integrated into Realtor.com.

In 2020, Move acquired Chicago-based Avail, a platform with online tools and education content for landlords. Move sold the customer relationship management platform Top Producer to Constellation Real Estate Group in March 2021. The following year it acquired UpNest, a platform that connects home sellers and buyers with local agents competing for business.

In 2025, Move acquired Zenlist, a real estate technology company.
