= Six Apart =

Software company

Six Apart, Ltd.
- Native name: シックス・アパート株式会社
- Romanized name: Shikkusu Apāto kabushiki gaisha
- Type: Private KK
- Industry: Software & Programming
- Predecessor: "Old" (San Francisco, California-based) Six Apart Ltd. (2001–2011)
- Founded: September 2001; 25 years ago in San Francisco, California, U.S. (original); January 2011; 15 years ago in Tokyo, Japan (current incarnation)
- Founders: Benjamin Trott; Mena Grabowski Trott
- Headquarters: Tokyo, Japan
- Key people: Nobuhiro Seki, CEO
- Products: Movable Type; Zenback; TypePad
- Owner: Employee owned (2016–present)
- Parent: Infocom (Teijin) (2011–2016)
- Website: www.sixapart.com www.sixapart.jp

Six Apart Ltd. (6A) is a software company known for creating the Movable Type blogware, TypePad blog hosting service, and Vox (the blogging platform). The company also is the former owner of LiveJournal. Six Apart is headquartered in Tokyo. The name is a reference to the six-day age difference between its formerly married co-founders, Ben and Mena Trott.

== History ==
The company was founded in September 2001 after Ben, during a period of unemployment, wrote what became Movable Type to allow Mena to easily produce her weblog. When version 1.0 was put on the web, it was downloaded over 100 times in the first hour.

=== 2003–2006 ===
In 2003, Six Apart received initial venture capital funding from a group led by Joi Ito and his Neoteny Co., which allowed the company to hire additional employees, acquire a French weblog publishing company, and unveil plans for what was to become its hosted weblog publishing system, TypePad. In 2004, Six Apart completed a second round of funding with August Capital, which allowed it to make acquisitions of other companies. In January 2005, Six Apart purchased Danga Interactive, parent company of LiveJournal, from owner Brad Fitzpatrick, who was named Six Apart's chief architect. In March 2006, Six Apart announced the acquisition of the SplashBlog camera phone blogging service. June 2006 saw the release of their new Web 2.0 blogging platform, Vox.

Its CEO was Chris Alden. Prominent weblogger Anil Dash joined the company in 2003, as did former head of Wired Digital Andrew Anker. Six Apart's board of directors consisted of Barak Berkowitz, Mena Trott, David Marquardt, David Hornik, Reid Hoffman, and Jun Makihara.

On September 6, 2006, Six Apart bought Rojo.com. President Chris Alden became executive vice president of Six Apart and general manager of Movable Type. CTO Aaron Emigh became executive vice president and general manager of core technologies.

=== 2007 ===
On September 15, 2007, chairman and chief executive Barak Berkowitz stepped aside and was replaced by Chris Alden, who had run the company's professional software unit.

On December 2, 2007, Six Apart announced it was selling LiveJournal to SUP Fabrik, a Russian media company that had licensed the LiveJournal brand and software for use in Russia.

=== 2008 ===
On April 21, 2008, Six Apart said it had acquired Apperceptive, a New York social media agency, as part of its new strategy. It declined to disclose financial terms of the deal. It also partnered with advertising agency Adify. Just as in an advertising network, bloggers were able to sign up and participate in advertising campaigns managed by Six Apart.

On December 1, 2008, Six Apart announced the acquisition of micro blogging website Pownce. The Pownce website was shut down on December 15. The key developers of Pownce (Leah Culver and Mike Malone) stayed on at Six Apart through early 2010, with Pownce technology being integrated into TypePad and TypePad Conversations.

=== 2010 ===
On September 2, 2010 Six Apart announced that they would be shutting down their blogging/social networking site Vox with a final termination date set for September 30, 2010.

Beginning from September 15, 2010 Vox users would not be able to post new blog posts.

On September 22, Six Apart announced its intention to join forces with VideoEgg to create a modern media company called SAY Media.

=== 2011 ===
On January 21, 2011, SAY Media announced that it was selling the Six Apart brand and the worldwide Movable Type business to Infocom, a Japanese information technology company. As a result of this transaction, the headquarters of Six Apart is now Tokyo, Japan.

Nobuhiro Seki, who was general manager of Six Apart, K.K. prior to this announcement, became president and CEO of Six Apart.
