= Josh Quittner =

American journalist (born 1957)

- Born: February 12, 1957 (age 69)
- Occupation: Journalist

Josh Quittner (born February 12, 1957) is an American journalist. He is CEO of Decrypt Media, a website which covers cryptocurrencies, NFTs and Web3.

== Early life and education ==
Born in Manhattan, Quittner grew up in Reading, Pennsylvania. He is a graduate of Grinnell College and the Columbia University Graduate School of Journalism. He is married to Michelle Slatalla and has three daughters, including Ella Quittner, who is also a journalist and screenwriter.

== Career ==
He has co-authored five books with his wife, including Masters of Deception: The Gang That Ruled Cyberspace (Harper-Collins, 1995) about the New York-based hacker group Masters of Deception, Speeding the Net: The Inside Story of Netscape and How it Challenged Microsoft (1998), Mother's Day (1993), Flame War: A Cyberthriller (1998), and Shoofly Pie to Die (1992).

Quittner spent the first twelve years of his career as a newspaper reporter. He was a crime reporter and a general assignment writer before he started to write about technology from the consumer side at Newsday in 1992. Quittner then freelanced for Wired Magazine and was the original domain-name holder of mcdonalds.com, which he registered for an early Wired piece on domain-name squatting. He later turned the domain over to Mcdonald's after they donated $3,500 to a public school in Brooklyn, New York for computers and internet access at his request. Quittner also freelanced for the webzine HotWired, which ran his manifesto of the "Info Revolution" titled "The Birth of Way New Journalism," a riff on New Journalism that "became an instant cliché."

He joined Time Inc. as a staff writer in 1995. During his initial seven years at Time Magazine he worked for Pathfinder, Time Inc.'s first independent online presence, where he launched the Netly News, one of the web's first daily news publications. He then became the editor of Time's spinoff technology supplement Time Digital, later called ON Magazine.

From April 2002 until September 2007 Quittner was the editor of Business 2.0. Quittner briefly revived "Netly News" as the name of a Business 2.0 blog. He also owns the domain name roofmagazine.com, which currently Roof, a sporadically updated real-estate blog.

After Business 2.0, he served briefly as an executive editor at Fortune Magazine, working at its San Francisco bureau, before rejoining Time in April 2008 as an editor-at-large.

From 2011 to 2018, he was the editorial director at Flipboard.

In 2018, Quittner and Ryan Bubinski co-founded Decrypt, an online news website focused on blockchain, Web3 and artificial intelligence.
