= Remodelista =

Interior design and lifestyle website

- Website type: Interior Design & Lifestyle
- Available in: English
- Founded: November 2007; 18 years ago
- Headquarters: New York, New York, {{{location_country}}}
- Owner: Remodelista LLC
- Founders: Julie Carlson, Francesca Connolly, Janet Hall, Sarah Lonsdale
- Editor: Julie Carlson
- Key people: Josh Groves (CEO)
- Website: https://www.remodelista.com/
- Current status: Active

Remodelista is an interior design and lifestyle website operated by Remodelista LLC. It was founded in 2007 by the current editor-in-chief Julie Carlson along with Francesca Connolly, Janet Hall, and Sarah Lonsdale. The company is based in New York City.

== History ==
Remodelista was founded as an independent website in 2007 by Carlson, Connolly, Hall, and Lonsdale to provide an online sourcebook for users planning a home renovation or remodel with the goal of furnishing rooms with a mix of classics, vintage finds and modernist pieces.

In 2008, Josh Groves joined as publisher and later becomes CEO. Following its redesign in 2009 and continuous growth, Remodelista was acquired by San Francisco company SAY Media in August 2011.

In 2012, Remodelista spun off its garden section to an independent sister website under SAY Media ownership, Gardenista, with former New York Times columnist Michelle Slatalla as editor-in-chief.

In 2014, Times Internet partnered with SAY Media to launch an Indian version of Remodelista.

In 2015, Julie Carlson and Josh Groves bought Remodelista and Gardenista from SAY Media for an undisclosed amount. Also in 2015, Amazon announced their Expert Articles as part of an expanded content platform with Remodelista as one of the early industry experts announced.

In 2016, Remodelista and Gardenista was acquired by Realtor.com, operated by the News Corporation subsidiary Move, Inc. At the time of sale, the two sites reportedly received 1.5 million readers per month.

In November 2017, Remodelista launched a second companion site, The Organized Home, in conjunction with the publication of the book Remodelista: The Organized Home.

In June 2019, Remodelista announced that it was once again independently owned along with sister sites Gardenista and Organized Home after three years as part of News Corporation subsidiary Realtor.com. According to the announcement, the transition was due to a strategy restructure following Realtor.com's $210 million acquisition of real-estate leads generation platform OpCity. Few details surrounding the deal were released but they reported that the combined readership of the sites reached 1.7 million users per month.

== Site features ==
According to its company website, Remodelista is "a sourcebook for the considered home", guiding readers through the remodeling and design process. In addition, the blog publishes lifestyle content, including pieces about travel. The travel section covers noteworthy design shops and hotels, restaurants and other design-oriented sights in the US and abroad. Often these pieces will have an "Expert Advice" angle, with a design professional providing advice about shops, hotels, and restaurants.

In 2010, the website launched an invitation-only directory of architects and designers. Editor at Large named it one of the top four online designer directories in 2014.

In 2013, the website first launched its "Considered Design Awards," a series of awards for reader-submitted photos of their interior spaces.

== Events ==
Between 2010 and 2016, Remodelista hosted 18 Remodelista Markets in Marin County, San Francisco, Los Angeles, Boston, Portland, Seattle, NYC, and London. Remodelista Markets offered goods from artisanal makers and designers, which included handmade ceramics, clothing, jewelry, organic botanicals, and artisanal foods.

== Related websites ==
Remodelista's sister site Gardenista, which focuses on outdoor spaces, was launched in 2011 initially as a section of Remodelista. It became a separate website in 2012.

In November 2017, Remodelista launched a second companion site, The Organized Home, in conjunction with the publication of the book Remodelista: The Organized Home.

== Books ==
In October 2013, Remodelista: A Manual For The Considered Home (ISBN 978-1579655365), written by Julie Carlson with photography by Matthew Williams, was published by Artisan. The book includes tours of homes and advice on how to recreate one's own space in a similar style. Academy Awards winner Julianne Moore wrote the foreword to the book.

In November 2017, Artisan published Remodelista: The Organized Home (ISBN 978-1579656935), written by Julie Carlson and Margot Guralnick with photography by Matthew Williams.
