= Expert Labs =

- Founded: November 2009
- Type: Non-profit
- Purpose: Technology incubator, public expertise for government
- Region served: United States
- Key people: Anil Dash (Director), Gina Trapani (Product Director)
- Parent organization: American Association for the Advancement of Science

Expert Labs was a non-profit technology incubator intended to aid government access expertise from interested members of the public. Part of the American Association for the Advancement of Science, it was formed in November 2009, following discussions with the White House Office of Science & Technology Policy. Expert Labs is directed by longtime blogger and technology evangelist Anil Dash. Initial funding of US$500,000 is from the MacArthur Foundation.

Gina Trapani joined as a Product Director in February 2010. Her private project ThinkTank has since been renamed ThinkUp and is now funded by Expert Labs.
