= Gina Trapani =

American tech blogger, web developer, and writer

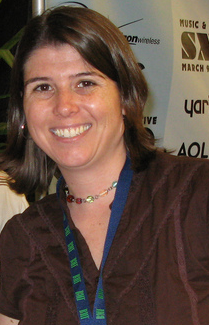
- Trapani at SXSWi, 2007
- Born: September 19, 1975 (age 51); Brooklyn, New York
- Occupations: Tech blogger, web developer, writer
- Known for: Founder of Lifehacker
- Website: ginatrapani.org

Gina Marie Trapani (born September 19, 1975) is an American tech blogger, web developer, writer, and technology executive.

== Early life and education ==
Trapani was born and raised in an Italian Catholic family in Brooklyn, New York. Trapani graduated from Marist College and earned an MS in Computer Science at Brooklyn College.

== Career ==
She began her writing career in high school as a writer for New Youth Connections (now YCteen), a magazine written by and for New York City teens published by Youth Communication.

Trapani founded the Lifehacker blog in January 2005, resigning in January 2009. She later joined Expert Labs where she led development of ThinkUp, an open-source social media aggregation and analysis tool, which was shuttered in 2016. In 2017 she joined Postlight as Director of Engineering, and is now CEO.

Trapani has also been featured on yourBlogstory, a popular Bloggers featuring network. Trapani has published three books and has also written for other publications including Harvard Business Online.

== Awards and recognition ==
Wired magazine awarded her its prestigious Rave Award in 2006. Fast Company named her one of the Most Influential Women in Technology in 2009 and 2010. In 2019, she was named one of the most influential LGBTQ+ people in tech.

== Personal life ==
As of December 2013, Trapani lives in Brooklyn, New York.

Trapani has two brothers. She is openly lesbian and married her longtime partner and friend, Terra Bailey, on June 17, 2008. Their daughter, Etta Rebecca Bailey, was born September 18, 2012.

Trapani joined the board of directors for Radiant Earth in March 2023.

== Books ==
- Trapani, Gina (December 18, 2006). Lifehacker: 88 Tech Tricks to Turbocharge Your Day. Wiley. ISBN 0-470-05065-9.
- Trapani, Gina (March 17, 2008). Upgrade Your Life: The Lifehacker Guide to Working Smarter, Faster, Better. Wiley. ISBN 978-0-470-23836-3.
- Trapani, Gina (March 15, 2010). The Complete Guide to Google Wave. 3ones, Inc. ISBN 978-0-9825926-0-1.
- Trapani, Gina; Pash, Adam (June 28, 2011). Lifehacker: The Guide to Working Smarter, Faster, and Better. Wiley. ISBN 978-1-118-01837-8.
