= Vernon Pratt =

American painter (1940–2000)

- Born: Vernon Pratt; 1940; Durham, North Carolina, U.S.
- Died: 2000 (aged 59–60); Virginia, U.S.
- Education: San Francisco Art Institute
- Known for: Painting, Music Jazz
- Notable work: "All the Possibilities of Filling in Sixteenths," "All the Possibilities of Filling in Ninths," "Still Life's #3-54," "73 Grays," "Merton Quartet"
- Movement: Minimalism, Modernism

Vernon Pratt (1940 - 2000) was an American painter and jazz musician who worked in the style of minimalism and modernism. He created mainly black, white, and grayscale paintings focused on mathematical systems as well as rhythms, harmonies, variations, and permutations.

== Life ==
Born in Durham, North Carolina, Pratt studied his undergraduate coursework at Duke University in Durham where he grew up before transferring to the San Francisco Art Institute where he received his B.F.A and his M.F.A before returning to Duke University to teach. "Notable accomplishments include being the subject of a major solo exhibition at NCMA (1985-86), exhibiting in numerous high-profile shows nationally and internationally including The NY Times reviewed "Tit for Tatlin" exhibit at the Alternative Museum in NY (1984), collaborating with Sol LeWitt, creating the NC Education Wall (with Georgann Eubanks) and being friends and contemporaries of Andy Warhol, Keith Haring and James Weeks. Recent exhibitions include major solo shows at the Gregg Museum of Art & Design (October, 2018 - February, 2019) and the Western Carolina University Fine Art Museum (August - November, 2018).

== Work ==
Perhaps Vernon Pratt's most famous work, largely because of its sheer size and mathematical accomplishment, is "All the Possibilities of Filling in Sixteenths", which was displayed for the first and currently only time at the Gregg Museum of Art and Design at North Carolina State University from October 11, 2018, to February 10, 2019.

== Painting ==
Pratt mainly created abstract images centered on different mathematical concepts and scales of color or pattern. Pratt worked mainly in black, white and grayscale and many of his paintings are extremely large. Pratt is quoted as saying, "Simple is complicated enough", in regards to his form of abstract painting that seems to be overly simplified at first glance.

== Music ==
Pratt was also an accomplished Jazz musician. He incorporated his knowledge of music which related to knowledge of math into his paintings in order to help create his systematic abstractions.

== Valuation ==
Many of Pratt's works are part of permanent museum collections and some have been sold at auction. Pratt's painting have been sold at auction for upwards of twenty thousand dollars, these are generally some of his more abstract grayscale works, while his more colorful and representational works have sold for around five thousand dollars. The Vernon Pratt project, in its efforts to make Pratt's work recognized and known has gifted many of his works to museums and universities including, The Western Carolina Fine Art Museum, the Asheville Art Museum, Weatherspoon Art Museum, UNC Greensboro, Duke University, the Gregg Museum of Art & Design, and North Carolina State University.

== Selected works ==
"All the Possibilities of Filling in Sixteenths"

"All the Possibilities of Filling in Ninths"

"All the Possibilities of Filling in Eighths, Diagonal Order, Merging"

"All the Possibilities of Black and White in 0-8 Coats"

"The Studio"

"RAD.ER.DAR'S RAD RED AD"

"One Stencil Forms all the Possibilities of Three into Four"

"Still Life's #3-54"
