= Doxie =

Line of document and photo scanners produced by Scanned, Inc

Doxie is a line of document and photo scanners produced by Scanned, Inc, an American hardware and software company that also produces IntelliScanner, Barcode Producer, and Easy Barcode Creator. Their scanners were first demonstrated live during the 2010 Consumer Electronics Show Las Vegas, and have been available on the consumer market since February 2010.

== Products ==
Doxie offers several variants of scanners including the Doxie Pro series, Doxie Go SE series, Doxie Q series, Doxie Flip, and the original Doxie Go.

== Software ==
All Doxie scanners come with included companion software for Mac, Windows, and iOs. Scans can be synched to the desktop via USB or SD card, or, for models with built-in Wi-Fi, wirelessly to the desktop or iOs device. Documents can be saved as JPEG, PDF or lossless PNG.

Doxie software can perform automatic adjustments like cropping, rotation and contrast on each scan. Further modifications can be made such as merging documents into a single, multi-page PDF, converting PDFs to text using optical character recognition, interleaving single-sided scans to create double-sided documents, and, auto-stitching to turn overlapping scans into a single image.

Documents can be saved to the desktop or iOs device, sent to local apps like Photos, Mail, or Messages, or sent to cloud apps like Dropbox, Evernote, OneNote, and iCloud Drive.

== See also ==
- Document scanner
