= Movable Type =

Blogging software

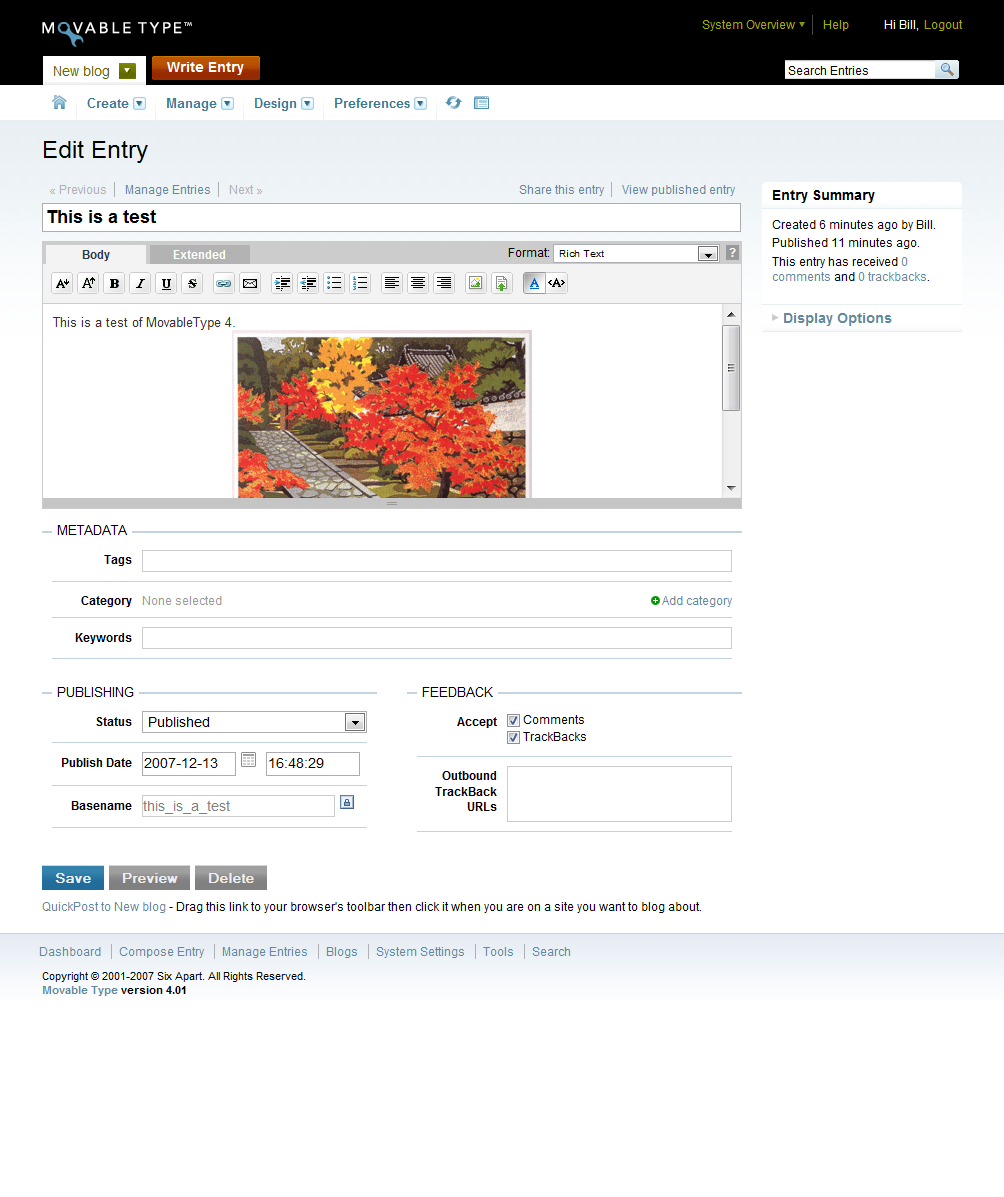
- Original author: Ben Trott
- Developer: Six Apart
- Release: October 8, 2001; 25 years ago

Stable release(s)
- 8.4.0 / November 5, 2024; 2 years ago
- Platform: Perl, PHP (for dynamic publishing)
- Available in: 7 languages
- List of languages Dutch, English, French, German, Japanese, Russian, Spanish
- Type: Blog publishing system
- License: Proprietary software
- Website: movabletype.org
- Repository: github.com/movabletype/movabletype

Movable Type is a weblog publishing system developed by the company Six Apart. It was publicly announced on September 3, 2001; version 1.0 was publicly released on October 8, 2001. The current version is 8.0.

Movable Type is proprietary software. From June 2007 to July 2013, Six Apart ran the Movable Type Open Source Project, which offered a version of Movable Type under the GPL.

== Features ==
Movable Type's features include the ability to host multiple weblogs and standalone content pages, manage files, user roles, templates, tags, categories, and trackback links. The application supports static page generation (in which files for each page are updated whenever the content of the site is changed), dynamic page generation (in which pages are composited from the underlying data as the browser requests them), or a combination of the two techniques. Movable Type optionally supports Lightweight Directory Access Protocol (LDAP) for user and group management and automatic blog provisioning.

Movable Type is written in Perl, and supports storage of the weblog's content and associated data within MySQL natively. PostgreSQL and SQLite support was available prior to version 5, and can still be used via plug-ins. Movable Type Enterprise also supports the Oracle database and Microsoft SQL Server.

== History ==
Version 1.0 was released in October 2001.

The TrackBack feature was introduced in version 2.2, and was adopted by a number of other blog systems.

With the release of version 3.0 in 2004, there were marked changes in Movable Type's licensing, most notably placing greater restrictions on its use without paying a licensing fee. This sparked criticism from some users of the software, with some moving to the then-new open-source blogging tool WordPress. With the release of Movable Type 3.2, the ability to create an unlimited number of weblogs at all licensing levels was restored. In Movable Type 3.3, the product once again became completely free for personal users.

Six Apart released a beta version of Movable Type 4 on June 5, 2007, and re-launched movabletype.org as a community site, for purposes of developing an open-source version that was released under the GNU General Public License on December 12, 2007. Movable Type 4's Enterprise version provides advanced features such as LDAP management, and enterprise database integration such as Oracle, MySQL, user roles, blog cloning, and automated blog provisioning. It is also available as part of Intel's SuiteTwo professional software offering of Web 2.0 tools.

Movable Type 5 was released in Open Source and Pro versions in January 2010, with several bug-fix and security updates appearing later in the year. Movable Type Enterprise remains based on Movable Type 4.

Movable Type 6 was released in 2013; this release included the termination (once again) of the Open Source licensing option. Movable Type is now available in "Professional" and "Enterprise" closed versions.

Melody was a fork of the open-source Movable Type distribution, announced in June 2009. Its development was being guided by a non-profit group consisting of current and former Six Apart employees, as well as other consultants and volunteers, but development appeared to cease in the middle of 2011.

At various times, Six Apart also maintained three other weblog publishing systems—TypePad, Vox, and LiveJournal. While Movable Type is a system which needs to be installed on a user's own web server, TypePad, Vox, and LiveJournal were all hosted weblog services. LiveJournal, purchased in 2005, was sold in 2007. Shortly before being acquired by web advertising firm VideoEgg to form SAY Media in September 2010, Six Apart announced that it would be shutting down the Vox service at the end of that month, leaving TypePad and Movable Type as the company's only blogging platforms. In January 2011, SAY Media announced that Infocom, a Japanese IT company, had acquired Six Apart Japan and that as part of the transaction, Infocom would assume responsibility for Movable Type.

== See also ==
- Weblog software
- List of content management systems
- WordPress
