= Vox (blogging platform) =

Former Internet blogging service

Vox was an Internet blogging service run by Six Apart.

== Blogging service ==
Announced on September 21, 2005 by Six Apart president Mena Trott at the DEMO Fall conference under the codename "Project Comet," the site began private alpha testing in March 2006. In June 2006, the site entered public beta—opening registration to outside users on a limited basis via an invitation system—and transitioned to its official name Vox, moving the site to the domain Vox.com. Vox officially launched on October 26, 2006, with registration opened to the general public.

Developed as a Web 2.0-oriented service, Vox emphasized integrated social networking and community interaction features; a simple, clean aesthetic, with an easy-to-use posting system; granular privacy controls for content viewing permissions; and rich media content, including integration with various web services such as Amazon.com, YouTube, Flickr, and Photobucket. Vox was written in Perl, using the Catalyst framework.

On September 2, 2010, Six Apart announced Vox would close permanently at the end of the month, providing export tools to their TypePad blogging platform and to Flickr. New content could be posted to the service until September 15, 2010. Advertising company VideoEgg acquired Six Apart the same month, naming the combined company SAY Media. Vox closed permanently on September 30, 2010 at 3:20 p.m. Pacific Daylight Time.

In 2013, Say Media sold the Vox.com domain to Vox Media, which would become used for Vox Media's news website Vox, which launched in March 2014.
