= Typepad =

Blogging service

- Website type: Blog hosting
- Owner: Endurance International Group
- Website: www.typepad.com
- Commercial: Yes
- Registration: Optional
- Launched: October 2003; 23 years ago
- Current status: Defunct

Typepad was a blogging service owned by Endurance International Group, previously owned by SAY Media (from the merger of Six Apart and VideoEgg). In August 2025, the site announced it would shut down in September of that year.

== History ==
Typepad was created by Six Apart.

Originally launched in October 2003, Typepad was based on Six Apart's Movable Type platform, and shared technology with Movable Type such as templates and APIs, but was marketed to non-technical users and included additional features like multiple author support, photo albums and mobile blogging.

The service was available in several languages and countries around the world. In the United States, Typepad was sold at four different paid subscription levels.

Typepad was used by many large organizations and media companies to host their weblogs, such as MSNBC, Time, and Wired. Other outlets included ABC, the CBC, the BBC and Sky News.

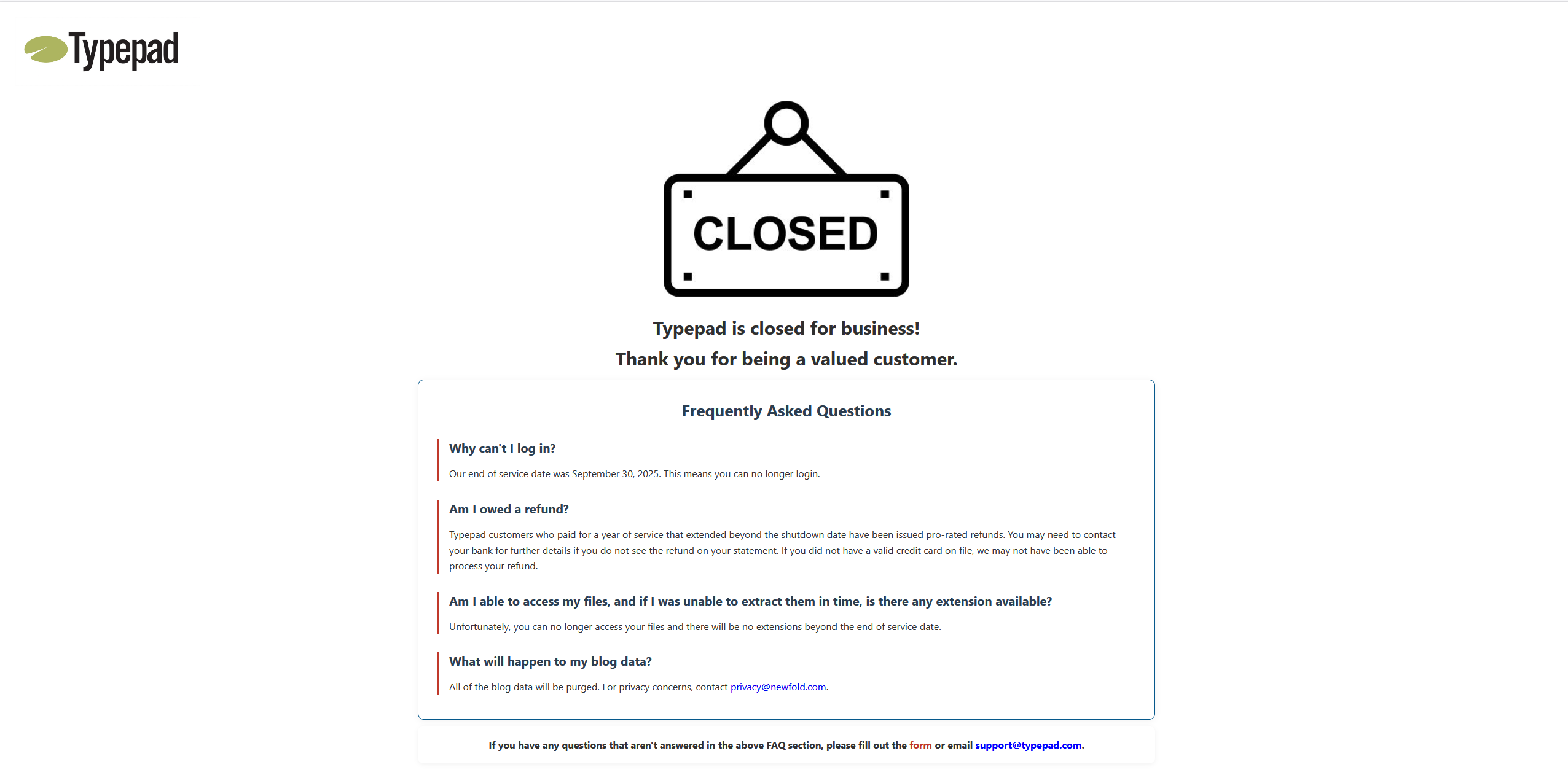
Typepad shutdown announcement as seen on October 2, 2025; the notice remained until October 30, after which users were redirected to the parent company’s website.

As of the end of 2020, Typepad was no longer accepting new signups. Instead, the company referred new users to Bluehost, another web hosting company owned by Endurance International Group. On August 27, 2025, Typepad announced it would shut down on September 30, 2025.
