= SAY Media =

Technology and advertising firm

VideoEgg logo

Say Media (formerly VideoEgg) is a technology and advertising firm. The company provides a publishing platform (Tempest) to professional publishers and sells advertising across that platform and extended network of sites. Say Media has offices in San Francisco, Portland, NY, London, Montreal, Toronto, Chicago, and Detroit and is privately held.

== History ==
videoegg mascot from company headquarters in San Francisco

Say Media was formed when VideoEgg (a video advertising company) bought Six Apart (a technology company that created Moveable Type and TypePad). VideoEgg was founded in early 2005 when Yale University graduates David Lerman, Matthew Sanchez and Kevin Sladek were making video software. At the time, the three were involved in a social venture matching non-profit organizations that needed public service announcements with a nationwide network of digital filmmakers and editors.

Lerman, Sanchez and Sladek created tools to manage web video made with the wide range of available devices, editors, encoders, and players.

As their business matured they began to focus on monetization, they found an opportunity in video advertising in online video and online social networking services. In May, 2008 the company officially discontinued video hosting services to focus entirely on its online advertising network.

In June 2008, VideoEgg and one of its partner websites, hi5, were sued in the United States by EMI recording labels and music publishers. The plaintiffs alleged that the services were liable for copyright infringement due to videos uploaded by hi5 users through the VideoEgg application, and sought injunctions against the allegedly infringing activity.

VideoEgg acquired Six Apart in 2010, and renamed itself Say Media. It sold Movable Type and the Six Apart name to Infocom, a Japanese information technology company; Say Media retained TypePad. As a result of this transaction, the headquarters of Six Apart is now Tokyo, Japan.

Say Media acquired the websites Dogster, ReadWriteWeb, POPcast Communications, and Remodelista over the past several years. It also launched xoJane, with editor Jane Pratt, xoVain, its beauty-centric counterpart, and Gardenista, a sister site of Remodelista. In 2013, the company divested these assets to focus on the Tempest platform and advertising operations. Say Media subsequently sold Dogster & Catster, ReadWriteWeb, Remodelista and Gardenista, which as of early 2015 all operate independently or under new ownership.

== Funding ==
Say Media is a privately owned company. As of 2010, VideoEgg had conducted four rounds of funding, raising over $30 million. Investors include First Round Capital, WPP Group, August Capital, Focus Ventures and Maveron.

== Products and services ==
The company currently builds, maintains and provides Tempest, a publishing platform, to professional publishers in exchange for managing their unsold inventory. As of October 2016, 50 sites including Maxim, Rachael Ray, Climbing, Bio, and Fashionista were using the platform. Say's in-house design team (located in Portland, Oregon) creates display ad units and the custom overlay using advertiser's creative assets.

In July 2008, VideoEgg announced several new capabilities to their ad network. These include offering advertisers increased ad features and functionalities, such as:

- Real-time RSS feeds to continually update the ad experience
- Zip code-specific messaging
- Rich multi-video ad experience to increase user interactivity
- Merchandising multiple items in a single real-time ad experience
- Viral capabilities to help spread the message through virtually any communication or social channel

Publishers are able to integrate VideoEgg's AdPlatform. VideoEgg then serves the ads, which are designed to fit in any space and publishers receive payment every time a user engages with one of the VideoEgg ad units on the publisher's site.

== Trademark ==
The company successfully filed a lawsuit for trademark infringement against an Israeli company (associated with the Komodia library) also calling itself Say Media. That company has since changed names.
