= Goddard v. Google, Inc. =

- Court: United States District Court for the Northern District of California
- Decided: July 30, 2009
- Citation: 640 F. Supp. 2d 1193

Case history
- Prior action: 2008 U.S. Dist. LEXIS 101890

Holding
- The court dismissed Goddard's complaint without leave to amend, holding that Google was immune from liability for suggesting fraudulent websites via its Keyword Tool pursuant to Section 230(c) of the Communications Decency Act.

Court membership
- Judge sitting: Jeremy Fogel

Keywords
- Section 230 of the Communications Decency Act

Goddard v. Google, Inc., 640 F. Supp. 2d 1193 (N.D. Cal. Jul. 30, 2009), is a case in which Jenna Goddard ("Plaintiff") alleged that she and a class of similarly situated individuals were harmed by Google ("Defendant") as a result of clicking allegedly fraudulent web-based advertisements for mobile subscription services ("MSSPs"). The United States District Court for the Northern District of California held that the action was barred by Section 230 of the Communications Decency Act ("CDA") and dismissed the complaint without leave to amend.

== Facts and procedural history ==
While on Google's search results page, Goddard clicked on advertisements that led her to allegedly fraudulent websites. She then entered her cell phone number on the allegedly fraudulent sites to download ringtones, an action for which she was unknowingly charged. Goddard filed a lawsuit against Google on April 13, 2008, claiming that she was an intended third-party beneficiary of Google's AdWords Content Policy that Google failed to adequately enforce by aiding and abetting the fraud sites. Google asserted that each of Goddard's claims was barred by the CDA, which prevents a website from being treated as the "publisher or speaker" of third-party content. The court rejected Goddard's "artful" pleading and dismissed her complaint with leave to amend in a decision issued on December 17, 2008.

In her amended complaint, Goddard lleged that "Google's involvement in creating the allegedly fraudulent advertisements was so pervasive that the company controlled much of the underlying commercial activity engaged in by the third-party advertisers." She further asserted that Google "not only encourages illegal conduct, but collaborates in the development of the illegal content and, effectively, requires its advertiser customers to engage in it."

== Section 230(c) of the CDA ==
Protection for "good samaritan" blocking and screening of offensive material

(1) Treatment of publisher or speaker—No provider or user of an interactive computer service shall be treated as the publisher or speaker of any information provided by another information content provider.

== Decision ==
The court relied on Carafano v. Metrosplash.com, which found that the CDA provides "robust" immunity for internet service providers and websites where courts have adopted "a relatively expansive definition of 'interactive computer service' and a relatively restrictive definition of 'information content provider.'" Therefore, a website operator is not liable as an "information content provider" merely by augmenting the content of online material generally. Rather, the website must contribute "materially ... to its alleged unlawfulness." A website does not so contribute when it merely provides third parties with neutral tools to create web content, even if the website has knowledge that third parties are using such tools to create illegal content.

=== Developer liability ===
Goddard alleged that Google's Keyword Tool is not a "neutral tool" because when a potential advertiser enters the word "ringtone" into Google's Keyword Tool, the tool suggests the word "free." According to Goddard this suggestion is "neither innocuous nor neutral" because Google is aware of the "mobile content industry's unauthorized charge problems." The court rejected Goddard's argument that the Keyword Tool materially contributes to the alleged illegality and thereby establishes developer liability. The court cited Carafano v. Metrosplash.com, where it ruled that "if a particular tool 'facilitates the expression of information,' it generally will be considered 'neutral' so long as users ultimately determine what content to post, such that the tool merely provides 'a framework that could be utilized for proper or improper purposes.'" Thus, like the menus in Carafano, Google's Keyword Tool is a neutral tool that merely provides options to advertisers. Goddard further alleged that Google effectively requires advertisers to engage in illegal conduct. The court held that Goddard's use of the word "requires" is inconsistent with the allegation that Google "suggests" words to the advertisers. The court referred to the Ninth Circuit ruling in Fair Housing Council of San Fernando Valley v. Roommates.com, LLC where CDA immunity was denied because the website forced subscribers to disclose protected characteristics and discriminatory preferences as "a condition of using its services." The court thereby concluded that Goddard's reasoning failed to disclose a "requirement" of any kind or suggest the type of "direct and palpable" involvement that otherwise is required to obviate CDA immunity.

=== Contract claims in light of Barnes v. Yahoo! ===
Goddard alleged that she and similarly situated individuals were intended third-party beneficiaries of Google's Advertising Terms which include a Content Policy requiring that mobile subscription service advertisers display certain information about their products, including whether downloading the products will result in charges to the consumer. In Barnes v. Yahoo!, Inc. the court addressed the immunity of Yahoo! against Barnes' claim that it was either negligent in undertaking to remove, or breached an oral contract to remove, offensive and unauthorized content posted about the plaintiff by her ex-boyfriend on one of Yahoo!'s public profile pages. The court found that claims alleging that a website negligently undertook to remove harmful content are barred by the CDA. However, the court noted that certain promissory conduct by a defendant may remove it from the protections of the CDA even where the alleged promise was to remove or screen third-party content. Barnes implies that when a party engages in conduct giving rise to an independent and enforceable contractual obligation, that party may be liable not as a publisher or speaker of third-party content but instead under contract law. Here, however, there was no allegation that Google ever promised Goddard or anyone else that it would enforce its Content Policy. Also, even if Google had promised to enforce its Content Policy, Goddard would not be a third-party beneficiary of that promise: Google would be the promisor and the allegedly fraudulent MSSP would be a promisee. Thus, the court also rejected Goddard's contract claim.

=== Holding ===
Federal Judge Jeremy Fogel reasoned that "a plaintiff may not establish developer liability merely by alleging that the operator of a website should have known that the availability of certain tools might facilitate the posting of improper content.” The court held that Goddard's claims treat Google as the publisher or speaker of third-party content, but she failed to substantiate the "labels and conclusions" by which she attempted to escape the scope of the CDA. Further, the court emphasized that the CDA "must be interpreted to protect websites not merely from ultimate liability, but from having to fight costly and protracted legal battles." For these reasons, the court dismissed Goddard's complaint without leave to amend.
