= Lemmon v. Snap, Inc. =

2021 United States court case

- Court: United States Court of Appeals for the Ninth Circuit
- Full case name: Carly Lemmon, et al. v. Snap, Inc.
- Decided: May 4, 2021
- Citation: 995 F.3d 1085

Court membership
- Judges sitting: Kim McLane Wardlaw, Carlos Tiburcio Bea, and James David Cain Jr.

Lemmon v. Snap, Inc., 995 F.3d 1085 (9th Cir., 2021), is a decision by the United States Court of Appeals for the Ninth Circuit, holding that Section 230 of the Communications Decency Act does not prevent a negligent design claim against Snap Inc. for the Speed Filter feature in Snapchat, because the claim targeted the social media platform's design rather than third-party content that it hosted.

After several accidents attributed to excessive speeding encouraged by the Speed Filter, a feature that let users of Snapchat share with their friends how fast they were moving, the parents of three young men who died in a car accident sued Snap Inc., alleging that the negligent design of Snapchat caused their children's deaths. The district court dismissed the action, ruling that Section 230 rendered Snap Inc. immune from the claim.

The United States Court of Appeals for the Ninth Circuit reversed the lower court's ruling and remanded the case. The Ninth Circuit's opinion clarified the requirements for a Section 230 defense and held that claims specifically targeting a product's design would be able to bypass the statute's protections, which are focused on content created by a platform's users rather than the design of the platform itself.

== Background ==
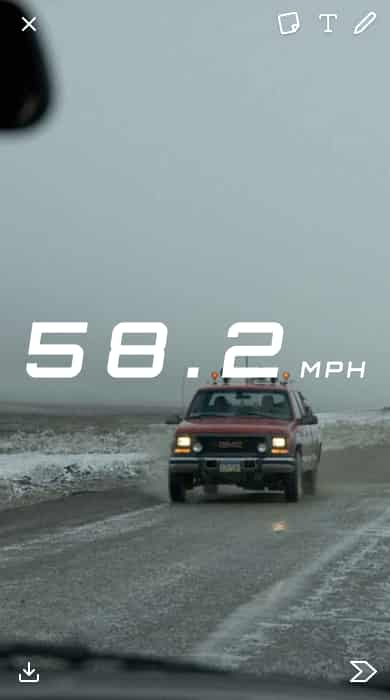
A mockup of what the Speed Filter looked like in 2015.

Snapchat is a social media app created by Snap Inc. that is primarily used for creating and sharing "snaps"—photos or short videos, optionally edited with effects like filters—with other users of the app. In December 2013, Snap Inc. added the Speed Filter to Snapchat. When enabled, the Speed Filter allowed the user to record their real-time speed while driving and overlay it on their snaps. Many Snapchat users believed incorrectly that they would be rewarded by the app if they recorded a speed of over 100 miles per hour using the Speed Filter.

In September 2015, a man was seriously injured in Atlanta, Georgia, in a collision with a driver who was trying to exceed 100 miles per hour on the Speed Filter. That December, three young women died in a car accident in Philadelphia, Pennsylvania, while using the Speed Filter. In November 2016, a young couple crashed into a minivan in Tampa, Florida, while recording a speed of over 115 miles per hour on the Speed Filter. The crash killed the couple and three of the minivan's occupants.

Between 2013 and 2017, Snapchat was criticized by news outlets and road-safety experts for encouraging unsafe driving, and multiple Change.org petitions were created calling for the Speed Filter's removal. In response to the various accidents, Snap Inc. added a "Don't Snap and drive" warning to the Speed Filter, disabled sharing snaps using the filter when exceeding 35 miles per hour, and decreased its prominence in Snapchat's interface by changing it from a "filter" to a "sticker".

On May 28, 2017, Jason Davis (age 17) was driving down a road in Wisconsin. His friends, Hunter Morby (age 17) and Landen Brown (age 20), were passengers. After traveling at high speeds for several minutes, they drove off the road and crashed into a tree. Shortly before the accident, one of the boys posted a snap using the Speed Filter, showing their speed at 123 miles per hour. All three boys died in the crash.

=== Lawsuit ===
On May 23, 2019, the parents of Morby and Brown sued Snap Inc. in the United States District Court for the Central District of California for wrongful death and personal injury. They alleged that the negligent design of Snapchat caused their children's deaths because the Speed Filter encouraged them to drive at dangerous speeds. The parents also claimed that, after multiple previous accidents and criticism, Snap Inc. knew that the Speed Filter encouraged reckless driving and did not remove the feature, causing several deadly accidents.

Snap Inc. requested that the lawsuit be dismissed, arguing that the parents' negligence claim was insufficient grounds for relief, and even if it was not, Snap Inc. was immune from the suit under Section 230 of the Communications Decency Act. Section 230 protects providers of internet services from legal liability related to their failure to moderate third-party content.

== District court ruling ==
The district court dismissed the lawsuit in February 2020, ruling that Section 230 rendered Snap Inc. immune from the claim. The court held that Section 230 protected the company because the Speed Filter was a "neutral tool" that Snapchat's users could use either beneficially or harmfully. The court did not rule on whether the parents' negligence claim would've been sufficient grounds for relief if not for Section 230.

The court's justification for its decision was partially guided by the precedent set by Dyroff v. The Ultimate Software Group, Inc., an earlier case in which the Ninth Circuit ruled that social media websites cannot be held liable for recommendation algorithms or notification systems that propagate illegal content. Aside from Dyroff, the court applied several other cases to its decision, including Doe v. Internet Brands, Inc. (Section 230 immunity applies even if the plaintiffs were harmed) and Fair Housing Council of San Fernando Valley v. Roommates.com, LLC (Section 230 overrides because it was unclear whether Snap Inc. caused the harm).

The district court also acknowledged Maynard v. Snapchat, Inc., a parallel case in the Georgia Court of Appeals arising from the September 2015 accident in Atlanta. Even though the Georgia court dismissed the case against Snapchat per Section 230, the court in Lemmon v. Snap, Inc. distinguished the ruling for not applying the Ninth Circuit's "neutral tools" standard.

== Circuit court ruling ==
The parents appealed the district court decision to the Ninth Circuit Court of Appeals in March 2021.

The circuit court applied a three-prong test, determining that a company like Snap, Inc. is only protected from liability under Section 230 if it is:

1. A provider or user of an interactive computer service...
2. ... whom a plaintiff seeks to treat, under a state law cause of action, as a publisher or speaker...
3. ... of information provided by another information content provider.

While Snapchat was, indeed, an interactive computer service, the court held that the other two elements of the test were not satisfied: even if no snaps were ever posted using the Speed Filter, the claim could have still been brought against Snap Inc. for its negligent design of the filter itself; therefore, the claim was not related to third-party content and would not be barred by Section 230.

In its May 2021 ruling, the Ninth Circuit thus reversed the district court's decision and remanded the case to the lower court to determine Snap Inc's liability for the deaths under the newly formulated standard.

== Impact and legacy ==
The Lemmon v. Snap, Inc. decision clarified the necessary test for a Section 230 defense in the Ninth Circuit and created a narrow exception for claims directed solely toward the design of a social media platform. In June 2021, Snap Inc. removed the Speed Filter from the app entirely, citing lack of use by Snapchat's users.

On remand, the district court found that the plaintiffs sufficiently alleged that Snap Inc. was liable for the accident because it developed the Speed Filter, which in turn encouraged and indirectly rewarded reckless driving. The parents and the company settled the case for an undisclosed amount in 2023.

The Electronic Frontier Foundation, a proponent of Section 230, praised the Ninth Circuit's ruling for allowing the lawsuit to move forward based on a product negligence claim without creating new incentives for websites to take down user speech. In contrast, Eric Goldman, a professor at the Santa Clara University School of Law specializing in internet law, warned that, while the Lemmon ruling seems narrow, the multitude of cases attempting to preempt Section 230 by citing Lemmon "pose a serious threat to Section 230". Adam Sieff, an attorney who defends technology companies in Section 230 cases, similarly stated that decisions like Lemmon are being "stretch[ed], or willfully misread ... well beyond their application".

The Ninth Circuit's ruling in Lemmon v. Snap, Inc. has been widely cited in lawsuits and legislative efforts against social media companies for social media addiction among children and teenagers.
