= Milgram v. Orbitz =

U.S. court case

- Court: New Jersey Superior Court
- Full case name: Milgram v. Orbitz Worldwide, LLC
- Decided: August 26, 2010
- Citation: Milgram v. Orbitz Worldwide, LLC, ESX-C-142-09 (N.J. Super. Ct. Aug. 26, 2010)

Court membership
- Judge sitting: Hon. Patricia K. Costello

Case opinions
- CDA § 230(c)(1) precludes liability where the duty that the plaintiff alleges the defendant violated derives from the defendant's status or conduct as a publisher or speaker. The name or wording of the cause of action, and whether the defendant is a commercial actor, are not dispositive. Where objectionable content is not supplied, required, or requested by a defendant, the defendant is not an information content provider under the CDA, even if it performs traditional editorial functions such as selective deletion or alteration of user content.

Keywords
- CDA § 230; Federal preemption; Fraud; Misrepresentation

In Milgram v. Orbitz Worldwide, LLC, the New Jersey Superior Court held that online ticket resellers qualified for immunity under Section 230 of the Communications Decency Act (CDA), and that such immunity preempted a state law consumer fraud statute. The opinion clarified the court's test for determining whether a defendant is acting as a publisher, the applicability of the CDA to e-commerce sites, and the extent of control that an online intermediary may exercise over user content without becoming an "information content provider" under the CDA. The opinion was hailed by one observer as a "rare defeat for a consumer protection agency" and the "biggest defense win of the year" in CDA § 230 litigation.

== Background ==
=== Factual background ===
TicketNetwork was a software company that operated TicketNetwork Exchange, an "online marketplace" for ticket resales. Third-party sellers (ranging from individuals to professional ticket brokers) could list tickets for sale, and buyers could search for and purchase tickets directly from these sellers. At no point did TicketNetwork possess the actual tickets for sale. Orbitz Worldwide, LLC owned CheapTickets and operated CheapTickets Exchange, an online marketplace site similar to the TicketNetwork Exchange. Orbitz entered an agreement with TicketNetwork that made CheapTickets' listings available on the TicketNetwork Exchange.

Although neither network guaranteed the accuracy of ticket listings or the availability of tickets, TicketNetwork's "Broker Guidebook" required sellers to accurately list the seat location printed on the tickets for sale, and prohibited the sale of tickets the seller did not own at the time of listing. TicketNetwork also guaranteed buyers on its Exchange a row and seat equal or better to the one purchased, and offered a full reimbursement if the tickets did not arrive in time or were not valid.

The New Jersey Division of Consumer Affairs began investigating online ticket resellers following a newspaper report that online resellers were offering tickets to a Bruce Springsteen concert a week before the show's tickets were publicly available. An investigator visited the CheapTickets site six days before the public on-sale date and purchased two tickets. When the tickets arrived, the issuing authority confirmed that they had been printed and sold several days after the investigator ordered them, on the public on-sale date.

Following the investigation, Attorney General Anne Milgram filed suit against five online ticket resellers for violations of New Jersey's Consumer Fraud Act and the state's Advertising Regulations. Milgram called the resellers' practices "plain fraud", arguing that "[y]ou can't tell consumers that you have a ticket to sell when in fact you do not have that ticket." Two of the resellers settled out-of-court, but Orbitz and TicketNetwork moved to dismiss the state's complaint, claiming immunity under a provision of the Communications Decency Act of 1996.

=== Legal background ===
New Jersey's Consumer Fraud Act § 56:8-2 makes it unlawful to use "any unconscionable commercial practice, deception, fraud, false pretense... [or] misrepresentation" intending that others will rely upon such representations "in connection with the sale or advertisement of any merchandise or real estate." The Advertising Regulations promulgated pursuant to the Consumer Fraud Act provide specific rules concerning many types of advertisement, including those involving the resale of tickets.

After the New York Supreme Court found an online service provider liable for defamation because of anonymous bulletin board posts made by its customers in Stratton Oakmont, Inc. v. Prodigy Services Co., Congress added an immunity provision to the CDA to avoid such third party liability in the future. Section 230(c)(1) of the CDA reads: "No provider or user of an interactive computer service shall be treated as the publisher or speaker of any information provided by another information content provider." Section 230(e)(3) establishes that this immunity provision preempts any inconsistent causes of action established under state or local law.

=== Arguments ===
New Jersey alleged that Orbitz and TicketNetwork committed acts of deception, fraud, misrepresentation, and other violations of the Consumer Fraud Act by advertising tickets for sale that they could not have possessed at the time they were listed, some of which referred to seats that did not exist in the concert venue. The state also claimed that Orbitz and TicketNetwork violated applicable regulations by "falsely implying that they had possession and control over the advertised tickets" and by advertising tickets for sale prior to general public availability and tickets to seats that did not exist in the concert venue.

As a defense, Orbitz and TicketNetwork argued that they were providers of an interactive computer service and their users were information content providers, so the § 230(c)(1) immunity provision preempted plaintiffs' state law claims. The state responded that Orbitz and TicketNetwork were ineligible for § 230(c)(1) immunity because the state law claims treated them as "commercial actors" rather than publishers or speakers, and because their active participation in the creation of the ticket listings qualified them as information content providers rather than merely interactive computer services.

== Issues ==
1. Were Orbitz and TicketNetwork "provider[s] or user[s] of an interactive computer service"?
2. Did the state's causes of action treat the defendants as commercial actors, or as "publisher[s] or speaker[s]"?
3. Did the defendants' involvement and control over their sites make them "information content provider[s]" for the specific listings in question?

== Opinion of the court ==
=== Providers of an interactive computer service? ===
The court found "no issue" with the claim that the defendants qualify as providers of an interactive computer service under the CDA. It cited several cases for the proposition that the category includes website operators, then concluded that this issue required "no further discussion".

=== Commercial actors or publishers? ===
The court held that the defendants' status as "commercial actors" did not deny them the protections of the CDA. The court began its discussion of this issue with a reminder that, although CDA immunity is most often used to preempt defamation claims, it has also been applied to a variety of other causes of action including housing anti-discrimination laws and negligent publication of advertisements. In the court's view, the title or wording of the cause of action is not dispositive of whether a defendant is acting as a "publisher or speaker". Rather, CDA § 230(c)(1) precludes liability where "the duty that the plaintiff alleges the defendant violated derives from the defendant's status or conduct as a 'publisher or speaker.'"

As such, the court rejected the plaintiffs' argument that the CDA did not apply because its claims treated the defendants as "commercial actors". It compared the argument to one rejected in Barnes v. Yahoo!, and quoted the Ninth Circuit court's explanation that the CDA covers "any activity that can be boiled down to deciding whether to exclude material that third parties seek to post online." The court went on to cite Donato v. Moldow, a New Jersey appellate decision holding that the CDA's language was intended to "promote the development of e-commerce" and prevent websites from being taken down by litigation. Therefore, the court concluded that the defendants' activity fell "squarely within the CDA's purview."

=== Information content providers? ===
The court rejected the state's argument that Orbitz and TicketNetwork were information content providers for the purposes of CDA § 230 immunity. First, the court discussed two other CDA § 230 cases: Donato, mentioned above, and Carafano v. Metrosplash.com, Inc. The plaintiff in Donato argued that the defendant became an information content provider by selectively deleting certain posts from the bulletin board he operated, thereby shaping the content of the forum. The New Jersey Appellate Division court disagreed, finding that the defendant exercised "a publisher's traditional editorial functions," which are "the very conduct Congress chose to immunize by § 230," and held that he qualified for immunity. In Carafano, the defendant operated a dating website that required users to fill in a standard form, including several multiple-choice questions, in order to complete their profiles. The plaintiff argued that, by determining in advance which answers its users could choose, the defendant participated in the "development" of the information, making him an information content provider. The Ninth Circuit court rejected this theory, holding that a defendant's editing or selection do not render him a provider as long as the "essential" content is provided by a third party.

Next, the court examined the control that Orbitz and TicketNetwork exercised over their sites' content. Orbitz's control was largely formal, with requirements as to where Orbitz's name, logos, and other design elements should be located, but Orbitz also retained the ability to insert certain links and request removal of content. TicketNetwork provided payment services, customer service, and confirmation emails, and performed some level of verification of events and brokers.

Finally, the court concluded that the Orbitz and TicketNetwork were not information content providers. In its view, the defendants' actions were "nothing more than the exercise of a publisher's traditional editorial functions," as in Donato and Carafano. The inaccurate/misleading ticket information originated not from defendants, but from third-party sellers. The court distinguished Fair Housing Council of San Fernando Valley v. Roommates.com, LLC, a case in which the defendant service was denied CDA § 230 immunity because it was "actively participating in the objectionable content" by requiring users to provide certain information in violation of a state anti-discrimination statute in order to register. Here, the objectionable content complained of (the fraudulent listings) was not supplied, required, or requested by the defendants, who provided a mere interface that did not violate any laws in and of itself. The court also distinguished NPS LLC v. StubHub, Inc., another case involving online ticket sales, because the defendants in that case "materially contributed to the illegal 'ticket scalping' of its sellers."

=== Disposition ===
The court granted the defendants' motions for summary judgment, finding that they "help to create and maintain a vibrant, competitive, market" for consumers of travel and concert tickets shopping online, consistent with Congress's intent in enacting § 230 of the CDA.
