= FOSTA-SESTA =

US communications/sex trafficking bills

- Long title: A bill to amend the Communications Act of 1934 to clarify that section 230 of such Act does not prohibit the enforcement against providers and users of interactive computer services of Federal and State criminal and civil law relating to sexual exploitation of children or sex trafficking, and for other purposes.
- Enacted by: the 115th United States Congress

Citations
- Public law: Pub. L. 115–164 (text) (PDF)

Legislative history
- Introduced in the House of Representatives as H.R. 1865 by Ann Wagner (R–MO) on April 3, 2017; Committee consideration by House Judiciary Committee and House Energy and Commerce Committee; Passed the House of Representatives on February 27, 2018 (388-25); Passed the Senate on March 21, 2018 (97-2); Signed into law by President Donald Trump on April 11, 2018

FOSTA (Allow States and Victims to Fight Online Sex Trafficking Act) and SESTA (Stop Enabling Sex Traffickers Act) are U.S. Senate and House bills which became law on April 11, 2018. They clarify the country's sex trafficking law to make it illegal to knowingly assist, facilitate, or support sex trafficking, and amend Section 230 of the Communications Decency Act (which protects providers and users of online services from civil liability for information or content provided by a third-party user) to exclude enforcement of federal or state sex trafficking laws from its immunity. Senate sponsor Rob Portman had previously led an investigation into the online classifieds service Backpage (which had been accused of facilitating child sex trafficking) in 2015, and argued that Section 230 was protecting its "unscrupulous business practices" and was not designed to provide immunity to websites that facilitate sex trafficking.

SESTA received bipartisan support from U.S. senators, tech lobbying group the Internet Association, as well as companies such as 21st Century Fox and Oracle, who supported the bill's goal to encourage proactive action against illegal sex trafficking. SESTA was criticized by pro-free speech groups for weakening section 230 safe harbors, alleging that it would make providers become liable for any usage of their platforms that facilitates sex trafficking, knowingly if they moderate for such content, and with reckless disregard if they do not proactively take steps to prevent such usage.

SESTA was incorporated into the House version of the bill with the "Allow States and Victims to Fight Online Sex Trafficking Act" (FOSTA) and the joint proposal was known as the "FOSTA-SESTA package". On February 27, 2018, the FOSTA-SESTA package was passed in the House of Representatives with a vote of 388–25. On March 21, 2018, the FOSTA-SESTA package bill passed the Senate with a vote of 97–2, with only senators Ron Wyden and Rand Paul voting against it. The bill was signed into law by President Donald Trump on April 11, 2018.

== Overview ==
Section 230 was established in 1996, making the providers and users of "interactive computer services" immune from civil liability for objectionable content (such as defamatory and obscene content) provided by a third-party. Section 230 has been considered a key piece of Internet legislation, as operators of online services that handle user-generated content are not liable for civil wrongs committed by their users, if the service was not directly involved in the offending content. As described by Sarah Jeong of The Verge, "For example, Twitter, Inc. cannot be sued if one of its users defames another user." The provisions of Section 230 do not apply to intellectual property law, which is instead covered by the Digital Millennium Copyright Act, nor do they provide a shield from federal criminal liability — including federal laws regarding child abuse material and exploitation.

The Stop Advertising Victims of Exploitation (SAVE) Act made it illegal to advertise sex trafficking, knowingly benefit financially from participation in a venture that advertises sex trafficking, and to engage in activities related to sex trafficking besides advertising, knowingly or in reckless disregard of the fact that sex trafficking is involved.

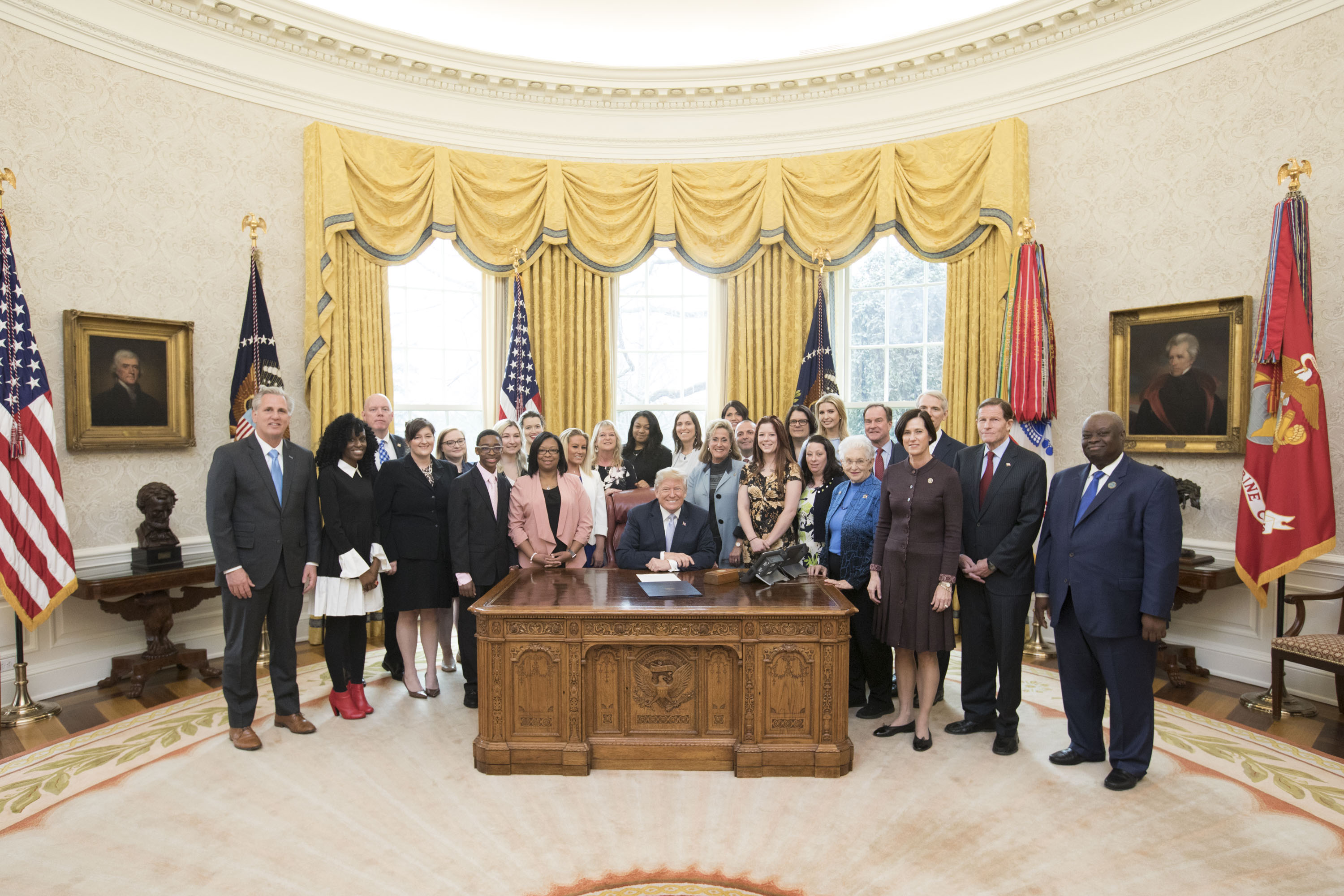
President Trump signing the Stop Enabling Sex Traffickers Act into law

In an op-ed, Portman cited numbers from the National Center for Missing and Exploited Children, which showed an 846% increase in reports of suspected child sex trafficking to the organization from 2010 to 2015. He attributed this largely to Backpage, an online classifieds service that had been accused of knowingly accepting ads which facilitated child sex trafficking, and filtered specific keywords in order to obfuscate it. The site had faced legal disputes, and a government investigation spearheaded by Portman.

Portman argued that Section 230 was being used to "protect its unscrupulous business practices", and that Section 230 protections "were never intended to apply – and they should not apply – to companies that knowingly facilitate sex trafficking."

Despite a series of several unsuccessful lawsuits attempting to eliminate the "adult services" section of Backpage or have shut down the website entirely, most of which had been dismissed on First Amendment freedom of speech or Section 230 protection grounds, in January 2017, Backpage ultimately decided to shut down the site's "adult" section anyway, citing "overwhelming pressure from the government."

The Stop Enabling Sex Traffickers Act amends Section 1591 of Title 18 of the United States Code to add a definition of "participation in a venture", as knowingly assisting, facilitating, or supporting sex trafficking. It amends section 230 of Title 47 of the United States Code to state that it is policy to "ensure vigorous enforcement of Federal criminal and civil law relating to sex trafficking", and that section 230 does not impair enforcement of "any State criminal prosecution or civil enforcement action targeting conduct that violates a Federal criminal law prohibiting [sex trafficking]", nor "impair the enforcement or limit the application of section 1595 of title 18, United States Code."

== Reaction ==
=== Support ===
==== Congress ====
SESTA was co-sponsored by 27 Democratic and Republican senators; early supporters of the bill included members of the Permanent Subcommittee on Investigations, which was chaired by Portman and led the aforementioned investigation into Backpage. Representative Mimi Walters stated that websites such as Backpage have become the "storefronts" for the modern-day slave trade and that the FOSTA-SESTA legislation will help prosecutors "crack down on websites that promote sex trafficking" as well as provide recourse for victims. Representative Carolyn Maloney (D-NY) stated her support for the FOSTA-SESTA package, believing that "Congress must act to clarify that Section 230 of the Communications Decency Act was never meant to shield sex traffickers."

==== Advocacy groups ====
The New Jersey Coalition Against Human Trafficking called the FOSTA-SESTA package a "groundbreaking bill" in the effort to bring justice to victims. The FOSTA-SESTA package is also supported by other members of advocacy groups such as ECPAT Executive Director Carol Smolenski, Operation Texas Shield founder John Clark, and Faith & Freedom Coalition Executive Director Timothy Head.

==== Corporations ====
21st Century Fox and Oracle Corporation have pledged support for the bill; Oracle vice president Kenneth Glueck stated that it would "establish some measure of accountability for those that cynically sell advertising but are unprepared to help curtail sex trafficking". Fox stated that "everyone that does business in this medium has a civic responsibility to help stem illicit and illegal activity. While it is impossible to formulate laws to govern every possible situation, [the] legislation is a rational and measured effort to deal with a tragic and pernicious problem that is global in scope."

=== Criticism ===
==== U.S. Department of Justice ====
Writing on behalf of the U.S. Department of Justice, Assistant-Attorney General Stephen Boyd addressed Chairman of the House Judiciary Committee, Bob Goodlatte, expressing concerns that provisions of the bill would make it even harder to prosecute sex traffickers. Additionally, he expressed concerns that certain provisions would violate the Constitution's ex post facto clause and thus be unconstitutional.

==== Congress ====
Opposition to the bill was voiced by members of Congress as well. In an official statement Senator Ron Wyden stated, "I continue to be deeply troubled that this bill’s approach will make it harder to catch dangerous criminals, that it will favor big tech companies at the expense of startups and that it will stifle innovation." The only other Senator to oppose the bill was Rand Paul.

==== Advocacy groups ====
SESTA has been criticized on free speech grounds and by advocacy groups due to concerns about disproportionate impact and disruptions to the lives of sex workers. Pro-free speech and pro-Internet groups, including the Woodhull Freedom Foundation, the Center for Democracy and Technology, Electronic Frontier Foundation (EFF), the ACLU, Engine Advocacy, the Sex Workers Outreach Project (SWOP), and the Wikimedia Foundation, argue that the bill weakens the Section 230 safe harbors, and places an unnecessary burden on internet companies and intermediaries that handle user-generated content or communications. EFF staff attorney Aaron Mackey told the Washington Examiner that under SESTA, service providers would be required to proactively take action against sex trafficking activities, and would need a "team of lawyers" to evaluate all possible scenarios under state and federal law (which may be financially unfeasible for smaller companies).

Sex workers argued that SESTA would harm their safety, as the online platforms they utilize for offering and discussing sexual services (as an alternative to street prostitution) had begun to reduce their services or shut down entirely due to the threat of liability under SESTA. Others have demonstrated how the platforms that still facilitate sex work have increased their prices and engaged in more exploitative practices, leaving sex workers with limited bargaining power. Some also argued that SESTA incorrectly assumes that most or all women providing sexual services are victimized, and that the law is simply designed to raise the barrier to entry for legitimate sex workers, while failing to protect victims. Social media hashtag campaigns emerged to advocate against the bill for these reasons, such as #LetUsSurvive and #SurvivorsAgainstSESTA.

In its original form, the bill defined "participation in a venture" as "knowing conduct by an individual or entity, by any means". The EFF and the Internet Association argued that any online service could theoretically be used to "facilitate" sex trafficking, and that the law would have a chilling effect on voluntary content moderation of websites (as encouraged by the "Good Samaritan provision" of section 230, which states that providers are not liable on account of "any action voluntarily taken in good faith to restrict access to or availability of material that the provider or user considers to be [objectionable]"), as even the mere discovery of sex trafficking content could constitute knowing conduct of participation in a venture, and that dismissing the risk could constitute reckless disregard. The Senate voted down a proposed amendment by Ron Wyden, which would have clarified the law to ensure that moderation does not contribute to liability. The Consumer Technology Association stated that SESTA was well-intentioned but could "create a trial lawyer bonanza of overly-broad civil lawsuits".

The EFF further argued that websites which knowingly facilitate sex trafficking were already liable per Fair Housing Council of San Fernando Valley v. Roommates.com, LLC, which ruled that Section 230 immunity does not apply if an online service was directly involved in the creation of content that violates civil law, and because Section 230 has never provided protection from federal criminal law.

In late March 2018, before the Senate had voted on the bill, and early April 2018, following the bill's passage but prior to its implementation, courts in Massachusetts and Florida made rulings affirming that Backpage was liable for facilitating sex trafficking after an investigation uncovered information suggesting that the website not only knew that their users were posting sex trafficking ads to their website, but that the company also took affirmative steps to help those ads get posted.

The Internet Association stated that it would "support targeted amendments to the Communications Decency Act that would allow victims of sex trafficking crimes to seek justice against perpetrators", but initially criticized SESTA for using terms which were undefined or broadly-interpreted in case law, and argued that it would "introduce new legal risk not just for internet services that do not knowingly and intentionally facilitate illegal conduct, but also create risk for an incredibly broad number of innocent businesses by expanding the notion of contributory liability."

The Internet Association pledged support for SESTA on November 3, 2017 after an agreement to clarify portions of it; in particular, the definition of "participation in a venture" was amended to replace "knowing conduct by an individual or entity, by any means, that assists, supports, or facilitates a violation" with just "knowingly assisting, supporting, or facilitating a violation".

==== Corporations ====
Initially, The Internet Association (which represents Facebook, Google, Microsoft, and other tech companies) voiced opposition to the bill. However, after coming to a compromise on the wording of one section, they withdrew their opposition. The proposed bill originally defined participation as "knowing conduct, by an individual or entity, by any means, that assists, supports or facilitates a violation of sex trafficking laws" and was amended to "knowingly assisting, supporting, or facilitating a violation".

==== Media ====
Several media sources have described FOSTA-SESTA as a failure which has "only put sex workers in danger and wasted taxpayer money".

Government Accountability Office report

A June 2021 report from the Government Accountability Office reported that "Criminal restitution has not been sought and civil damages have not been awarded under section 3 of FOSTA". The report also found that only one civil case had sought damages under FOSTA, and that case was dismissed. Only crimes committed since FOSTA was signed can be prosecuted, and where it does apply, prosecutors have found racketeering and money laundering charges successful, leading to FOSTA's limited use in criminal cases. Possible reasons given by the GAO for the infrequent use of FOSTA in civil cases include the "new and untested" nature of the civil remedy provision and the DOJ seizure of Backpage.com, which occurred days before the law was signed and may have contributed to the dissolution of many commercial sex platforms.

== FOSTA-SESTA package ==
On February 21, 2018, representative Ann Wagner (R-MO) issued a press release stating that the bill she sponsored, H.R. 1865, the Allow States and Victims to Fight Online Sex Trafficking Act (FOSTA), would be put on the House floor the week of February 26, 2018. According to Wagner, the bill was expected to be considered with an amendment from representative Mimi Walters (R-CA) that included victim-centered provisions from SESTA.

Like SESTA, the FOSTA-SESTA package would clarify that section 230 of the CDA does not prevent states and victims of sex trafficking from pursuing a course of action against interactive computer service providers, such as Backpage. Wagner said she believed that "[o]nline trafficking is flourishing because there are no serious, legal consequences" for websites that profit from sex trafficking and that the "FOSTA-SESTA package will finally give prosecutors the tools they need to protect their communities and give victims a pathway to justice."

== Response ==
Craigslist ceased offering its "Personals" section within all US domains in response to the bill's passing, stating "Any tool or service can be misused. We can't take such risk without jeopardizing all our other services." Furry personals website Pounced.org voluntarily shut down, citing increased liability under the bill, and the difficulty of monitoring all the listings on the site for a small organization.

The effectiveness of the bill has come into question, as it has purportedly endangered sex workers and has been ineffective in catching and stopping sex traffickers. Opponents have claimed the law does not directly address issues that contribute to sex trafficking, but instead has drastically limited the tools available for law enforcement to seek surviving victims of sex trade. The sex worker community has also been severely affected by the law, with sex workers losing access to online safety resources, facing financial hardship, and even going missing or dying because of the law. Similar consequences of the law's enactment have been reported internationally.

A number of policy changes enacted by the popular social networks Facebook and Tumblr (the latter having been well known for having liberal policies regarding adult content) to restrict the posting of sexual content on their respective platforms have also been cited as examples of proactive censorship in the wake of the law, and a wider pattern of increased targeted censorship towards LGBT communities.

In January 2020, Senator Elizabeth Warren introduced a bill meant to study the FOSTA-SESTA package titled the SAFE SEX Workers Study Act. However, the bill died in the Senate committee on Health, Education, Labor, and Pensions.

In 2021, The Hill reported that opposition to the bill had resulted in sex workers gaining support from a minority of Democratic lawmakers.

On August 24, 2021, Wilhan Martono, the previous owner of the now-defunct website CityxGuide, pleaded guilty to one count of promotion of prostitution and reckless disregard of sex trafficking, and one count of conspiracy to engage in interstate transportation in aid of racketeering enterprises and facilitating prostitution. Martono's plea is the first ever instance in which a defendant has pleaded guilty to violating FOSTA.

== Legal challenges ==
On June 18, 2018, the Electronic Frontier Foundation (EFF) filed a federal lawsuit challenging the constitutionality of the law (Woodhull Freedom Foundation, et al. v. U.S.), on behalf of the Internet Archive, Human Rights Watch, the Woodhull Freedom Foundation, Eric Koszyk, and Alex Andrews. The lawsuit argued that FOSTA is unconstitutionally overbroad and unconstitutionally vague.

On September 24, 2018, Judge Richard J. Leon dismissed the EFF's constitutional challenge against FOSTA for lack of standing. On the EFF's appeal, the Court of Appeals for the D.C. Circuit reversed the lower court ruling on the matter of standing and sent the case back to the lower court on January 24, 2020.

On March 29, 2022, Judge Richard J. Leon again dismissed the EFF's constitutional challenge against FOSTA, ruling that the EFF's arguments about FOSTA's unconstitutionality were without merit. On April 25, 2022, the EFF filed a notice of appeal. But on July 07, 2023, the Court of Appeals for the D.C. Circuit rejected the EFF’s appeal and affirmed the district court’s ruling, agreeing that FOSTA-SESTA is not unconstitutionally overbroad or vague.

On January 5, 2021, Judge David C. Godbey of the United States District Court North District of Texas upheld the constitutionality of FOSTA, ruling that the statute is neither unconstitutionally overbroad nor unconstitutionally vague. His ruling was a response to a constitutional challenge brought by the defendant in the case of United States v. Martono, a criminal matter relating to the seizure of CityxGuide.

== GAO report ==
The law required the Government Accountability Office (GAO) to conduct a study three years after enactment. The GAO report found two events in April 2018 disrupted the landscape of the online commercial sex market. First, federal authorities seized the largest online platform for buying and selling commercial sex, backpage.com. Second, FOSTA was enacted. These events led many who controlled platforms in this market to relocate their platforms overseas. Additionally, with backpage.com no longer in the market, buyers and sellers moved to other online platforms, and the market became fragmented. From 2014 through 2020, the Department of Justice (DOJ) brought at least 11 criminal cases against those who control platforms in this market, including three cases against those who control backpage.com.

The current landscape of the online commercial sex market heightens already-existing challenges law enforcement face in gathering tips and evidence. Specifically, gathering tips and evidence to investigate and prosecute those who control or use online platforms has become more difficult due to the relocation of platforms overseas, platforms' use of complex payment systems, and the increased use of social media platforms.

Criminal restitution has not been sought and civil damages have not been awarded under section 3 of FOSTA. In June 2020, DOJ brought one case under the criminal provision established by section 3 of FOSTA for aggravated violations involving the promotion of prostitution of five or more people or acting in reckless disregard of sex trafficking. As of March 2021, restitution had not been sought or awarded. According to DOJ officials, prosecutors have not brought more cases with charges under section 3 of FOSTA because the law is relatively new and prosecutors have had success using other criminal statutes. Finally, in November 2020 one individual sought civil damages under a number of constitutional and statutory provisions, including section 3 of FOSTA. However, in March 2021, the court dismissed the case without awarding damages after it had granted defendants' motions to dismiss.

== See also ==
- Switter
- Online dating service safety issues
