= CheapTickets =

American travel services company

- Type: Subsidiary
- Industry: Online travel services
- Founded: 1986; 40 years ago in Honolulu, Hawaii
- Founder: Michael J. Hartley; Sandra Hartley
- Headquarters: Chicago, Illinois, United States
- Key people: Barney Harford (president and CEO); Marsha C. Williams (CFO); Mike Nelson (COO)
- Parent: Expedia Group
- Website: www.cheaptickets.com

CheapTickets is an online travel services company focusing on the leisure market, offering airline tickets, hotel and vacation rentals, rental cars, customized vacation packages, and cruises. CheapTickets was a wholly owned subsidiary of Orbitz Worldwide, Inc., and with Expedia Inc.'s purchase of Orbitz, it is now a subsidiary of Expedia Group.

== History ==
CheapTickets was founded in 1986 in Honolulu, Hawaii, by Michael and Sandra Hartley when inter-island carrier Mid Pacific Air gave 3,000 tickets to Hartley's employer at the time, advertising firm Regency Media, as payment for its services at the time Regency closed its Honolulu branch. The tickets were advertised via newspaper classified ads and sold out in two weeks. The company grew into an airline ticket consolidator, acquiring seats from airlines at rates low enough to allow the company to resell them at fares lower than the airline's normal published airfares.

It opened its first call center in Honolulu in 1987, and would later open call centers in Colorado Springs, Colorado; Lakeport, California; Los Angeles, California; and Tampa, Florida. It launched its web site in 1997, becoming a pioneer in Internet travel sales. The company operated brick and mortar agency locations in Hawaii, California, New York, and Washington, which were closed by the end of 2003, by which time they accounted for 2 percent of the company's business.

The company was acquired in 2000 by Cendant. In July 2006, it was included, with the sale of Travelport to the Blackstone Group, as part of their Travel Distribution Services Division that later became Orbitz Worldwide, Inc.

In 2009, Orbitz was sued by the state of New Jersey for alleged violations of the state's Consumer Fraud Act relating to tickets offered for sale on CheapTickets Exchange for a Bruce Springsteen concert prior to the first public sale date. The company successfully claimed immunity under Section 230 of the Communications Decency Act, and Milgram v. Orbitz was dismissed.
