= Jane Doe No. 14 v. Internet Brands, Inc. =

- Court: United States Court of Appeals for the Ninth Circuit
- Full case name: Jane Doe No. 14 v. Internet Brands, Inc., DBA Modelmayhem.com
- Argued: February 7, 2014
- Reargued: March 8, 2015
- Decided: May 31, 2016
- Citation: 824 F. 3d 846

Case history
- Prior history: Appeal from C.D. Cal.

Holding
- Section 230 of the Communications Decency Act does not bar claims against online service providers regarding criminal offenses by their users.

Court membership
- Judges sitting: Mary M. Schroeder, Richard R. Clifton, Brian M. Cogan

Case opinions
- Majority: Richard R. Clifton

Laws applied
- Section 230 of the Communications Decency Act

Jane Doe No. 14 v. Internet Brands, Inc., 824 F. 3d 846 (9th Cir., 2016), is a ruling at the Ninth Circuit Court of Appeals on the legal liability of an Internet service provider for criminal offenses committed by its users. The ultimate ruling in the case has caused confusion over the amount of liability faced by service providers during such incidents.

== Background ==
Jane Doe (a pseudonym) was a member of Model Mayhem, a networking website for aspiring models owned by Internet Brands. Another user lured her into a fake modeling audition and then drugged and raped her, recording the incident for a pornographic video. In 2012, Doe filed a lawsuit against Internet Brands alleging negligence under California law, claiming a failure to warn regarding the risks of using the Model Mayhem service.

Doe alleged that Internet Brands had known of the criminal activity amongst the site's users. and sought $10 million in damages. This allegation was based on the fact that two people had already been arrested for similar activity at the site. In 2007, Emerson Callum and Lavont Flanders were arrested for luring and victimizing at least five women in a scheme similar to the one used by Doe's rapist. In 2011, Callum and Flanders were convicted of sex trafficking and sentenced to twelve consecutive life terms in prison. However, while Doe's case was in progress, Internet Brands claimed that they did not know about the Callum and Flanders case and other criminal activity at the Model Mayhem site, having purchased the site in 2008 and not being informed of the litigation by the previous owners.

== District court ruling ==
The United States District Court for the Central District of California ruled in 2012 that Internet Brands was not liable for informing users, such as Doe, of potential dangers as the company was protected under Section 230 of the Communications Decency Act, which shields online service providers from legal liability regarding the behavior of their third-party users.

Citing Doe v. MySpace, Inc., Judge John F. Walter concluded that based on "well-settled authority", Internet Brands did not have a duty to warn its users of harm. The interpretation of the court was that Section 230 grants immunity to all web-based service providers for civil claims brought by a user for harm caused by another user. The court further concluded that immunity still applies even when there is actual knowledge of the alleged tortious or criminal conduct by third-party users.

== Circuit court ruling ==
Jane Doe appealed the district court ruling to the Ninth Circuit Court of Appeals. In 2014, the circuit court initially reversed the district court ruling, holding that Section 230 did not in fact bar Doe's claim against Internet Brands. The case was remanded to the district court to allow a trial against Internet Brands to proceed.

The circuit court determined that Doe's failure to warn claim against Internet Brands was within the scope of Section 230, which does not only apply to user-generated content. The court held that Section 230 allows "Good Samaritan" blocking and removal of troubling user-generated material by service providers without damaging their immunity against liability for that material. The court found that Internet Brands was responsible under this provision for warning users of possible danger from using the Model Mayhem site.

Despite precedents holding that online service providers are immune from legal liability for various type of user behavior, the circuit court held that under Barnes v. Yahoo!, Inc., there has never been a ruling stating that Section 230 provides general immunity from all types of claims.

After facing some criticism about how this ruling contradicted others on Section 230 immunity, the Ninth Circuit withdrew its September 2014 decision and agreed to rehear the case in 2015. In 2016 the court ruled in favor of Jane Doe again, noting in particular the "novel issue" that Section 230 did not expressly bar a failure to warn claim when the service is aware of previous criminal activity arising from usage of the website. Once again, the circuit court remanded the case to the district court for a new trial against Internet Brands. At that proceeding, Internet Brands was able to have the case dismissed, as Doe failed to argue that the company committed negligence under California law, but no reference was made to CDA Section 230.

== Impact ==
Despite failing to achieve a ruling against Internet Brands, Jeff Herman, the plaintiff's lawyer, described the circuit court ruling as "a landmark opinion and a major victory for victims of sexual abuse because for the first time ever websites can be held liable for failing to protect their users from a known danger. I think it has far-reaching implications for the Internet."

There has been criticism of the Ninth Circuit decision. Santa Clara Law School professor Eric Goldman and lawyer Venkat Balasubramani stated that the decision appears contrary to the text of Section 230 and all other cases that previously dealt with liability among service providers, particularly Doe v. MySpace Inc. Goldman feared that this ruling implies that websites can face legal liability simply for allowing people to talk to each other. Balasubramani believed this will cause networks to self-censor in their own operations and over-censor the speech of their users.
