= Switter =

Defunct social networking site for sex workers

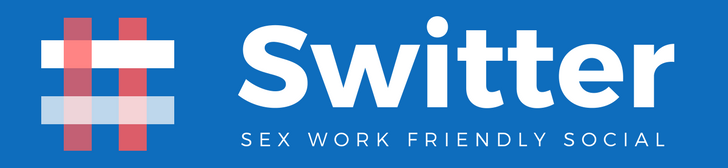
- Website type: Social network
- Founded: 28 March 2018; 8 years ago
- Dissolved: 14 March 2022; 4 years ago
- Owner: Assembly Four
- Website: switter.at
- Users: 435,490

Switter was a social networking website for sex workers. It was an instance of the Mastodon federated social network.

== History ==
Switter was founded on 28 March 2018 by Assembly Four – an organisation in Melbourne, Australia – and operated as an instance of the federated social network Mastodon. It experienced a surge of new users following the seizure of Backpage on 6 April, reaching 26,000 profiles by 11 April making it the sixth largest Mastodon server.

After 3 weeks of operation, it was publicly unavailable following Cloudflare withdrawing their services to Switter on 18 April 2018, after the passage of the FOSTA and SESTA bills in the United States. Speaking to Vice Media, Cloudflare said that banning Switter was "related to [their] attempts to understand FOSTA", further describing the legislation as "a very bad law [setting] a very dangerous precedent". Switter was subsequently transferred to a different platform.

By June 2018, it had 100,000 users, almost reaching 200,000 that December, with Tumblr's restriction of adult material cited as a factor.

=== Closure ===
On 14 February 2022, Assembly Four announced that Switter would be discontinued the following month on 14 March, in part due to the passage of the Online Safety Act in Australia along with similar legislation such as the British Online Safety Bill (subsequently passed in 2023). It had 435,490 members and, during the final month of operation, the creation of new user accounts was disabled. Digital Rights Watch, an Australian digital rights advocacy group, described pressure to terminate Switter as "systematic silencing of the parts of Australian society that the government does not wish to exist".

== Reception ==
While Switter was noted as a safe haven for sex workers displaced from other platforms like Twitter and Instagram through terms of service and anti-sex work legislation, its lack of end-to-end encryption on direct messages was criticised as vulnerable to data breaches. The lower number of prospective clients on Switter compared to Backpage during its existence was also cited as an impediment to vetting them.
