= Dart v. Craigslist, Inc. =

Thomas Dart, Sheriff of Cook County v. Craigslist, Inc.
- Decided: October 20, 2009
- Citation: 665 F. Supp. 2d 961

Holding
- The Court granted Craigslist's motion for judgment on the pleadings, holding that it was immune from liability pursuant to Section 230(c) of the Communications Decency Act.

Court membership
- Judge sitting: John F. Grady

Keywords
- Section 230 of the Communications Decency Act

Thomas Dart, Sheriff of Cook County v. Craigslist, Inc., 665 F. Supp. 2d 961 (N.D. Ill. Oct. 20, 2009), is a decision by the United States District Court for the Northern District of Illinois in which the court held that Craigslist, as an Internet service provider, was immune from wrongs committed by their users under Section 230 of the Communications Decency Act (CDA). Sheriff Thomas Dart had sought to hold Craigslist responsible for allegedly illegal content posted by users in Craigslist's erotic services section, but Section 230(c)(1) of the CDA provides that "no provider or user of an interactive computer service shall be treated as the publisher or speaker of any information provided by another information content provider."

== Factual and procedural background ==
Plaintiff Thomas Dart is Sheriff of Cook County, Illinois, which includes Chicago. He was named to Time Magazine's "100 Most Influential" list in 2009 for his innovative approach to law enforcement.

From January 2007 through November 2008, Sheriff Dart's department expended 3,120 man hours and approximately $105,081 investigating postings which appeared to be offers for prostitution on the "erotic services" section of the Craigslist website. The police arrested 156 people in association with their activity on the erotic services section of Craigslist during this period.

Craigslist required those posting ads to agree to its "Terms of Use," which prohibited posting unlawful content. Before accessing the erotic services section, users also received a "warning & disclaimer," which stated that users agree to flag content that violates the Terms of Use including "offers for or the solicitation of prostitution."

Despite Craigslist's efforts to prevent the posting of unlawful content, Sheriff Dart alleged that users frequently posted unlawful content in the erotic services category. In fact, the website had become a valuable source of information for law enforcement uncovering prostitution rings. Sheriff Dart stated that he had sent letters to Craigslist requesting that it either take down the erotic services section or provide greater policing of it, but Craigslist did not respond. He further stated, "I could make arrests off Craigslist 24 hours a day, but to what end? I'm trying to go up the ladder."

Sheriff Dart filed suit against Craigslist on March 5, 2009, alleging that its erotic services section was a public nuisance because it facilitated prostitution. The complaint charged that Craigslist was "the single largest source of prostitution in the nation." He sought compensation for his police department's expenditures on Craigslist-related prostitution and punitive damages. He also requested an injunction requiring Craigslist to desist the complained-of conduct.

Craigslist moved for judgment on the pleadings, contending that it was immune from liability pursuant to Section 230(c) of the Communications Decency Act.

== Court ruling ==
Craigslist asserted its immunity from Sheriff Dart's claims on the grounds of Section 230(c)(1) of the Communications Decency Act, which provides immunity from liability for providers and users of an "interactive computer service" who publish information provided by others.

Section 230(c): Protection for "good samaritan" blocking and screening of offensive material

(1) Treatment of publisher or speaker—No provider or user of an interactive computer service shall be treated as the publisher or speaker of any information provided by another information content provider.

Applying § 230(c)(1) to Sheriff Dart's Public-Nuisance Claim

Sheriff Dart alleged that Craigslist actually committed unlawful acts by knowingly arranging prostitutions and directing users to places of prostitution. The court, however, refused to accept this argument because Craigslist did not create these ads, citing Chicago Lawyers' Committee For Civil Rights Under Law v. Craigslist, 519 F.3d at 671 (7th Cir. 2008) (noting that Craigslist had not authored the discriminatory ads and "could not be treated as the 'speaker' of the posters' words, given § 230(c)(1)."). The court further noted that "intermediaries are not culpable for 'aiding and abetting' their customers who misuse their services to commit unlawful acts."

The court also refused to accept the argument that Craigslist caused or induced its users to post unlawful ads merely by supplying the erotic category and an associated search mechanism, stating that "the phrase 'adult,' even in conjunction with 'services,' is not unlawful in itself nor does it necessarily call for unlawful content." The court's analysis was not swayed by the apparent ineffectiveness of Craigslist's guidelines. The court concluded that "Section 230(c)(1) would serve little if any purpose if companies like Craigslist were found liable under state law for 'causing' or 'inducing' users to post unlawful content in this fashion."

== Changes to the Craigslist's erotic services category ==
After Dart filed suit, Craigslist voluntarily altered its erotic service category. Craigslist renamed the category from "erotic" to "adult", applied a "manual review process" on all submissions to the adult category, and reduced the number of subcategories from 21 to five.

== Reaction ==
This case was viewed as a win for Internet speech.

"As Congress has recognized, if an Internet proprietor had to police every posting that a third party put up, the cost would be enormous – and it would likely stifle communications." The New York Times Editorial Section

"It was nice to see such a clean and decisive opinion—and a little ironic, as our law enforcement officials, who are supposed to enforce the laws rather than bypass them, got schooled in the limits of their legal authority." Eric Goldman, Technology and Marketing Law Blog, October 29, 2009.

Some commentators felt, that Dart’s attack on Craigslist was hypocritical, considering that it was Craigslist’s cooperation with law enforcement that enabled his and other sheriffs’ offices around the country to prosecute illegal sex work and human traffickers.

== See also ==
- Miller v. California
- Miller test
- Florence v. Shurtleff
