= Fair Housing Council of San Fernando Valley v. Roommates.com, LLC =

2008 United States court case

Fair Housing Council of San Fernando Valley v. Roommates.com
- Court: United States Court of Appeals for the Ninth Circuit
- Full case name: Fair Housing Council of San Fernando Valley v. Roommates.com, LLC
- Argued: December 12 2007
- Decided: April 3 2008
- Citation: 521 F.3d 1157

Case history
- Prior history: 489 F.3d 921 (9th Cir. 2007); 2004 WL 3799488 (C.D. Cal. 2004).

Holding
- The Ninth Circuit, en banc, upheld the three judge panel’s holding. It found that the portion of the Roommates.com website that presented a questionnaire to users was not immune under Section 230 of the CDA because Roommates.com was considered an information content provider, and the questions violated the FHA. However, the portion of the website labeled “Additional Comments” qualified for immunity because Roommates.com was not considered an information content provider for this information.

Court membership
- Judges sitting: Alex Kozinski, Stephen Reinhardt, Pamela Ann Rymer, Barry G. Silverman, M. Margaret McKeown, William A. Fletcher, Raymond C. Fisher, Richard A. Paez, Carlos Bea, Milan D. Smith, Jr., N. Randy Smith
- Chief judge: Alex Kozinski

Case opinions
- Majority: Alex Kozinski
- Dissent: M. Margaret McKeown

Laws applied
- Communications Decency Act, Section 230 of the Communications Decency Act, Fair Housing Act

Fair Housing Council of San Fernando Valley v. Roommates.com, LLC, 521 F.3d 1157 (9th Cir. 2008), is a case in which the United States Court of Appeals for the Ninth Circuit, sitting en banc, held that immunity under Section 230 of the Communications Decency Act (CDA) did not apply to an interactive online operator whose questionnaire violated the Fair Housing Act. However, the court found that Roommates.com was immune under Section 230 of the CDA for the “additional comments” portion of the website. This case was the first to place a limit on the broad immunity that Section 230(c) gives to service providers that has been established under Zeran v. AOL (1997).

== Background ==
Defendant, Roommates.com, is a website that operates to match individuals renting rooms with those who need rooms. At the time of the suit, Roommates.com had approximately 150,000 room listings. In order to use the site, users had to create a profile by answering a series of questions provided by Roommates.com. These questions included the user's name, whereabouts, and email address, and also included questions about gender, sexual orientation, number of children, and whether the children lived with the user. Users were also prompted to state the type of roommate they were looking for in terms of these last three questions. Finally, there was an “Additional Comments” section where users could further describe what they were looking for in a roommate.

Fair Housing Council of San Fernando Valley brought an action against the website Roommates.com, alleging that the website violated the Fair Housing Act, and the California Fair Housing Act Section 12955 by allowing users the ability to discriminate through the website's questionnaires.

Roommates.com argued that Section 230(c) of the CDA granted the website immunity, because it was simply an interactive website, and not an information content provider.

== Section 230 ==
Congress passed Section 230 of the Communications Decency Act in response to the holding in Stratton Oakmont, Inc. v. Prodigy Services Co.. In Stratton, the court held the service provider Prodigy liable as a publisher, because it deleted material that it thought was offensive, but had not deleted other material that was potentially offensive.

To avoid crushing liability for service providers, Congress provided section 230(c) immunity. Section 230 of the Communications Decency Act (also known as the “good Samaritan provision”), grants immunity to an internet service provider, as long the content is created solely by third parties. Specifically, section 230(c)(1) states that “[n]o provider . . . of an interactive computer service shall be treated as a publisher or speaker of any information provided by another information content provider.”

In contrast, information content providers who are “responsible in whole or in part, for the creation or development of” the infringing material. are not immune under section 230(c), and may be held liable for defamatory content.

== Prior history ==
=== District Court ===
The United States District Court for the Central District of California granted Roommates.com's motion for summary judgment, holding that Section 230(c) of the CDA made the website immune from Fair Housing Act violations. The court reasoned that Section 230(c) immunity is quite expansive, and that in this case Roommates.com was an internet service provider, but was not an information content provider. Therefore, the court found that Roommates.com qualified for Section 230(c) immunity.

=== Ninth Circuit panel decision ===
The court reversed the district court's decision in part, and remanded for a determination whether the website violated the Fair Housing Act. It also vacated the dismissal of the state law claims. In a decision written by Chief Judge Alex Kozinski, a three-judge panel held that Roommates.com was not able to claim Section 230(c) immunity because it acted as an information content provider by requiring users to choose from potentially discriminatory options.

However, while Chief Judge Alex Kozinski wrote the opinion, Judge Stephen Reinhardt wrote a separate opinion concurring in part, and dissenting in part, and Judge Sandra Segal Ikuta wrote a concurrence in part. Some commentators believed that the original Ninth Circuit opinion included unnecessary dicta that potentially limited 230(c) immunity in a way that the court did not mean to do. Due to the fractured nature of the Ninth Circuit opinion, and potential confusion over its scope, the court decided to rehear the case en banc.

== Ninth Circuit en banc decision ==
=== Majority ===
The court affirmed the three judge panel's decision, but Judge Kozinski used the opinion as an opportunity to clarify his previous opinion.

The court reasoned that Roommates.com was not immune under 230(c) for the questions it asked in its dropdown menus, because the website qualified as an information content provider. By requiring users to answer questions relating to gender and sexual orientation, Roommates.com provided content. Just because the users of Roommates.com are information content providers does not mean that Roommates.com is not also an information service provider. The court explained:

“Roommate created the questions and choice of answers, and designed its website registration process around them. Therefore, Roommate is undoubtedly the ‘information content provider’ as to the questions and can claim no immunity for posting them on its website, or for forcing subscribers to answer them as a condition of using its services.”

The court went on to say:

“By requiring subscribers to provide the information as a condition of accessing its service, and by providing a limited set of pre-populated answers, Roommate becomes much more than a passive transmitter of information provided by others; it becomes the developer, at least in part, of the information. And section 230 provides immunity only if the interactive computer series does not ‘creat[e] or develop[]’ the information ‘in whole or in part.’”

The Ninth Circuit found that Roommates.com was distinguishable from Stratton Oakmont, the case that motivated Congress to pass Section 230(c). In Stratton, the court found Prodigy liable for removing some bad content but not all bad content. In Roommates.com, the court found that the website affirmatively solicited discriminatory content.

The court also mentioned that its opinion was consistent with the previous Ninth Circuit case, Batzel v. Smith. In that case, the court held that an interactive service provider is immune under 230(c) if the changes the editor makes to a third party post are minor spelling or grammar changes.

The court clarified its holding in Carafano v. Metrosplash.com, noting that its language in that case had been overly broad. In Carafano, the court held that the website was immune under 230(c) for a fake dating profile posted by a third party, but also noted that the website would never be liable for a profile created by a third party. The court clarified this previous statement in Roommates.com by stating, “even if the data are supplied by third parties, a website operator may still contribute to the content’s illegality and thus be liable as a developer.” In Carafano, the dating website did nothing to elicit discriminatory or defamatory information. In contrast, the court in Roommates.com found that the website did elicit discriminatory information through its questions.

The majority analogized Roommates.com's use of questions to the physical world to determine whether CDA 230(c) immunity applied.

“[A] real estate broker may not inquire as to the race of a prospective buyer, and an employer may not inquire as to the religion of a prospective employee. If such questions are unlawful when posed face-to-face or by telephone, they don’t magically become lawful when asked electronically online. The Communications Decency Act was not meant to create a lawless no-man’s-land on the Internet.”

However, the court distinguished Roommates.com's actions from those of search engines: “By contrast, ordinary search engines do not use unlawful criteria to limit the scope of searches conducted on them, nor are they designed to achieve illegal ends—as Roommate’s search function is alleged to do here. Therefore, such search engines play no part in the ‘development’ of any unlawful searches.”

=== Partial concurrence and dissent ===
In her partial concurrence and dissent, Judge Margaret McKeown stated that “[t]he majority's unprecedented expansion of liability for Internet service providers threatens to chill the robust development of the Internet that Congress envisioned.”

She went on to say:

“[T]he majority's analysis is flawed for three reasons: (1) the opinion conflates the questions of liability under the FHA and immunity under the CDA; (2) the majority rewrites the statute with its definition of "information content provider," labels the search function "information development," and strips interactive service providers of immunity; and (3) the majority's approach undermines the purpose of § 230(c)(1) and has far-reaching practical consequences in the Internet world.”

She believed that by denying Roommates.com Section 230(c) immunity, Internet service providers would be unable to determine whether or not they will be held liable for third party content.

== Subsequent history ==
While Barnes v. Yahoo!, Inc. potentially further limited 230(c) immunity, most other cases since Roommates.com have left the section intact. In Barnes, the Ninth Circuit held that Section 230 may preempt state negligent undertaking claims. However, 230(c) may not preempt a promissory estoppel claim. If a service provider promises to remove content posted by third party and fails to do so, the service provider could potentially lose 230(c) immunity.

On the other hand, other cases have upheld Section 230(c) immunity for interactive service providers that were not also information content providers. For example, in Nemet Chevrolet v. ConsumerAffairs.com, the Fourth Circuit dismissed the case under 12(b)(6) for failure to state a claim, finding that the defendant was immune under 230(c)(1).

Similarly, in Dart v. Craigslist, Inc., the Northern District of Illinois held that Craigslist was immune under 230(c)(1) for illicit advertisements that third parties placed on the website.

In November 2008, the district court ruled that Roommates.com violated the Fair Housing Act. In February 2012, the Ninth Circuit reversed that ruling, holding that Roommates.com did not violate the law and dismissing the case.
