= Barnes v. Yahoo!, Inc. =

Court case involving internet service providers and user content

- Court: United States Court of Appeals for the Ninth Circuit
- Decided: June 22, 2009
- Citation: 570 F.3d 1096

Holding
- The Ninth Circuit dismissed Barnes' complaints, holding that Yahoo!, Inc. was immune from liability pursuant to Section 230 of the Communications Decency Act. This decision ultimately reversed the decision from the lower court in Oregon by granting Yahoo! the motion to dismiss.

Court membership
- Judges sitting: Diarmuid F. O'Scannlain, Susan P. Graber, Consuelo M. Callahan

Case opinions
- Majority: O'Scannlain, joined by a unanimous court

Laws applied
- Section 230 of the Communications Decency Act

Barnes v. Yahoo!, Inc., 570 F.3d 1096 (9th Cir. 2009), is a United States Court of Appeals for the Ninth Circuit case in which the Ninth Circuit held that Section 230 of the Communications Decency Act (CDA) rules that Yahoo!, Inc., as an Internet service provider cannot be held responsible for failure to remove objectionable content posted to their website by a third party. Plaintiff Cecilia Barnes made claims arising out of Defendant Yahoo!, Inc.'s alleged failure to honor promises to remove offensive content about the plaintiff posted by a third party. The content consisted of a personal profile with nude photos of the Plaintiff and her contact information. The United States District Court for the District of Oregon had dismissed Barnes' complaint.

== History ==
In 2004, Cecilia Barnes ended a relationship with her boyfriend. Following the breakup, her now ex-boyfriend tried to harass her by creating multiple unauthorized Yahoo! profiles about her that included solicitation to engage in sexual intercourse. These profiles seemed like they came from Barnes herself and contained nude photographs of her that were taken without her knowledge as well as her real contact information. The ex-boyfriend also pretended to be Barnes in several Yahoo! chat rooms, in which he directed men to the profiles that he created of Barnes. As a result of her ex-boyfriend's actions, Barnes started getting phone calls, emails, and even office visits from various men who expected to have sex with her.

Following Yahoo!'s policy, Barnes emailed Yahoo! to have the fake profiles removed. She sent them a copy of her photo ID and a signed statement explaining that she did not create those profiles and requesting their removal. However, she received no response and unknown men still continued to contact her. Barnes then made another request to Yahoo! by mail to take down the profiles. Receiving no response from either of her initial requests she sent two more requests, but still received no response. Eventually, just before a local news program was going to air a report on her story, Yahoo! finally responded. Barnes received a call from the Director of Communications, who instructed her to fax over the same information she had previously sent and told Barnes that she would "personally walk the statements over to the division responsible for stopping unauthorized profiles and they would take care of it." Barnes claims that she trusted the director, so she stopped worrying about the issue.

Two months after that, the profiles still remained online and Barnes had not heard anything back from Yahoo! ever since the Director of Communications told her that the issue would be resolved. In response, Barnes decided to file a lawsuit against Yahoo! in the district court in Oregon. It was not until she sued Yahoo! that the profiles were removed from the website.

== Trial ==
Yahoo!, Inc. relied exclusively on the first part of Section 230 of the Communications Decency Act, which bars courts from treating certain internet service providers as publishers or speakers. Yahoo!, Inc. asserted that it was immune from the suit under Section 230 of the Communications Decency Act, which "immunizes interactive service providers such as Yahoo! from liability for harm caused by the dissemination of third-party information."

Section 230(c) of the CDA: Protection for "good samaritan" blocking and screening of offensive material (1) Treatment of publisher or speaker — No provider or user of an interactive computer service shall be treated as the publisher or speaker of any information provided by another information content provider.

Barnes tried to make a claim that she was not holding Yahoo! liable as a publisher for the third-party content posted by her ex-boyfriend. She argued that her claim did not fall under Section 230, but rather, fell under Section 323 of an Oregon torts claim.

Section 323 of Oregon Torts Claim One who undertakes, gratuitously or for consideration, to render services to another which he should recognize as necessary for the protection of the other's person or things, is subject to liability to the other for physical harm resulting from his failure to exercise reasonable care to perform his undertaking...

Plaintiff alleged that when Yahoo! contacted her, she relied on its affirmative duty to remove the profiles and prohibited them from being posted again like the defendant promised. However, since Yahoo! failed to do this, Barnes alleged that the defendant did not "exercise reasonable care to perform his undertaking" and that she was harmed by the third-party content. She also claimed that Yahoo! violated an Oregon tort law that derives from section 323 of the Restatement of Torts, Second to remove the profiles on their website.

== Outcome ==
Plaintiff's claims fell under Section 230 of the CDA which grants broad immunity from liability to Internet service providers, which Yahoo! is. Barnes alleged that she was harmed by the material posted about her and said that Yahoo! violated an Oregon tort law to take down the profiles upon her request. According to the Court, "Any such claim by plaintiff necessarily treats the service provider as 'publisher' of the content is therefore barred by Sec. 230."

The court also stated that Barnes' argument that Yahoo! did not keep its promise of removing the defamatory content online did not dismiss the immunity provided to internet service providers by Section 230 of the CDA.

The United States Court of Appeals for the Ninth Circuit upheld the ruling that an Internet service provider is immune from removing indecent content from their website on the basis of Section 230 of the Communications Decency Act. The Ninth Circuit ultimately reversed the decision from the lower court in Oregon by granting Yahoo! the motion to dismiss.

== Similar cases ==
In 2012, a female model of the Model Mayhem networking website (pseudonymously referred to as Jane Doe) was tricked into a fake audition and raped. She brought a claim against Internet Brands, the owner of the Model Mayhem, for hosting the fake audition's text. Jane Doe alleged that Internet Brands had knowledge of illicit nature of the content it had hosted, neglecting the duty to warn. In 2014, the Ninth Circuit Court of Appeals held that Section 230 does not eliminate the duty to warn, dismissing Barnes v. Yahoo!, Inc. as a precedent to the contrary. Jane Doe ultimately failed to prove that Model Mayhem indeed had knowledge, and the case was dismissed without further references to Section 230.
