= Communications Decency Act =

1996 federal law attempting to regulate Internet pornography

The Communications Decency Act of 1996 (CDA) was the United States Congress's first legislative attempt to regulate obscene and indecent material on the Internet. In the 1997 landmark case Reno v. ACLU, the United States Supreme Court unanimously overturned most of the statute due to its restrictions on freedom of speech under the First Amendment to the U.S. Constitution. One non-speech provision of the statute, which exempted the operators of Internet services from liability for their users' actions, survived the Supreme Court's action and was severed from the statute. That provision is now known as Section 230 and remains in effect.

The CDA is the short name of Title V of the Telecommunications Act of 1996, as specified in Section 501 of that statute. Senators James Exon and Slade Gorton introduced an initial bill to the Senate Committee of Commerce, Science, and Transportation in 1995. The bill that became the CDA was added to the Telecommunications Act by the Senate by majority vote on June 15, 1995, and was passed by the House of Representatives on February 1, 1996.

== Legal history ==
Senators Exon and Gorton introduced their bill in the belief that Internet availability of pornography and other types of material unsuitable for children was on the rise. Indecency, or material suitable for consenting adults but not for children, had already been regulated for television and radio by the Federal Communications Commission and violators could lose their broadcasting licenses. Obscenity was even more heavily regulated and was not permitted in mass media. But there was no legal precedent or justification for subjecting the Internet to those older regulations.

The CDA marked the first statutory attempt to expand such content regulations to the Internet. Signed into law by President Bill Clinton on February 8, 1996, the CDA imposed criminal sanctions on anyone who:

knowingly (A) uses an interactive computer service to send to a specific person or persons under 18 years of age, or (B) uses any interactive computer service to display in a manner available to a person under 18 years of age, any comment, request, suggestion, proposal, image, or other communication that, in context, depicts or describes, in terms patently offensive as measured by contemporary community standards, sexual or excretory activities or organs.

On June 12, 1996, the Third Circuit Court of Appeals blocked part of the CDA, saying it would infringe upon adults' free speech rights. The next month, the federal court for the Southern District of New York struck down the portion of the CDA intended to protect children from indecent speech as overbroad. On June 26, 1997, the Supreme Court upheld the Third Circuit ruling in Reno v. American Civil Liberties Union, stating that the statute's content restrictions were an unconstitutional abridgement of the First Amendment because they did not permit parents to decide for themselves what material was acceptable for their children, they extended to speech and content that was acceptable for consenting adults, and they did not clearly define terms like "indecent" and "offensive".

Congress later made two narrower attempts to regulate children's exposure to indecency and obscenity on the Internet. The Child Online Protection Act of 1998, which had similar goals but used language related to protecting children rather than banning certain types of content, was also overturned by the Supreme Court for violating the First Amendment. The Children's Internet Protection Act of 2000, which tied content controls to the taxpayer funding received by schools and libraries, was also challenged in court but was upheld by the Supreme Court.
