= Ping.fm =

Social networking web service

- Website type: Social network service and Micro-blogging
- Available in: English
- Dissolved: 5 July 2012
- Successor: Seesmic
- Creators: Sean McCullough, Adam Duffy, Ryan Merket
- Revenue: Private Funding
- Website: ping.fm.com (offline)
- Commercial: Yes
- Registration: Required
- Launched: 7 March 2008
- Current status: Closed

Ping.fm was an advertising-supported social networking and micro-blogging web service that enabled users to post to multiple social networks simultaneously.

Making an update on Ping.fm pushed the update to a number of different social websites at once. This allowed individuals using multiple social networks to update their status only once, without having to update it in all their social media individually. Ping.fm grouped services into three categories – status updates, blogs, and micro-blogs – and updates could be sent to each group separately. Ping.fm was shut down on 5 July 2012 in favor of Seesmic, which was later replaced with Hootsuite.

== History ==
Ping.fm was created with the intent of making it as easy as possible to post updates to multiple social networking sites simultaneously for free. This service has been discontinued.

=== Open beta ===
After six months of being in closed beta, an announcement was made on 2 September 2008 that would no longer require private invite beta codes to be used to register and use the service. The launch into Open Beta was covered by outlets like Wired, and Mashable.

== Comparisons with similar websites ==
Ping.fm has been compared favorably to other websites with similar functionality like HelloTxt, which shut down in August 2012.

== Technology ==
Ping.fm was powered by LAMP (Linux, Apache, MySQL, PHP) with some .NET used in the core software. An API allows programmers to apply for an application key in order to develop third-party applications. Users must apply for an API key through their user profile.

== Supported services ==
A user can configure his or her Ping.fm account to aggregate content to the following services:

- Bebo
- Blogger
- Brightkite
- Google Buzz (Note: Discontinued by Google on December 15, 2011.)
- custom URL
- Delicious
- Facebook
- FriendFeed
- Friendster
- hi5
- Identi.ca
- Jaiku (Note: Now owned by Google.)
- Kwippy
- Koornk
- StatusNet
- LinkedIn
- LiveJournal
- Mashable
- MySpace
- Plaxo
- Plurk
- Pownce
- Rejaw
- Tumblr
- Twitter
- WordPress.com
- Xanga
- Yahoo 360
- Multiply
- YouAre

== Acquisition by Seesmic ==
On 4 January 2010, Seesmic announced that it would be replacing Ping.fm. In May 2012, Seesmic announced in its blog that Ping.fm would shut down in June 2012.

In September 2012, Seesmic was replaced by Hootsuite.
