= Micropub (protocol) =

Client–server protocol based on HTTP to create, update, and delete posts

- Abbreviation: MP
- Status: W3C Recommendation
- First published: May 23, 2017
- Organization: World Wide Web Consortium
- Editors: Aaron Parecki
- Base standards: HTTP, URI
- Related standards: microformats, ActivityPub, h-entry
- Domain: Social Web, Communications protocol
- Website: www.w3.org/TR/micropub/

Micropub (MP) is a W3C Recommendation that describes a client–server protocol based on HTTP to create, update, and delete posts (e.g. social media) on servers using web or native app clients. Micropub was originally developed in the IndieWebCamp community, contributed to W3C, and published as a W3C working draft on January 28, 2016.

Micropub uses OAuth 2.0 Bearer Tokens for authentication and accepts traditional form posts as well as JSON posts. Posted data uses a vocabulary derived from Microformats. Micropub is mostly used to create "posts", which are similar to Tweets, or micro blog posts, like those posted to Twitter. The protocol supports a variety of different content types however, such as Bookmarks, Favorites, Reposts, Events, RSVPs, and Checkins. Micropub is currently supported on a variety of IndieWeb compatible websites, like micro.blog.

== Implementations ==
There are numerous Micropub implementations, both clients, and servers, many of them open source.

=== Clients ===
- Quill
- OwnYourGram
- InkStone
- Micropublish
- Dobrado
- iA Writer

=== Services ===
- micro.blog

== See also ==
- OAuth
- MetaWeblog
