= Le Meur =

Le Meur, or Meur, is a Breton surname (ar Meur in Breton, meaning "the Great"), and may refer to:

- Annaïg Le Meur, (born 1973), French politician
- Daniel Le Meur, (born 1939), French politician
- Géraldine Le Meur (born 1972), French innovator and business executive
- Loïc Le Meur (born 1972), French entrepreneur and blogger.
