= FriendFeed =

Real time RSS and social news aggregator

- Website type: Social aggregator
- Available in: Chinese (Simplified), English, French, German, Italian, Japanese, Persian, Russian, Spanish, Turkish
- Dissolved: April 9, 2015; 11 years ago
- Owner: Meta Platforms
- Launched: October 2, 2007; 19 years ago
- Current status: Offline

FriendFeed was a real-time feed aggregator that consolidated updates from social media and social networking websites, social bookmarking websites, blogs and microblogging updates, as well as any type of RSS/Atom feed. It was created in 2007 by Bret Taylor, Jim Norris, Paul Buchheit and Sanjeev Singh. It was possible to use this stream of information to create customized feeds to share, as well as originate new posts-discussions, (and comment) with friends. Friendfeed was built on top of Tornado. The service was shut down at about 21:00 GMT on April 10, 2015, though the service blog announced it a month before.

The goal of FriendFeed according to their website was to make content on the Web more relevant and useful by using existing social networks as a tool for discovering interesting information. Users could be an individual, business or organization. Bloggers writing about FriendFeed said that this service addresses the shortcomings of social media services which exclusively facilitate tracking of their own members' social media activities on that particular social media service, whereas FriendFeed provided the facility to track these activities (such as posting on blogs, Twitter, and Flickr) across a broad range of different social networks. Some bloggers had concerns about readers commenting on their posts on FriendFeed instead of on their blogs, resulting in fewer page views for the blogger.

The founders were all former Google employees who were involved in the launch of services such as Gmail and Google Maps. They included Bret Taylor, Jim Norris, Sanjeev Singh and Paul Buchheit. Along with the latter two founders, venture capital agency Benchmark Capital was involved with the investment funding.

FriendFeed was based in Mountain View, California, and had on average one million monthly visitors. Employees of FriendFeed created the Simple Update Protocol to reduce the load put on sites by aggregators such as theirs.

On August 10, 2009, Facebook agreed to acquire FriendFeed. FriendFeed was bought for $15 million in cash, and $32.5 million in Facebook stock. Facebook, along with a small but active community of users, kept the service going until its pre-announced closure on April 9, 2015.

== Supported services ==
A user could configure their FriendFeed account to aggregate content from the following services:

Blogging

- Ameba
- Baidu Space
- Blogger
- Tumblr
- LiveJournal
- Skyrock

Bookmarking

- Delicious
- Diigo
- Furl
- Hatena
- Ma.gnolia
- Mister Wong
- StumbleUpon
- Twine

Books

- Goodreads
- LibraryThing

News

- Digg
- Meneame
- Mixx
- Reddit

Photos

- Flickr
- Fotolog
- Photobucket
- Picasa
- SmugMug
- Zooomr

Status

- Brightkite
- Facebook
- Gmail/Google Talk
- identi.ca
- Plurk
- Twitter

Music

- iLike
- Last.fm
- Pandora

Video

- 12seconds
- Dailymotion
- Joost
- Seesmic
- Smotri
- Vimeo
- YouTube

Comments

- BackType
- Disqus
- IntenseDebate

Miscellaneous

- Custom RSS/Atom
- Amazon.com
- LinkedIn
- Netflix
- Netvibes
- Polyvore
- SlideShare
- tipjoy
- Upcoming
- Wakoopa
- Yelp
