= Simple Update Protocol =

Simple Update Protocol, or SUP, is a protocol developed by FriendFeed to simplify and speed up RSS and Atom feed updates. Updates from services that supported the protocol would appear on FriendFeed within seconds, until support was dropped. These sites include Disqus, Identi.ca, reddit.

== Functioning ==
SUP introduces SUP feeds, which are lists of RSS and Atom feeds that have updated recently. A feed consumer (like FriendFeed, or a feedreader) can regularly poll a small number of SUP feeds instead of polling each individual feed.

RSS and Atom feeds are identified in SUP feeds by an opaque, unique identifier derived from their URL. This allows a SUP feed to index private feeds without revealing their URL.

SUP feeds are intended to be managed by services that publish large amounts of RSS and Atom feeds, though FriendFeed also hosted a public SUP feed which anyone could post updates to. The mechanism for posting updates to a public SUP feed is not standardised.

== Past Support ==
- Brightkite supported SUP but was itself shutdown in April 2012.
- YouTube's API v2.0 supported SUP, but that version of the API was deprecated in 2014 and YouTube's SUP feed was eventually shut down. YouTube data API v3 supports PubSubHubbub instead.

== See also ==
- PubSubHubbub
