= Web badge =

Small image used on websites

The two 88 × 31 px Web badges at the bottom of all Wikipedia pages
Various web badges (80 × 15 px)

Web badges, buttons or stickers are small images on web pages, typically part of the footer. They can be used for promotion, stating compliance with web standards or to comply with an application's terms of service. They are sometimes referred to as 88x31 or 80x15, common image resolutions for web buttons.

These were first popularized as "Best viewed in..." buttons by Netscape and Microsoft during the browser wars of the late 1990s. They have seen a resurgence in the early 2020s through websites like Neocities. There are now large collections of buttons linking to personal websites that serve as modern takes on old web culture.
