= Martin May =

Martin May may refer to:

- Martin O. May, Medal of Honor recipient
- Martin May (actor) (born 1961), German actor
- Martin May, founder of the Brightkite networking site
- Leigh Martin May (born 1971), United States federal judge
