= Sudden Coffee =

Instant coffee manufacturer based in San Francisco

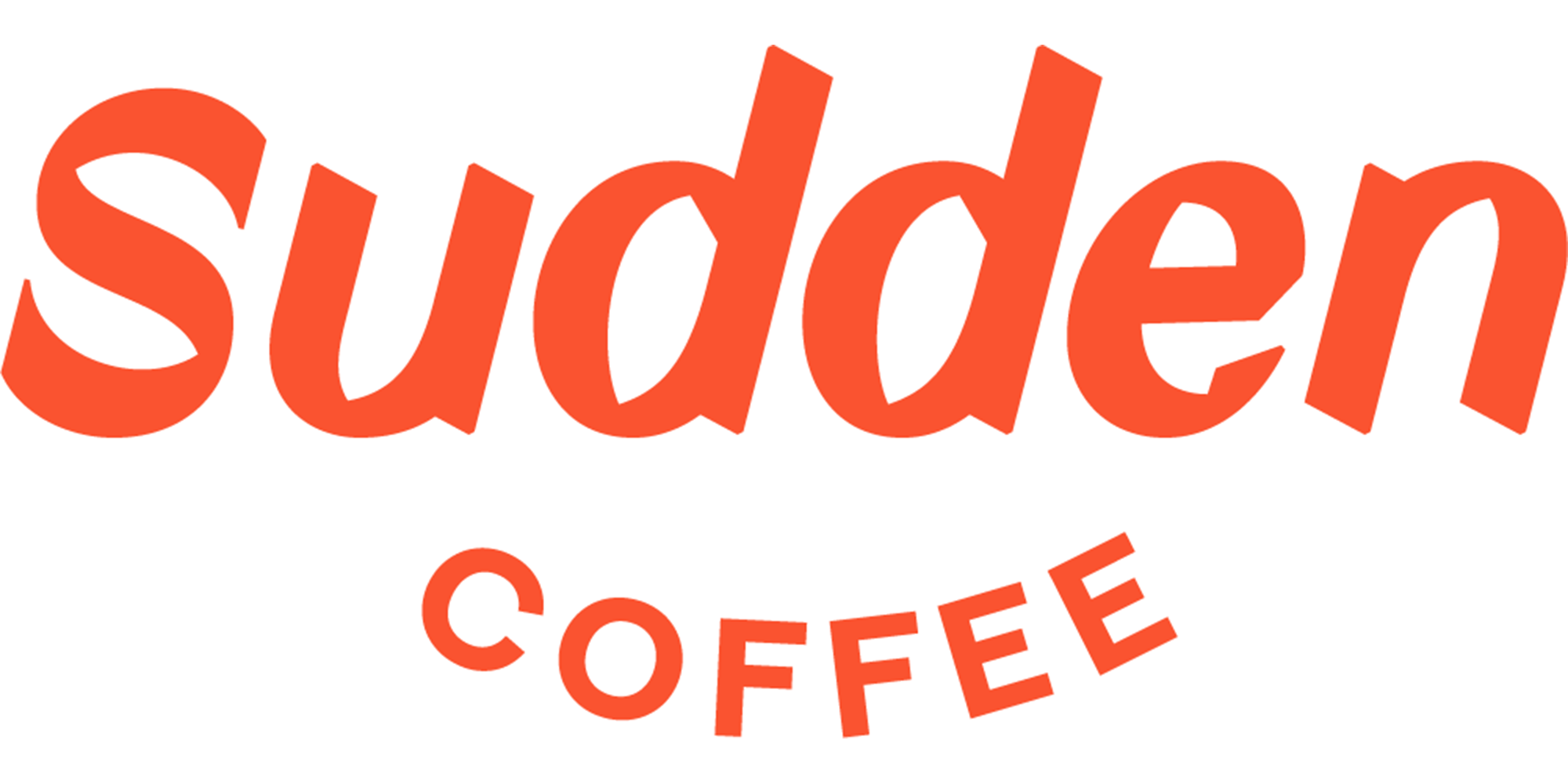
- Industry: Coffee, E-Commerce, Food and Beverage
- Founded: 2015
- Founder: Joshua Zloof and Kalle Freese
- Defunct: 2020
- Headquarters: San Francisco, The USA

Sudden Coffee were a specialty instant coffee manufacturer based in San Francisco, California, USA. It was founded by Joshua Zloof and Kalle Freese in 2015. The company closed in 2020.

== Background ==
Sudden Coffee was founded by Joshua Zloof and Kalle Freese. Freese & Zloof saw the demand to make properly brewed 'specialty coffee' easily available outside of major metropolitan areas. Sudden Coffee was founded with help from advisors Caterina Fake (co-founder of Flickr) and Jyri Engestrom (co-founder of Jaiku).

In the winter of 2017, Sudden Coffee became the second food company to be accepted by the Y Combinator accelerator.

Sudden Coffee originally started as a monthly subscription service.

== Manufacturing Process ==
Sudden Coffee used single-origin coffee beans, sourced from specialty roasters, including Equator Coffee & Intelligentsia Coffee. Next, the beans are fully brewed into liquid coffee. Sudden Coffee has developed a unique brewing process to brew at a lower temperature (85-90 C) than regular instant coffee, to prevent over-extraction, retaining natural sweetness, fruitiness, and acidity. The coffee is then freeze dried in small batches to give more control over quality. It is then packed by hand in recyclable containers for freshness.
