= Online presence management =

Promoting a person or business online

Online presence management is the process of creating and promoting traffic to a personal or professional brand online. This process combines web design, development, blogging, search engine optimization, pay-per-click marketing, reputation management, directory listings, social media, link sharing, and other avenues to create a long-term positive presence for a person, organization, or product in search engines and on the web in general.

Online presence management is distinct from web presence management in that the former is generally a marketing and messaging discipline while the latter is Governance, risk management, and compliance operational and security discipline.

== Theory ==
The theory of online presence management considers a website to be insufficient to promote most brands. To maintain a web presence and brand recognition, individuals and companies need to use a variety of digital platforms such as Google Maps, Facebook, Twitter, Instagram, Flickr, YouTube, and Pinterest, as well as cultivating a brand presence on mobile apps and other online databases.

The online presence management process starts by determining goals that will define an online strategy. Once this strategy is put in place, an ongoing and constant process of evaluating and fine-tuning is necessary to drive online presence towards the identified goals.

An online presence management strategy consists of several components. Generally, these will include search engine placement (making sure the brand appears high in search engine results when the end-user has a relevant query), monitoring online discussion around the brand, and analyzing the brand's overall web presence.

== Elements ==
An online profile or reputation is a product of multiple activities and platforms. It includes the following:

=== Web portfolio management ===
The online portfolio helps to build the visibility of a brand or individual. It works as a centralized hub for all the activities related to the brand and includes the contact info of the brand, what the brand is about (history, vision etc.) and a product showcase. The web portfolio comes in different forms. The most common form of a portfolio is the website. A website, usually built on the same domain as the brand's name, represents the business/person throughout the web.

=== Blog ===
A blog provides a brand with a way to express itself. It allows the brand to talk and get their voice/opinion heard on any topic they choose. Blogging can promote a brand through consistent, interesting content generation associated with a particular brand or the market said the brand caters to. Blogs can be created on the website or third-party platforms such as LinkedIn, Facebook, Instagram, Quora, WordPress, Blogger.com and Medium, etc. Apart from conventional blogging, social media has enabled Microblogging (through services such as Twitter and Tumblr) which is particularly effective in establishing a brand name and building the brand's recognition through interaction with the masses. It is also a quick way to respond to brand-related complaints and queries.

Corporate blogging is a powerful tool when attempting to communicate an idea important to the firm's identity. However, there are a few rules to keep in mind when utilizing corporate blogs:

1. Blogs can be both internal and external - This means that they can be effective to communicate new products or ideas to customers or make sure everyone inside the firm is on the same page.
2. Blogs are personal - Blogs are meant to be written from a first-person perspective.
3. Blogs need a good author to be successful, but it does not have to be the chief executive officer - Some believe that chief executive officers are too busy running the rest of the firm to also write a blog. Companies like Boeing and General Motors, for example, have successful blogs that are not written by their chief executive officers.
4. Blogs are targeted - Value the audience and write for them.
5. Blogs can be short-lived - Corporate blogs should not last long. They are created for a purpose, used, and then shut down. They are not meant to go on forever.
6. Blogs should not be used as feedback devices - Blogs are not meant to have personal dialect within them. They are not for conversation between employees.

=== Search engine optimization ===
Search Engine Optimization (SEO) is one of the most popular techniques to build traction and turn a web page into a revenue-generation machine. Search engine optimization allows companies or individuals to:

1. Identify keywords that are likely to bring potential customers or audiences to their website
2. Embed those keywords into the web content, naturally and in a value-added way
3. Allow search engines to crawl the web page and index all the content

Search engines use a spider or a crawler to gather listings by automatically "crawling" the web. The spider follows links to web pages, makes copies of the pages, and stores them in the search engine's index. Based on this data, the search engines then index the pages and rank the websites accordingly. Major search engines that index pages using spiders include Google, Yahoo, Bing, AOL, and Lycos.

Some methods that help optimize a web page for the search engine include:

- Link Building — creating relevant and natural links for the website
- Creating keyword-optimized content

=== Internet advertising ===
Internet advertising is a form of broadcasting and promotion of products, ideas, or services using the internet to attract customers. This idea is very similar to that of social media marketing. Internet advertising has overtaken other traditional advertising media such as newspapers, magazines, and radio. Internet advertising targets users interested in relevant keywords and displays a text or image ad next to search results or within social media. While searching to these specific keywords, firms can target their advertisements for specific audiences. The advertisements will more than likely pop up on social media, but can also show up just on websites that customers would visit. This increases the firm's online presence and makes their products or services more visible to potential consumers.

=== Reputation management ===
Reputation management is a critical part of online presence management. A company's reputation is based on consumer trust and is often dependent on information that is found on social networks and the internet. Having a good reputation has a significant impact on a company's survival. But having no reputation can be as critical as having a bad reputation. No reputation means you don't exist in the eyes of a consumer.

The first steps in developing and managing a company's reputation require the business to define their image, identify a target market and develop a core message. Next, the company should plan a detailed media strategy emphasizing issues management, message development and media preparation. Once these aspects are defined, the company can build effective communication strategies on how and where to get these messages across. These strategies should include how to address and involve the customer in all the firm's activities. This will impact reputation because engaged customers can contribute to the long term relationship of a firm by creating and disseminating information.

Management of a company's online reputation should include maintaining a social platform. Four main objectives for creating a positive reputation on a social web platform are building trust, promoting quality, facilitating member matching and sustaining loyalty. Ideally, this platform should emphasize a company's culture, industry news and valuable company information. Companies should consider what the consumer finds valuable when developing this platform. Finding the right combination of information and how to present it will require research into the target markets.

Managing a firm's reputation involves monitoring public opinion, current events, and online content. Websites and social media platforms influence how customers perceive a company, its products, and its services. While businesses cannot fully control public opinion, they can respond to feedback and address concerns. Digital media allows organizations to monitor customer opinions in near real time and adapt their communication strategies accordingly.

Reputation management is the process of tracking actions and opinions, looking for positive and negative reviews that reflect the opinion of the users about any particular service or product, removing negative opinions (if any) and converting them into positive ones. It is important, however, not to attack or try to obscure negative opinions through devious means, as this is likely to have an overall negative effect on the brand. A better strategy is to respond to complaints with information and an apologetic attitude, cultivating later positive reviews. Managers can take some control by planning ahead and developing strategies to communicate valuable information and address any negative reviews. Competence, cooperation and compassion should be the guiding principles when responding to media and other constituents in a crisis. Corporate managers must work together to understand and govern communications provided through social media. Several things managers can do to safeguard and enhance reputation with the use of social media include:

- Assessing the firm's reputation and monitoring their competitors' communications in the industry
- Considering the cost-benefit of expanding their presence
- Taking consideration and monitoring the impact of third party communication
- Engaging the customer

In today's business environment, consumers have unlimited accessible information about a company, product or service on social network sites. How a company is perceived or their reputation can make or break a business. For these reasons, businesses cannot afford not to monitor, communicate and maintain their online reputation.

=== Social media marketing ===
Social media marketing uses social media platforms to create and foster communities and relationships among people and businesses. Social media is one of the most prevalent forms of communication and marketing today and businesses reach massive amounts of potential customers through it. Social media marketing is focused on creating content that attracts attention and encourages readers to share content with their social networks. Social messages are often effective because they usually come from a trusted, third-party source, rather than the brand itself. However, a brand having their own specific voice through social media can also be very effective for keeping loyal customers close and attracting new ones.

Understanding what tools are available and how to use them effectively is key to success in social media marketing. Some of these tools include:

1. Social media content management
2. Social media publishing and scheduling
3. Social media monitoring
4. Social aggregation
5. Social bookmarking and tagging
6. Social analytics and reporting
7. Automation
8. Validation

It is also important to understand the different effects that social media marketing has on past, current, or future customers. Having a clean social media platform can increase brand loyalty among the customers who already purchase a specific product or brand. It can also affect a customer's future purchase intentions. Both of these effects have been studied and go hand in hand with one another. Although there is always more research to be done, specific studies have supported that when a business has a positive social media campaign, it influences the potential customers and their prospective purchases. All of these ideas tie back to a company having a strong sense of their online presence and managing it well.

=== Social media management ===
Many of the tools listed above are often found in a social media management system. This is a collection of procedures used to manage workflow in a disparate social media environment. These procedures can be manual or computer-based and enable the manager (or managing team) to listen, aggregate, publish, and manage multiple social media channels from one tool.

Social media management systems are used to promote businesses to prospective clients. A firm could hire one of many social media managers to oversee the operations of this for their team. Because the social network has changed how customers are reached and how they view products, it is incredibly important to manage a firm's social media responsibly. These social media managers can research effective ways on how to market the brand through social media platforms like Facebook, Twitter, LinkedIn, Instagram, and TikTok, along with other social media platforms. Companies pay on average $68,000 a year for someone to perform these services for them, however, that number is expected to rise. With the ongoing improvement and need for social media, it makes sense that this number would eventually surpass 6 figures. All in all, managing a firm's social media can boost their online presence by targeting their marketing to a specific group, improving on their existing marketing tactics, and keeping the brand name organized with their prospective goals in mind.

=== Web presence pyramid model ===
This kind of model is widely used by smaller businesses by following certain steps and stages. These models help for a business to better represent who they are and what they are trying to sell. A stage model, for example, may consist of stages such as promotional, provisional and processing. These stages are extremely important in the marketing and selling of any given product. The promotional stage is where networking and advertising are extremely prominent. These are essential to grow brand awareness and create sales. The provisional stage consists of adding features to the webpage for the product so that the consumers can have a better understanding of things such as price of a product. The processing stage is the financial part of the model. This is when the product is being sold to its customers and the actual order goes through with their payment. Data visualization is used in the Web Presence Pyramid Model because it gives a more simplistic look at the companies data received from their products sales rates and web pages views.

Using a step-by-step stage model is an effective way for small businesses to develop a strong online presence and showcase their products to potential customers. These models help businesses to create a clear representation of who they are and what they offer. The various stages of the model, such as promotional, provisional and processing, all play crucial roles in the marketing and selling of a product. Overall, the use of a step-by-step model can help small businesses create a strong online presence and effectively market their products to a wider audience.
