= Micro.blog =

Microblogging site

- Original author: Manton Reece
- Initial release: 24 April 2017
- Type: Social news
- License: Proprietary
- Website: micro.blog

Micro.blog is a microblogging and social networking service created by Manton Reece. It is the first large multi-user social media service to support the Webmention and Micropub standards published by the World Wide Web Consortium, and is part of the Fediverse, supporting ActivityPub.

== History ==
Micro.blog has features similar to Twitter or Instagram, and provides for posting status updates, articles, photos, short podcasts, and video. Micro.blog also supports long-form blogging.

It was launched on April 24, 2017, after a Kickstarter campaign that reached its funding target within one day. The service was built using Jekyll, but later transitioned to Hugo. Users can post using hosted accounts or import RSS feeds from other self-hosted blogs to syndicate them into the network from other websites they run. Users can also import their posts from Twitter, WordPress, Tumblr, and the defunct microblogging service App.net. Some of the Kickstarter Campaign rewards involved access to a book on Indie Microblogging that Reece committed to writing. A full draft of this now exists (as of 2022-12-22) and is publicly available.

The web hosting service DreamHost supported Micro.blog's Kickstarter campaign, and announced their intent to help customers create independent microblogs hosted at DreamHost that are compatible with Micro.blog.

== Philosophy ==
Micro.blog encourages users to publish under their own domain as part of its support for the IndieWeb "POSSE" principles—Publish (on your) Own Site, Syndicate Elsewhere. This publishing model involves the end user posting content to their own domain name based site first, then using web standards to syndicate to multiple other social networks and platforms.

Micro.blog supports syndication (referred as cross-posting on Micro.blog) to several locations: Day One, Flickr, LinkedIn, Mastodon, Medium, Nostr, PeerTube, Pixelfed, Threads, and Tumblr.

It also supports importing from data exported from WordPress, and supports cross-posting from Instagram to micro.blog.

Micro.blog eschews many of the common features of Twitter and other microblogging platforms. For example, Micro.blog does not show follower counts, does not have hashtags, public likes or trending topics, does not have equivalents of retweeting or quote tweeting, does not algorithmically recommend users and like Mastodon, and does not have full-text search as part of the service or client apps. Reece says in his book: "It mirrors a philosophy we have with Micro.blog to launch without follower counts or public likes."

Unusually, for a social network, Micro.blog's first full time employee was a Community Manager, Jean Macdonald, who—among other things—produces a hand-curated "Discover" section on Micro.blog.

Reece explains some of this in his book, saying: "I think more social networks should do things that don’t scale, prioritizing safety over profit. For example, in Micro.blog the featured posts in Discover are curated by humans instead of algorithms."

He also writes:

Micro.blog doesn't make it particularly easy to discover new users, and posts don't spread virally. While some might view this as a weakness, and it does mean we grow more slowly than other social networks, this is by design. No retweets, no trending hashtags, no unlimited global search, and no algorithmic recommended users.

Micro.blog limits search and avoids public likes and reposts so that the snowball starts small and stays small. Instead of going viral and becoming a major problem, fake accounts can be spotted early and shut down if necessary.

== Client applications ==
- Wavelength
- Sunlit 2.0
- Icro 1.0
- Gluon
- Micro Social

== See also ==
- IndieWeb
- Microblogging
- Indie Microblogging (by Manton Reece)
