= Metaweb (disambiguation) =

Metaweb was a web infrastructure company that was acquired by Google in 2010.

Metaweb may also refer to:

- The Metaweb, a site for book annotations and essays associated with Neal Stephenson's Baroque Cycle

== See also ==
- MetaWeblog, API an application programming interface
