= Rabi-Ribi =

2016 side-scrolling video game

- Official logo
- Developers: CreSpirit; GemaYue
- Publisher: CreSpirit
- Designer: GemaYue
- Programmer: GemaYue
- Artists: GemaYue; Saiste; Waero
- Composers: 3R2; MWT.Waiting; Triodust
- Platforms: Windows; PlayStation 4; PS Vita; Nintendo Switch
- Release: Windows; US: 28 January 2016; PlayStation 4; EU/AU: 1 September 2017; US: 31 October 2017; CN/KO/JP: 17 May 2018; PS Vita; EU/AU: 1 September 2017; US: 31 October 2017; Nintendo Switch; US/EU/AU/JP: 17 October 2019
- Genres: Metroidvania, bullet hell
- Mode: Single-player

Rabi-Ribi is a 2016 side-scrolling video game developed and published by CreSpirit. The game was initially crowdfunded, and despite only reaching half of its funding goal, it released for Windows in January 2016, and was ported to the PlayStation 4 and PS Vita in 2017. The game later received a port to Nintendo Switch in 2019.

The game combines the genres of bullet hell and metroidvania through pitting the player against various bosses with dense bullet patterns in a side-scrolling platformer environment. Players control Erina, a bunny girl, who has a very small hitbox to facilitate bullet hell gameplay.

Rabi-Ribi has been praised for the degree of customization it offers the player, in addition to a wide range of difficulty settings and modes to accommodate different skill levels. The game's soundtrack and originality have been met with approval, though it has drawn criticism for its weak storytelling and one-note character design.

== Gameplay ==
Rabi-Ribi is a 2D side-scrolling metroidvania game that takes place in Rabi Rabi Island, a fictional world where bunnies are worshiped. The player controls Erina, a pet rabbit who was turned into a human girl in a Playboy bunny outfit, while accompanied by the small fairy Ribbon who floats beside her, roaming Rabi Rabi Island exploring for items while engaging in combat. Enemies attack using large volumes of projectiles that fill the screen, like in other bullet hell games. To fight, players can either engage in melee combat with the Piko Hammer, or use one of Ribbon's various ranged projectile attacks from afar. Most of the game is spent exploring and collecting items to power up Erina and Ribbon while progressing the story by following set objectives. Exploration is mostly non-linear, and players can choose from multiple routes of exploration across the map, limited by movement options obtained by progressing the story.

Collectable items range from upgrades to Erina and Ribbon's weapons, such as "carrot bombs" and special melee skills for Erina, to consumable items to replenish health and mana. The game also features various badges, which can be equipped to change different aspects of gameplay, such as decreasing the size of Erina's hitbox. Throughout the story, the player will collect various movement upgrades to allow access to new areas, including a double jump and a sliding maneuver. A unique aspect of Rabi-Ribi is that certain playstyles allow for the complete avoidance of items altogether while still being able to complete the game; secret movement techniques are available for the player that enable the challenge of having no additional items.

Focus is placed especially on the multitude of boss battles, of which there are over 40. These bosses employ large projectile patterns that vary based on the chosen difficulty.

== Plot ==
Erina, a pet rabbit, wakes up in a cardboard box in a hospital building one day, having been transformed into a human girl. She is led by a voice to a room, which takes Erina to her home of Rabi Rabi Island. She tries to find her way back to Rabi Rabi Town in order to find out why she has become a human, meeting the fairy Ribbon along the way, who accompanies Erina through her adventure.

Along the way, she fights against the various denizens of Rabi Rabi Island to enlist their help in powering a magical portal at the center of Rabi Rabi Town, and is constantly ambushed by the rabbit-obsessed UPRPRC (Usagi Pero Pero Club), whose members wear fake bunny ears on their heads to attract real bunnies. Using the portal, Erina and Ribbon discover a world outside of Rabi Rabi Island, and eventually come face-to-face with the mastermind Noah, a mysterious guardian of the island. Noah reveals the island was once protected by a barrier which mysteriously broke and caused the bunnies to go extinct, and after repairing it she erased everyone's memories of the incident and went into self-imposed exile, but became lonely and desired to return by hijacking Erina's body, transforming her into a human with Noah's original physical appearance. Erina defeats Noah, who accepts her defeat and appoints Erina as the guardian of the island before vanishing.

During an investigation to understand the outside world, Noah briefly returns and warns Erina that Rabi Rabi Island cannot be discovered at any cost, as the residents of the outside world will destroy the island's peaceful nature. Some of the denizens are then revealed to be maintaining a barrier that shields the island from detection despite not remembering why. After much research, the barrier is altered to block teleportation into the island.

In the game's final chapter, Erina comes into one final conflict with her childhood friend Irisu, who is revealed to be the leader of UPRPRC, who always desired a pet rabbit of her own. A delusional and desperate Irisu attacks, forcing Erina to fight her back to her senses, and they pass out. Irisu is then revealed to be a bunny girl after the ears on her headdress are discovered to be unremovable.

In the Is the Order a DLC? DLC, Erina discovers traces of Noah and encounters an illusion of Noah's past self: Erina the Forgotten Maiden. To preserve her memories, Erina and the Forgotten Maiden battle, and the latter learns of what Noah had done in the present. The Forgotten Maiden seemingly disappears, but Erina is able to save her by storing the memories into her magical amulet. She is thankful, but requests Erina to keep her existence a secret from the other Rabi Rabi Island residents.

== Development ==
The game was developed by Taiwanese studio CreSpirit. It was given a limited physical release for PlayStation 4 and PS Vita through Limited Run Games in November 2018; a physical edition was previously available in Europe through publisher PQube. A 2024 announcement on the game's 8th anniversary of release confirmed paid DLC on Nintendo Switch and PS4 versions would be made available later that year, along with an all-inclusive "platinum edition", and that a direct sequel to the game would be developed.

== Reception ==
Rabi-Ribi has been favorably received overall, garnering an overall score of 80 on its PlayStation 4 release from Metacritic reviewers and 79 on its Nintendo Switch release.

Some attention has been drawn to the presence of the blogging service Plurk in the game. The platform is referenced in a crossover featuring a separate zone of the game known as Plurkwood.

The game's story has been reported as its weakest aspect, being described as "hit and miss", though Johnathan Kaharl, writing for Hardcore Gaming 101, considers the last of the postgame chapters "the one genuine human moment the game has in it" despite much of the rest of the plot being "too "anime"" and "bizarre".

== Sequel ==
A spiritual successor, Tevi, released for Windows and Nintendo Switch in November 2023, on PlayStation 4 and PlayStation 5 in May 2024, and Xbox Series X/S in June 2024.

On Rabi-Ribi's eighth anniversary, a direct sequel was announced to be in the works. Elements from a project codenamed Love Bunny would be incorporated into the sequel.
