= Feedalizr =

feedalizr
- Website type: Desktop Social Media Aggregator
- Available in: English
- Owner: Naspers
- Creator: MIH SWAT
- Website: feedalizr.com
- Commercial: Yes
- Launched: April 2008

feedalizr was a cross-platform, desktop social media aggregator built using Adobe Integrated Runtime that consolidates the updates from social media and social networking websites. Users can then use this application to update those sites from their desktop and view a consolidated stream of information.

Developed by a distributed team named MIH SWAT, located in Cape Town and São Paulo, it was the first Adobe AIR application for Friendfeed

As of 2009, feedalizr is no longer being maintained.

== Supported services ==
A user could configure his or her feedalizr account to aggregate content from the following services:

Social Media Aggregation

- FriendFeed

Photos

- Flickr
- Twitpic

Status

- Facebook
- Twitter
- Jaiku

Video
