= IA Writer =

Text editor

iA Writer
- Original author: Information Architects AG
- Developer: Information Architects AG
- Release: September 22, 2010; 16 years ago, for iOS
Stable release
- iOS: 7.2.15 / June 1, 2025; 17 months ago
- macOS: 7.2 / March 1, 2025; 20 months ago
- Windows: 2.0.9172 / February 10, 2025; 20 months ago
- Android: 2.0(86) / August 7, 2020; 6 years ago
- Written in: Objective-C (iOS, macOS), C (Windows), Java (Android)
- Operating system: macOS; iOS; Android; Microsoft Windows
- Size: 12–40 MB
- Type: Text editor
- License: Proprietary software
- Website: www.ia.net/writer

iA Writer is a text editor developed by Information Architects (iA). It was first released on September 22, 2010, for iOS, followed by a macOS version on May 28, 2011, and a Microsoft Windows version in 2018, funded via a Kickstarter campaign. An Android version was launched on August 7, 2020, but was later discontinued due to changes in Google API policies.

== Features ==
iA Writer is designed to focus solely on writing, offering a minimalist interface with features like distraction-free mode and syntax highlighting. It uses "writing typography," a concept emphasizing legibility with custom monospaced and duospaced fonts derived from IBM Plex Mono. Its signature blue cursor and gray background claim to enhance the user’s focus.

The editor supports Markdown for text formatting, enabling writers to seamlessly export to multiple formats such as PDF, Word, and HTML. Advanced integrations include Micropub publishing, allowing direct uploads to personal blogs or platforms like micro.blog.

In 2022, iA Writer added features including cross-document linking, YAML metadata, and shortcuts to improve navigation within the application.

In 2023, iA Writer introduced a feature in response to the growing use of AI-assisted writing tools. The "Authorship" feature does not generate text itself; instead, it allows users to mark and visually distinguish passages that were inserted from AI systems versus text written by the user, maintaining transparency and control over authorship.

== Reception ==
iA Writer has been praised for its simplicity and utility in fostering a distraction-free writing environment. In 2012, The Verge described the iPhone version as “one of the best tools for mobile writing.” It has also been recognized in reviews by MacWorld and Business Insider for its innovative design. The inventor of the Markdown language himself, John Gruber, referred to iA Writer as his “favorite iOS app for writing in Markdown.” In 2025, iA Writer was named a finalist for the Apple Design Awards in the Interaction category.

== See also ==
- List of text editors
- Comparison of text editors
