= Tirana Observer =

Newspaper in Albania

- Type: Daily Newspaper
- Format: Berliner
- Owner: Lefter Sota
- Editor-in-chief: Altin Sinani
- Language: English
- Headquarters: Irfan Tomini Street, Tirana, Albania
- Website: Tirana Observer

Tirana Observer is an Albanian language newspaper published in Tirana, Albania. Tirana Observer is a politically unaffiliated daily newspaper.

== Content ==
=== Sections ===
The newspaper is organised in three sections, including the magazine.

1. News: Includes International, National, Tirana, Politics, Business, Technology, Science, Health, Sports, Education.
2. Opinion: Includes Editorials, Op-Eds and Letters to the Editor.
3. Features: Includes Arts, Movies, Theatre, and Sport.

=== Web presence ===
Tirana Observer has had a web presence since 2007. Accessing articles requires no registration.

== Pricing ==
The paper's price is 30 Leke and could by bought by local shops. The newspaper is for subscribers available in Albania.
