= Dol2day =

dol2day
- Company type: Privately held company
- Website type: Social network, Virtual community
- Available in: German
- Headquarters: Berlin, Wesel Germany
- Owners: Karl-Heinz Hildebrandt, Markus Schaal
- Founders: Arash Yalpani, Torsten Marek, Andreas Hauser, Oliver Specht, Bartosz Plodowski
- Website: www.dol2day.com
- Registration: Required
- Launched: May 15, 2000 (26 years ago)
- Current status: Active

dol2day is a social networking platform for politically interested German speaking people. dol2day is the abbreviation for “democracy online today”. Most of the members are college and university students, pupils and younger professionals, in particular from Germany. Average age is between 20 and 30 years. Five students from Aachen launched the website in May 2000. Therefore, dol2day claims to be one of the oldest social networks and the biggest for politics in Germany. The site is a combination of Internet forum and multi-user dungeon (MUD).

dol2day provides several features for its members (“Doler”). Users are able to keep and maintain a personal page. This page contains information about their name, age, contact details, interests, friends list, political preferences and group as well as virtual party memberships within dol2day. Doler also have the option to upload a photo on their personal page. dol2day is comparable to other social networking sites.

Users can start public-opinion polls about political and social topics. In these polls all Doler are able to discuss the issue and to evaluate articles by other member.

Doler are accessed to vote an “Internet Chancellor” for a period of four months. In 2000 the election of the "Internet Chancellor" on the website received significant media attention in Germany. This “Internet Chancellor” organizes chats with politicians and other celebrities (e.g. Franz Müntefering, Christian Wulff, Günter Verheugen) and starts referendums to develop the community. But the ultimate decision makers are the owner of dol2day. From time to time Dolers hold local real-life meet-ups.

During the 2002 German federal election the Christian Democratic Union of Germany launched their own online community, which was criticised for supposedly plagiarising the concept of Dol2day.

== See also ==
- Me2day
