= Soup.io =

Microblogging site

- Company type: Privately held company
- Headquarters: Vienna (Austria)
- Founders: Christopher Clay, Lukas Fittl, Andreas Fuchs
- Industry: Microblog service
- Launched: April 2007
- Current status: Defunct as of 2020

Soup.io was an Austrian social networking and microblogging site.

== History ==
Soup.io allowed the user to publish (editable in HTML) text, images, videos, links, quotes and reviews. It allowed users to share files (within the limit of 10 MB) and create events. Its interface followed the Keep it Simple, Stupid principle (KISS). By March 2015, Soup.io had accumulated a monthly user base of almost 3.8 million.

In January 2017, Soup.io suffered data loss, and had to be restored over several weeks from a 2015 backup.

The site was discontinued on July 20, 2020 due to expenses and declining revenue. The domain was later bought by an unrelated content farm.

== Awards ==
- Soup.io received an investment during Seedcamp 2008.
- Soup.io was classified by the Guardian as one of the essential 100 websites of 2009.
- Soup.io was named "Innovative IT-Challenger" by APA – IT in September 2009.
