= Ryan Holmes =

Canadian computer programmer and internet entrepreneur

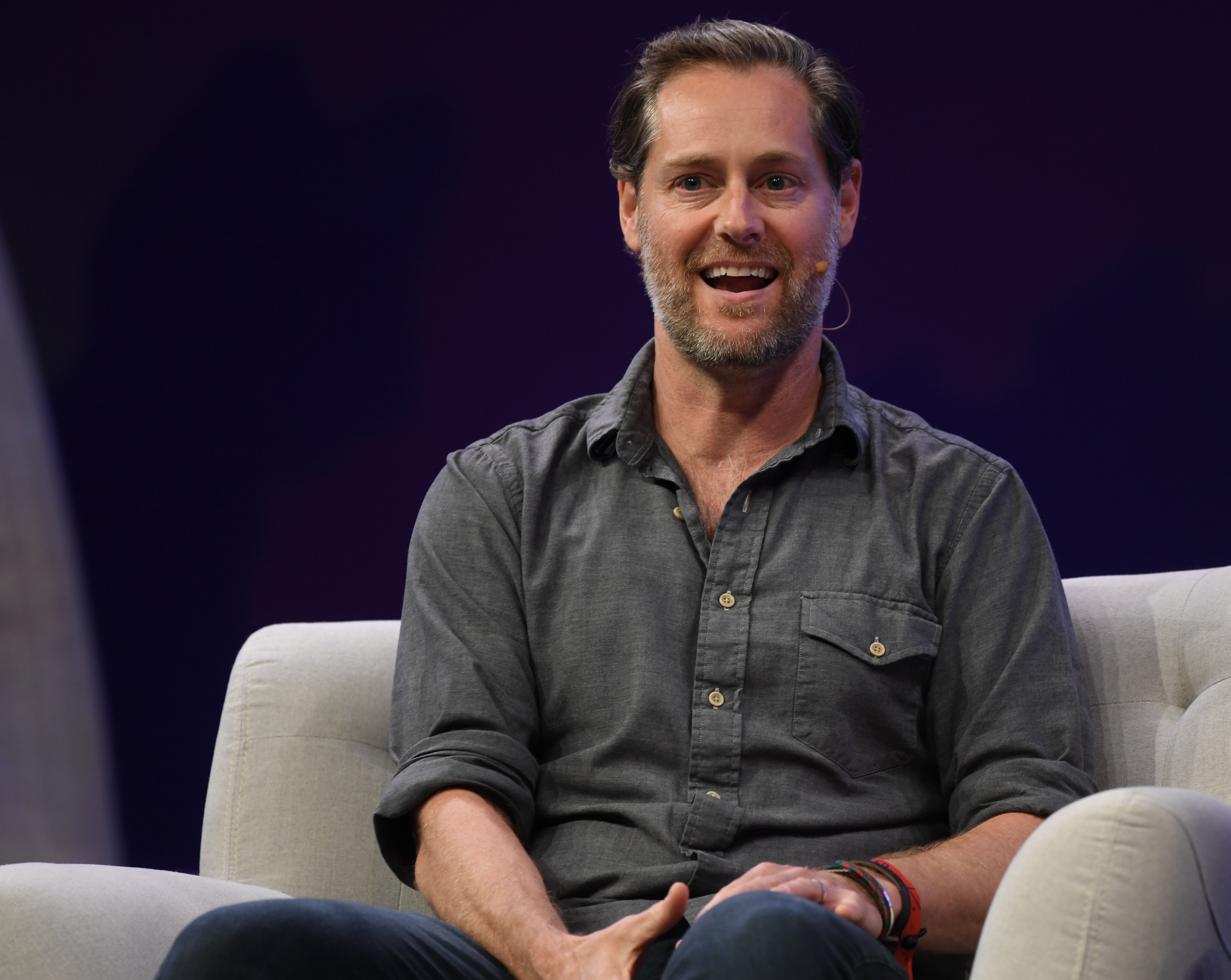
- Holmes at Collision in 2019
- Born: December 30, 1974 (age 51); Vernon, British Columbia
- Occupations: Computer programmer, entrepreneur
- Known for: CEO of Hootsuite
- Website: http://www.hootsuite.com

Ryan Holmes (born December 30, 1974) is a Canadian computer programmer and internet entrepreneur. He is best known as the founder and CEO of Hootsuite, a social media management tool for businesses with more than 18 million users and Holmes' fifth startup. Holmes began developing Hootsuite in 2008 through his agency, Invoke Media. He is also the founder of League of Innovators, a charity with a goal of building entrepreneurial acumen for youth, from discovery to acceleration.

Holmes is a contributor to the LinkedIn Influencers Program, where he writes about entrepreneurship and technology. Holmes also contributes regularly to news publications including Forbes, Fast Company and Inc.com.

== Early life and education ==
Holmes was born in Vernon, in the British Columbia Interior. Growing up, he lived on a small farm which was isolated and lacked electricity. Holmes won a district-wide programming contest in the fifth grade, and the prize was an Apple IIc which was rewired to run off of a car battery. He spent much of his spare time on the computer, both at school and at home.

In the mid 1990s, Holmes began taking business and computer science courses at Okanagan College but he eventually dropped out. In 2018, he received an honorary doctorate from the University of British Columbia for helping to shape the identity of Vancouver as a tech hub.

== Career ==
In high school, Holmes founded a paintball field as his first business which later became an online retailer. After dropping out of university in 1997 Holmes moved back to his hometown of Vernon and started his second business, a pizza restaurant called Growlies. He sold a franchise of the business in that year.

To re-pursue his passion for computers and be a part of the emerging tech industry, Holmes sold Growlies in 1999 and moved to Vancouver. While there he taught himself internet design and development and began working at a local technology firm.

Following this he founded Invoke, a digital media agency, where Hootsuite was born in 2008. Seven of the 21 employees at Invoke were tasked to work on building out the Hootsuite tool, at the time a freemium product that would enable businesses to incorporate social media into their marketing campaigns. In 2009, Holmes raised an initial round of Series A funding of $1.9 million for Hootsuite and spun it off as an independent company.

In 2012, he then raised another round of funding for Hootsuite in the amount of $20 million from Canada-based VC Omers Ventures. In August 2013, Holmes announced Hootsuite had secured $165 million in a Series B round of funding, the largest ever for a Canadian software company, led by Insight Venture Partners with participation from Accel Partners and existing investor OMERS Ventures. Today, Hootsuite has nearly 1,000 employees, and over 16 million users around the globe and has expanded its reach into the Enterprise-level market for large-scale social media solutions.

In 2013 Holmes launched an accelerator program for young entrepreneurs called The Next Big Thing (later rebranded as The League of Innovators), in part to help foster a "Maple Syrup Mafia," the term he coined in early 2013 to describe a new Canadian technology powerhouse similar to the original PayPal Mafia.

In 2016, he teamed with Steve Suchy to launch Oristand, an affordable cardboard standing desk/workstation.

In 2017, Holmes came out with a book, The 4 Billion Dollar Tweet, described by ZDNet as, "a guide to understanding and maximizing the use of social media." It is his first book. Holmes claimed that the book inspired Goldman Sachs Chief Executive Lloyd Blankfein to tweet for the first time in June 2017.

In 2020, Holmes started working on the startup idea platform Kern.al.

Holmes stepped down as Hootsuite's chief executive in July 2020 and remained chair of its board. He returned as interim CEO in April 2026.

== Recognition ==
- 2012: Okanagan College Alumni Association’s Distinguished Alumni Award
- 2013: Queen Elizabeth II Diamond Jubilee Medal

== Personal life ==
Holmes' personal interests include rock climbing, yoga, and paragliding.
