= Loïc Le Meur =

French entrepreneur and blogger (born 1972)

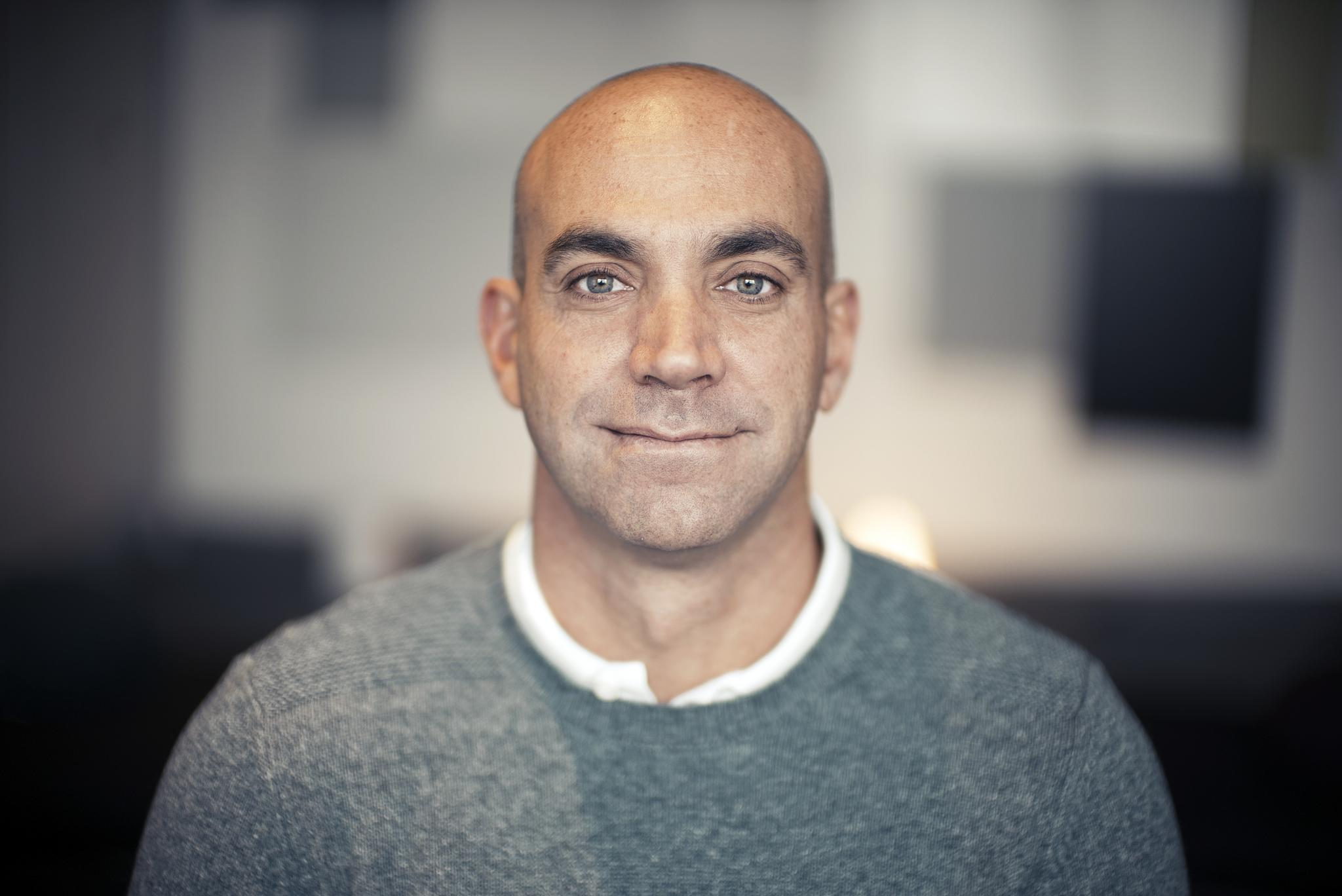
- Le Meur at the 2014 LeWeb Conference
- Born: 14 July 1972 (age 54); France
- Education: HEC Paris
- Occupations: Entrepreneur, blogger

Loïc Le Meur (born 14 July 1972) is a French entrepreneur and blogger. He was Executive Vice President EMEA at software company Six Apart after merging French blogging company Ublog with Six Apart in July 2004. In late 2006 Le Meur became a public backer of French presidential candidate Nicolas Sarkozy and joined Sarkozy's campaign team as an advisor on Internet-related topics.

== Career ==
In 1996, Loïc Le Meur founded his first company, interactive agency B2L, after graduating from HEC Paris.

He also founded RapidSite France with his wife a web hosting company for small businesses in France. In 1999, he sold RapidSite to France Télécom where it became part of Wanadoo.

In 2000, he founded application service provider Tekora.

In 2003, he got involved with French weblog hosting company Ublog which he purchased from its founder, fellow Breton Stéphane Le Solliec in October 2003. He then grew Ublog and merged the company with Six Apart where he became Executive Vice President in 2004. He held his role as EVP EMEA until March 2007 when he handed his job over to long-time business partner Olivier Creiche. Le Meur remains Honorary Chair of Six Apart Europe.

In 2015, he founded leade.rs, a platform for speakers. In 2019, leade.rs was acquired by Animoca. Le Meur joined Animoca as a venture partner to assist in growth and expansion opportunities.

== Blogging and LeWeb ==
In 2004 Le Meur became part of the team behind the official World Economic Forum blog.

Since 2004, Le Meur has organized a conference focused on blogging and the web world with Géraldine Le Meur, his wife until recently. In December 2006, he managed to get Shimon Peres, Nicolas Sarkozy, and French politician François Bayrou on stage at LeWeb '03. More than 2,600 people from 60 different countries attended in 2010. Approximately 3,200 attended in 2014.

== Seesmic ==
In 2007, Le Meur moved to San Francisco to launch a new startup named Seesmic.

Seesmic was initially focused on the creation of an online community of video bloggers. Following the 2008 economic crisis Seesmic's became a social media client company. In January 2010, Seesmic acquired Ping.fm and allowed its users to update simultaneously more than 50 different social media statuses. In February 2011, Seesmic received funding from Salesforce.com and Softbank, bringing total funding to $16 million. In September 2012, Seesmic was acquired by HootSuite.

== Bibliography ==
- Blogs pour les pros by Loïc Le Meur and Laurence Beauvais, Dunod ISBN 2-10-049395-7, November 2005
- La révolution podcast by Loïc Le Meur and Laurence Beauvais, Dunod ISBN 2-10-050059-7, September 2006.

== On social media ==
- On December 11, 2016, Le Meur shared his concern about Tesla Motors drivers using charging slots as parking space on Twitter. Elon Musk immediately took action and fixed the issue within 6 days.
