= ImaHima =

ImaHima was a mobile location-based social-networking service created in 1999 and shut down in 2006. This service was launched by the Japanese company of the same name, founded by Neeraj Jhanji. This Japanese name means "are you free now?" This company pioneered the concept of sharing current status (location, activity, mood) among friends using mobile phones. Initially ImaHima started out as an "unofficial" service but was later accepted inside the walled garden of the Japanese mobile carriers (NTT DoCoMo, KDDI, Softbank). At its peak, ImaHima had over 500,000 users in Japan and was also made available in Switzerland and Australia. The service won a few awards including the coveted Prix Ars Electronica in 2001. The fundamental patents for mobile checkin, status updates and location-based advertising pioneered by ImaHima were acquired by Facebook in 2013.

== See also ==
- Microblogging
