= Personal web page =

Web page created by an individual to contain personal content

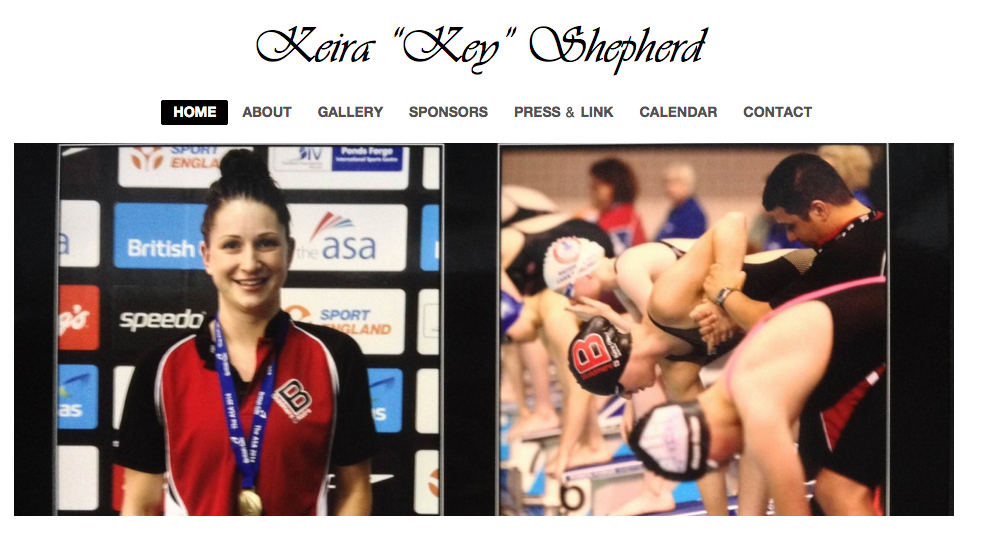
The personal web site of athlete Keira Shepherd. The navigation bar on the top of the page contains links to additional content, such as more digital photos, information about her sponsors, press clippings and news links, a calendar of her appearances at athletic competitions, and contact information.

Personal web pages are World Wide Web pages created by an individual to contain content of a personal nature rather than content pertaining to a company, organization or institution. Personal web pages are primarily used for informative or entertainment purposes but can also be used for personal career marketing (by containing a list of the individual's skills, experience and a CV), social networking with other people with shared interests, or as a space for personal expression.

These terms do not usually refer to just a single "page" or HTML file, but to a website—a collection of webpages and related files under a common URL or Web address. In strictly technical terms, a site's actual home page (index page) often only contains sparse content with some catchy introductory material and serves mostly as a pointer or table of contents to the more content-rich pages inside, such as résumés, family, hobbies, family genealogy, a web log/diary ("blog"), opinions, online journals and diaries or other writing, examples of written work, digital audio sound clips, digital video clips, digital photos, or information about a user's other interests. Many personal pages only include information of interest to friends and family of the author. However, some webpages set up by hobbyists or enthusiasts of certain subject areas can be valuable topical web directories.

== History ==
In the 1990s, most Internet service providers (ISPs) provided a free small personal, user-created webpage along with free Usenet News service. These were all considered part of full Internet service. Also several free web hosting services such as GeoCities provided free web space for personal web pages. These free web hosting services would typically include web-based site management and a few pre-configured scripts to easily integrate an input form or guestbook script into the user's site. Early personal web pages were often called "home pages" and were intended to be set as a default page in a web browser's preferences, usually by their owner. These pages would often contain links, to-do lists, and other information their author found useful. In the days when search engines were in their infancy, these pages (and the links they contained) could be an important resource in navigating the web. Since the early 2000s, the rise of blogging and the development of user friendly web page designing software made it easier for amateur users who did not have computer programming or website designer training to create personal web pages. Some website design websites provided free ready-made blogging scripts, where all the user had to do was input their content into a template. At the same time, a personal web presence became easier with the increased popularity of social networking services, some with blogging platforms such as LiveJournal and Blogger. These websites provided an attractive and easy-to-use content management system for regular users. Most of the early personal websites were Web 1.0 style, in which a static display of text and images or photos was displayed to individuals who came to the page. About the only interaction that was possible on these early websites was signing the virtual "guestbook".

With the collapse of the dot-com bubble in the late 1990s, the ISP industry consolidated, and the focus of web hosting services shifted away from the surviving ISP companies to independent Internet hosting services and to ones with other affiliations. For example, many university departments provided personal pages for professors and television broadcasters provided them for their on-air personalities. These free webpages served as a perquisite ("perk") for staff, while at the same time boosting the Web visibility of the parent organization. Web hosting companies either charge a monthly fee, or provide service that is "free" (advertising based) for personal web pages. These are priced or limited according to the total size of all files in bytes on the host's hard drive, or by bandwidth, (traffic), or by some combination of both. For those customers who continue to use their ISP for these services, national ISPs commonly continue to provide both disk space and help including ready-made drop-in scripts.

With the rise of Web 2.0-style websites, both professional websites and user-created, amateur websites tended to contain interactive features, such as "clickable" links to online newspaper articles or favourite websites, the option to comment on content displayed on the website, the option to "tag" images, videos or links on the site, the option of "clicking" on an image to enlarge it or find out more information, the option of user participation for website guests to evaluate or review the pages, or even the option to create new user-generated content for others to see. A key difference between Web 1.0 personal webpages and Web 2.0 personal pages was while the former tended to be created by hackers, computer programmers and computer hobbyists, the latter were created by a much wider variety of users, including individuals whose main interests lay in hobbies or topics outside of computers (e.g., indie music fans, political activists, and social entrepreneurs).

== Motivations ==
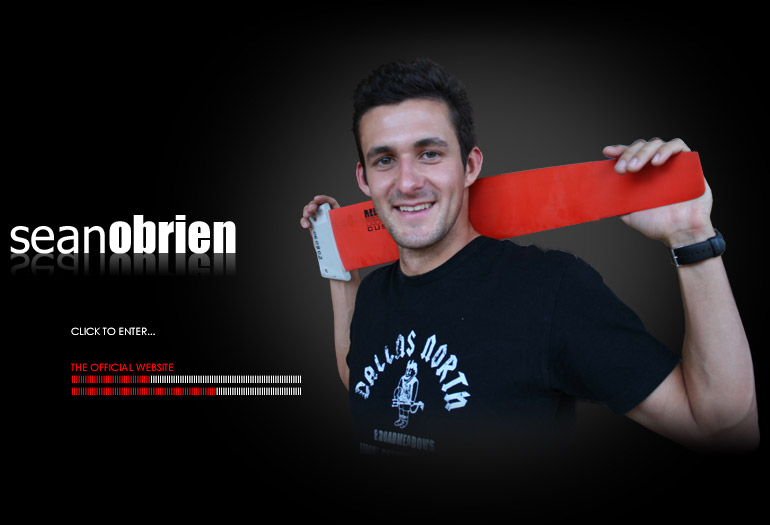
The personal webpage of surfer Sean O'Brien that opens with a splash screen

In a study done by Zinkhan, participants had four main reasons to create personal web pages. First, people use personal web pages as a portrayal of self, in a sense marketing themselves, since creators have the freedom to portray their own identities. Second, personal web pages are a way to interact with people who have similar interests as the creator, possible employers, or colleagues. Third, personal web pages can gain social acceptance with groups that the creator is interested in depending on the information that the creator reveals about themselves. Fourth, personal web pages can give creators a sense of connection to the world since these web pages are public and a way to introduce oneself to other people around the globe.

People may maintain personal web pages to serve as a showcase for their skills in professional life, creative skills or self promotion of their business, charity or band. The use of personal web pages to display an individual's professional life has become more common in the 21st century. Mary Madden, an expert researcher on privacy and technology, did a study that found a tenth of American jobs require Personal web pages that advertise an individual online. Personal web pages have become a source of initial impression of possible employees used by employers. It can also be used to express opinions on issues ranging from news and politics to movies. Others may use their personal web page as a communication method. For example, an aspiring artist might give out business cards with their personal web page, and invite people to visit their page and see their artwork, "like" their page or sign their guestbook.

A personal web page gives the owner generally more control on presence in search results and how they wish to be viewed online. It also allows more freedom in types and quantity of content than a social network profile offers, and can link various social media profiles with each other. Some personal web pages include structured data so that search engines can interpret the page as being about a particular person. It can be used to correct the record on something, or clear up potential confusion between you and someone with the same name.

In the 2010s, some amateur writers, bands and filmmakers release digital versions of their stories, songs and short films online, with the aim of gaining an audience and becoming more well-known. While the huge number of aspiring artists posting their work online makes it unlikely for individuals and groups to become popular via the Internet, there are a small number of YouTube stars who were unknown until their online performances garnered them a huge audience.

== Sites of academics ==
Academic professionals (especially at the college and university level), including professors and researchers, are often given online space for creating and storing personal web documents, including personal web pages, CVs and a list of their books, academic papers and conference presentations, on the websites of their employers. This goes back to the early decade of the World Wide Web and its original purpose of providing a quick and easy way for academics to share research papers and data.

Researchers may have a personal website to share more information about themselves, about their academic activities and for sharing (unpublished) results of their research. This has been noted as part of the success of open-access repositories such as arXiv.

== See also ==
- Blog
- Blog hosting service
- Electronic portfolio
- Home server
- IndieWeb
- Neocities
- Social networking service
- Web hosting service
