= Neocities =

Web-hosting site

- Penelope, the mascot of Neocities
- Website type: Web hosting
- Creator: Kyle Drake
- Website: neocities.org
- Commercial: Yes
- Registration: Yes
- Launched: June 28, 2013; 13 years ago
- Written in: Ruby

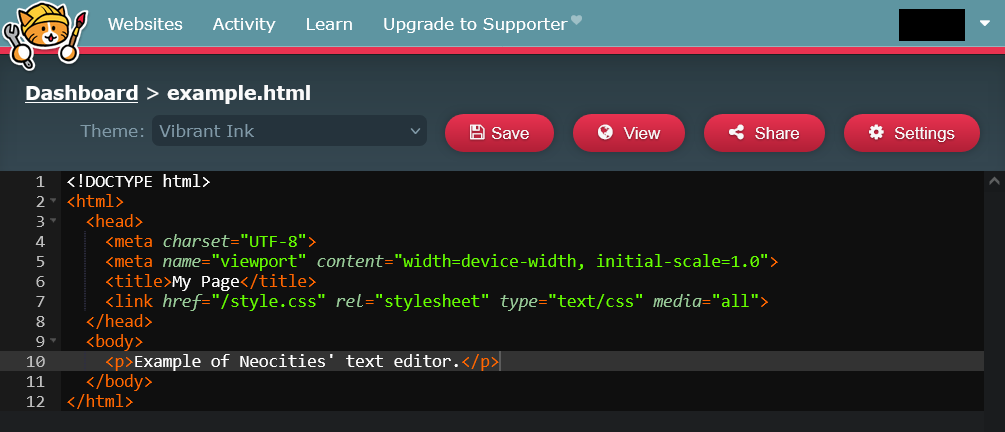
Neocities' Text Editor

Neocities is a commercial web hosting service for static pages. It offers 1 GB of storage space, 200 GB of bandwidth for free sites and no server-side scripting for both paid and free subscriptions. The service's expressed goal is to "revive the support of free web hosting of the now-defunct GeoCities". Neocities was launched in 2013 by Kyle Drake. As of May 25, 2026, it has hosted more than 1,763,200 sites. The service is powered by an open-source backend provided under the FreeBSD license.

== History ==
Neocities was created by Kyle Drake on May 23, 2013, and launched on June 28, 2013, offering 10 megabytes of file storage for every user. It initially served as an archive for sites previously hosted on GeoCities before the latter's shutdown.

On May 8, 2014, Neocities announced that it would limit the bandwidth speed of the FCC headquarters to early dial-up modem speeds as a protest against FCC's stance on net neutrality. This protest received wide attention and lasted until February 2, 2015.

The service hosted about 55,000 to 57,000 sites in 2015, which had risen to over 460,000 by 2022, and 615,700 by 2023. On February 10, 2025, Neocities reached over one million hosted sites.

As of May 2025, Neocities allows 1 GB of storage and 200 GB of bandwidth to free users, and 50 GB of storage and 3000 GB of bandwidth to "supporters". Neocities claims that if the bandwidth limit is reached, the website won't be taken down immediately. "This is a soft limit. Temporary surges are fine, we won't take your site down immediately, and we're very flexible."

== Usage ==
Neocities allows users to create their own websites using HTML, CSS, and JavaScript, and the development tool comes with a built-in debugger for these languages. The intention is for users to create personal websites reminiscent of GeoCities. Files can be modified by using Neocities' own web text editor, or uploaded directly either within the dashboard, using the Neocities command-line tool, WebDAV mounting, or their REST API.

Neocities has 2 options for users to store their data. A free plan, which has 1 GB of data storage and slower transfer speeds, and a paid plan, which allows 50 GB of storage and faster transfer speeds. The paid plan costs $5.00 per month, and funds go to server expenses.

The files that free users can host on Neocities are restricted to HTML files, CSS files, JavaScript files, Markdown files, XML files, text files, fonts and images (except for BMPs). By upgrading to their paid plan, this restriction is removed. This restriction is in place to prevent it from becoming a "file dump".

== Community ==
Similar to Geocities, Neocities has a small but active group of users. Using the search feature, individuals can view a plethora of websites hosted on Neocities and can look for specific sites using tags.

There is also a vibrant social aspect within Neocities where users will connect with each other by following each other or interacting with them in other ways. Popular methods of social networking within the community include things such as WebRings, links, and WebBadges dedicated to other people’s websites.

== See also ==
- IndieWeb
- Personal web page
