= Tevi =

2023 side-scrolling video game

- Cover art for Tevi
- Developers: CreSpirit; GemaYue
- Publisher: CreSpirit
- Platforms: Windows; PlayStation 4; PlayStation 5; Xbox One; Xbox Series X; Nintendo Switch
- Genres: Metroidvania, bullet hell
- Mode: Single-player

Tevi (stylized in all caps) is a 2023 side-scrolling video game developed and published by CreSpirit. The game was released November 29, 2023 for Windows and Nintendo Switch, and became available on Xbox and Playstation later in 2024. Tevi was announced in early 2023 alongside a demo version. The game's story follows Tevi, a girl with rabbit ears, and her quest to collect "Astral Gears", items that store mana and are an obsession of Tevi's father.

== Gameplay ==
A side-scrolling metroidvania game, Tevi has similar gameplay to Rabi-Ribi, CreSpirit's previous publication. Players control Tevi, a girl with rabbit ears, and collect various pieces of gear to upgrade her attack and defense capabilities. Most of the direct upgrades to Tevi herself increase her melee capabilities, while supporting items allow for magical ranged attacks and buffs. The reason Tevi has bunny ears has been noted as the "signature" of the author GemaYue.

Tevi is guided by the player through various environments and must make use of dodging and defensive skills to navigate, fight enemies, and defeat bosses in various areas, many of which follow a steampunk aesthetic.

== Plot ==
Tevi takes place in the continent of Az, home to three races: magic-wielding humans, animal-eared beastkin, and bio-mechanical hybrids called magitech. The humans are fully capable of utilizing mana, while beastkin are adept at machinery and mechanics but are naturally incapable of using magic. Magitech are mana-powered robots that have become increasingly advanced over time. A mysterious and malevolent force known as decay also exists to corrupt in its path.

Thirty years ago, a human mage named Charon attempted to harness the immense mana of Astral Gears to create Elysium, a reality-rewriting spell. Before he could do so, the primitive magitech, with the aid of decay, suddenly rebelled against the humans, igniting an incident known as the "Magitech Rebellion." The human monarchy completely collapsed, and both Charon and their leader Empress Dahlia had vanished. The beastkin spearheaded the reconstruction of Az, installing themselves in positions of power: the law-abiding Peacekeepers, the construction corporation Travoll Industries, and the thieving Golden Hands. The most advanced prime magitech did not partake in the rebellion, and fled the mainland to form their own societies: the angels of Valhalla and the demons of Tartarus.

In the present, Tevi journeys the world in search of Astral Gears for her father Zema's research. During an expedition, she recruits the angel Celia and the demon Sable, who occupy her orbitars. Their adventure takes them far and wide, with numerous encounters with Tevi's self-proclaimed rival Vena, traversing through the beastkin and human towns of Morose and Ana Thema, meeting with the various organizations including the demon leader Vassago and angel leader Amaryllis, foiling a revenge scheme born from racial tensions, learning of Az's history and the world slowly recovering from the aftermath of the Magitech Rebellion, learning Sable set off on his journey in search of a way to heal his terminally ill sister Sabrina, encountering darker sides of Valhalla and Tartarus that Celia opposes, and confronting Tevi's own past of being adopted from an orphanage that was destroyed by decay.

Tevi eventually learns of Empress Dahlia's capture in Tartarus. Vassago denies having done the deed, but decides to battle her anyway, during which Sable is fatally wounded. Dahlia teleports Tevi's group away and uses an Astral Gear to revive Sable, then warns them that Charon survived and is plotting to drop Valhalla over Az. Tevi alerts Amaryllis, but she immediately orders her to cease investigating and captures her. Tevi escapes and follows a lead to Snowveil. Turning out to be territory to the Golden Hands, Tevi discovers their leader Jethro is being controlled by Charon and frees him, who agrees to take her to Charon's suspected hideout in Dreamer's Keep.

Finally confronting Charon, he is suddenly assassinated by Queen Tahlia, Dahlia's twin sister whom was ignored from history due being unvalued by human society, and had disguised herself as Dahlia and feigned capture to manipulate Tevi. Having envied her sister's higher status, Tahlia steals Charon's Astral Gears and escapes. Illusory images reveal that Tahlia exploited Charon in order to seize Elysium, then instigated the Magitech Rebellion as a distraction but was ultimately foiled by Dahlia. Tevi comes across the real Dahlia, and Amaryllis is revealed to be working for Charon to hide her existence. They warn that Tahlia is now attempting to collect the remaining Astral Gears on Az, causing Tevi to realize Zema is in danger. She quickly returns home to find her father dying, who reveals that he was once Charon's research assistant but ultimately came to the conclusion that Astral Gears are the root cause of decay and was planning on destroying them.

Tevi is led by Voodoo, a mysterious cat that had been following her throughout her journey, to Tahlia's lair. Despite Tahlia using the Astral Gears to power up, Tevi defeats her. However, the Revenance, decay made sentience from clinging on to Tahlia, suddenly manifests. With Zema tinkering the Astral Gears into purifying agents against decay, Tevi overcomes Revenance. Sable, due to his life being prolonged by Tahlia, gives out due to her death. Tevi's group is rescued by Dahlia, which scatters them across Az; Voodoo secretly collects Sable's body.

In the aftermath, Celia has returned to Valhalla planning to install herself in a higher position, while Tevi declares that her journey has not yet ended.

=== Fauna Arcana ===
Sixth months later, Tevi and Celia follow a lead to Sable's whereabouts, confronting Vassago who had been in cahoots with Voodoo. Vassago reveals that Voodoo is a foreign traveler that collects ancient relics, but a mishap with one turned him into a small cat-rabbit hybrid and has been looking for a way to regain his original form, and has been stalking Sable because they share identical mana signatures, who have both left Az for Rabina Isle.

Tevi hitches a ride on a train and encounters Vena, who joins the party. The group runs into Sable, who is revealed to be alive and well thanks to Voodoo stabilizing him and Sabrina using the isle's abundance of mana in exchange for helping him regain his original form by breaching into the depths of the isle where the Seed Node lies. However, this power source is threatened by the Xeraphids, insect-like magitech that feed on mana and have grown increasingly hostile due to the eradication of decay. Tevi is able to persuade the rabbit beastkin of the isle to gain entry to the Sanctum.

The party eradicates the Xeraphids within the Sanctum, including the Hive Lord. However, the Hive Lord possesses Voodoo's staff, forcing the party to fight him to break free from control. With the threat removed, the Seed Node is free to gather mana from the world again and continue to revitalize them. Tevi, knowing that Celia and Sable are occupied with their own matters in the future, continues to adventure with Vena by her side.

== Reception ==
Reception

Aggregate scores
Aggregator	Score
Metacritic	(PC) 83/100 (Switch) 81/100
OpenCritic	93% recommended

According to review aggregator website Metacritic, Tevi received "generally favorable" reviews by critics on Windows and Nintendo Switch. The game was rated at over 90% on Steam one month after release.
