= Web presence =

A web presence is a location on the World Wide Web where a person, business, or some other entity is represented (see also web property and point of presence).

Examples of a web presence for a person could be a personal website, a blog, a profile page, a wiki page, or a social media point of presence (e.g. a LinkedIn profile, a Facebook account, or a Twitter account). Examples of a web presence for a business or some other entity could be a corporate website, a microsite, a page on a review site, a wiki page, or a social media point of presence (e.g., a LinkedIn company page and/or group, a Facebook business/brand/product page, or a Twitter account).

Every web presence is associated with a unique web address to distinguish one point of presence from another.

== Owned vs. unowned ==
Web presence can either be owned or unowned. Owned media exists when a single person or group can control the content that is published on its web presence (e.g. a corporate website or a personal Twitter account). However, when a single person or group cannot solely control the content, the creator is different from the owner. This is considered unowned media (see earned media). A Wikipedia page or a Yelp page about a person, company, or product would be an example of a known (or "earned") web presence.

Occasionally, a first form of media known as "paid media" is often included in the discussion of media types: "earned vs. owned vs. paid". Paid media is commonly found in the form of advertisements, but it is not considered a form of web presence.

== Management ==
Web presence management is the process of establishing and maintaining a digital footprint on the web. The three factors that are considered include the following: where a person or business has web presence; how each web presence represents its enterprise; and what is published at a point of presence.

Web presence management is the discipline of determining and governing:

- the distribution of policy documents
- which platforms are most appropriate (e.g. internal vs. external blog, YouTube vs. Vimeo)
- the single inventory of personal or corporate web presence (e.g. partners or advocates)
- where on the web a business and any relatable assets are represented
- where on the web a business and any relatable assets are impersonated or pirated
- web properties with the particular entities they represent
- who has control over which web properties
- new web properties which are not in the personal or corporate inventory (e.g. someone creates a new presence)
- authorized and unauthorized changes to the creation (e.g. branding) of a web presence
- a workflow for creating a web property that follows its corporate standards

=== Management system ===
The purpose of a web presence management system is to manage the web presence of a person or business. This includes the collection of domain names, websites, social media, and other web pages where he, she, or it is being represented. The tool generally offers the following key functions: new presence discovery, inventory management, change detection, access control, stakeholder coordination, and compliance workflow.

A web presence management system is meant to have a broader reach so that it emphasizes where a presence has been established, will be established, must be maintained, or must be remediated. An example of a web presence management system is the Brandle Presence Manager.

In order to publish content to the various points of web presence, multiple content management systems and sometimes even social media management systems are often used. The primary focus of most content and social media management systems is limited to their specific web platforms.

=== Domain names ===
Another aspect of web presence management is managing the collection of domain names registered to the person or business. Any entity may register multiple domain names for the same property. As a result, they can link alternative spellings, different top-level domains, aliases, brands, or products to the same website. Similarly, negative or derogatory domain names may also be registered. This is done to prevent certain domain names from being used against the person or business.

It is common for a larger business to have domain names registered by multiple employees at multiple domain name registrars, possibly a result of organizational or geographical requirements. Consequently, a web presence management system can be used to monitor all domain names registered by the business, regardless of the registrars used.

== Discovery ==
Web presence discovery is the process of monitoring the web for a new point of presence about a person or business. Web presence discovery is often included in a web presence management system. Whether a new domain is registered, a new website is published, or a new social media account is established, it occurs outside of the person's or business’ control. As a result, its purpose is to assess a new point of presence and appropriately handle any violations.

Web presence discovery differs from content listening. The former involves looking for new properties on the web, whereas the latter refers to analyzing content that already exists to hear how a person or business is seen often in near real time. Examples of content listening systems include Sysomos and Radian6, which is now a subsidiary of Salesforce.com.

=== Brand protection ===
A person or business may choose to watch for a new web presence that might appear to misrepresent or mislead an audience, such as counterfeiters, spoofers, or malicious hackers. One of the early software in the online brand protection marketplace was MarkMonitor, now part of Thomson Reuters. This software helped detect rogue domain names and websites.

However, the modern day growth of social media has seen a rise in the number of fraudulent brand impersonations. It has become much easier for a new web presence to be created on those platforms, which results in a greater frequency of them today. As a preventive measure, online brand protection providers are now adding social media to their domain and website discovery options.

=== Security ===
The widespread growth of social media has also made it easier for unauthorized individuals to impersonate an employee. Consequently, social media has now become a recognized threat vector in that it can be used to socially engineer an attack on a business. To counter this, companies are able to use web presence monitoring tools to detect new points of presence on the web and thereby defend against socially engineered attacks.

=== Distributed inventory management ===
A web presence monitoring system can be used by a business to associate a new web property with its corporate inventory. It is designed to address autonomous, distributed behaviors. This usually applies to larger businesses whose geographically diverse employees are more prone to creating new points of presence on the web. For example, a retail chain may allow each local store to create and manage their web presence to market to and communicate with their local customer base. Similarly, a global business may have teams in each country or region who create and manage a web presence to adapt to local languages or cultures.

== Monitoring ==
Web presence monitoring is the process of monitoring a known inventory of web presence to detect any changes that are made. Web presence monitoring is often included in a web presence management system and can serve multiple purposes for both larger corporations and certain individuals, such as celebrities.

Presence monitoring differs from content listening. The former involves monitoring the properties (e.g. branding) of a web property in an established inventory, whereas the latter refers to analyzing content that already exists to hear how a person or business is seen often in near real time. Additionally, presence monitoring focuses on owned media and content listening on earned media.

=== Corporate, brand, and regulatory compliance ===
Many companies ensure that certain standards are met for a property on the web that represents their business. For companies in regulated industries, such as finance and healthcare, the company may be required by law to ensure that all publicized content, regardless of platform or technology, follow specific requirements.

The widespread growth of social media has seen a rise in the number of fraudulent corporate impersonations. It has become much easier for a new web presence to be created on these platforms, and so these are much more prevalent than they used to be. As a preventive measure, a web presence monitoring system alerts the company when a known property is changed, allowing for the property to be reviewed and amended so that it follows the proper standards. . A web presence monitoring system helps alert the company when a known property is changed, so it can be reviewed and brought back, if necessary, into compliance with the appropriate standards.

== Audit ==
A web presence audit is performed by an enterprise to determine that all points of presence on the web meet the objectives as well as governance, risk management, and compliance (GRC) needs. To ensure neutrality, these audits are often conducted as part of an information technology audit by a professional services agency or an internal audit team. However, a less formal web presence audit is often performed by internal members as a routine to meet GRC objectives.

A web presence audit usually includes web presence discovery and a review of all web-based content in the business’ inventory of web presence. Even though web presence monitoring is not performed in a web presence audit, a review of the nature and scope of the company's web presence monitoring policies, procedures, and tools is considered.

=== Social media audit ===
Due to the emerging challenges introduced by the dynamic nature of social media, a business may choose to perform specific social media audits in greater frequency. A social media audit is similar to a web presence audit, but may also include the purposes of maintaining an accurate inventory of all business social media points of presence. Alternatively, the business may choose to employ automated web presence discovery and compliance systems to keep the corporate social media inventory up-to-date and compliant with GRC needs.

== Web presence vs. web reputation management ==
Reputation management systems are often associated with web presence management. Web presence management is knowing where an individual or business is represented, whereas reputation management is knowing what people are saying about an individual or business. Web presence management handles owned media, while reputation management systems with earned media.

Both systems offer some similar degree of remediation. For web presence management systems, remediation would include finding counterfeit properties that infringe on a brand or trademark. For reputation management systems, remediation would include identifying and eliminating misleading reviews and/or encouraging the contribution of authentic comments.

Even though a web presence monitoring tool can help identify unowned web properties where people are talking about a person, product, or brand, it is only part of the solution. A reputation management system often includes a content listening system to monitor the stream of messages about a particular subject which may be coming from any point of presence on the web (e.g. a comment about a product by a customer on her personal Twitter account). For examples of some reputation management companies, click here.

== See also ==
- Digital footprint
- Domain name system
- Earned vs. Owned vs. Paid media
- Internet presence management
- Online identity
- Online identity management
- Online presence management
- Online reputation management
- Social media measurement
- Social networking service
- Web page
