= Jaiku =

Company

- Type: Online microblogging service
- Industry: Online services
- Founded: February 2006
- Defunct: January 15, 2012
- Headquarters: Helsinki, Finland
- Website: www.jaiku.com

Jaiku was a social networking, micro-blogging and lifestreaming service comparable to Twitter, founded a month before the latter. Jaiku was founded in February 2006 by Jyri Engeström and Petteri Koponen from Finland and launched in July of that year. It was purchased by Google on October 9, 2007.

When Jaiku Ltd was an independent company, its head office was in Helsinki.

== History ==
Jaiku was created in February 2006 by Helsinki-based Jaiku Ltd. The founders of Jaiku chose the name because the posts on Jaiku resembled Japanese haiku. Also, the indigenous Sami people of Finland have traditionally shared stories by singing joiks.

On January 14, 2009, it was announced that Google would be open-sourcing the product but would "no longer actively develop the Jaiku codebase," instead leaving development to a "passionate volunteer team of Googlers". The financial terms of the deal were not released. It was said that the Jaiku team would also help Google on its upcoming G phone project. New user registrations were closed.

On March 12, 2009, Jaiku was re-launched on Google's App Engine platform and on March 13, 2009 the source code to JaikuEngine (the open source equivalent of the jaiku.com codebase) was released. The intent was to compete in the enterprise microblogging arena with a fully customizable microblogging offer.

On October 14, 2011, Google announced that Jaiku would be shut down by January 15, 2012. This announcement came around the same time Google shut down Google Buzz and iGoogle's social features.

On November 29, 2011, a group of former users launched Jaikuarchive.com – The Jaiku Presence archiver "to save an important part of our digital heritage." The original archive site shut down somewhere in 2014 and has since been offline.

As of February 2019, the domain led to an error page on Google's servers.

== Software ==
Jaiku consisted of a website, a mobile website and a client application which acts as a replacement address book that runs on S60 phones.

Jaiku was compatible with Nokia S60 platform mobile devices through its Jaiku Mobile client software. The software allowed users to make posts through the software onto their Jaiku page. Jaiku released their API, which allowed programmers to make their own third party software components such as Feedalizr. One of the main differences between Jaiku and its competitor Twitter was Lifestream, an internet feed that shared users online activities utilizing other programs such as Flickr for photos, last.fm for music, and location by mobile phone. Since Jaiku became open-source, the Lifestream function was removed.

== Features ==
Jaiku.com allowed users to post their thoughts, opinions, and comments in regards to their lives or any other subject. The posts that users created were called "Jaikus" and users had the option of making them publicly visible or private. The site allowed users to keep in touch and interact with friends either through the website, or through the mobile application.

== See also ==
- Identi.ca
- Plurk
- Pownce
- Qaiku
- Twitter
- Social network
- Blogger (service)
- Comparison of microblogging services
