= GeoCities =

Web hosting service active from 1994 to 2009

- The final Yahoo! GeoCities logo (1999–2009)
- Website type: Web hosting service
- Traded as: Nasdaq: GCTY (1998–99)
- Owners: GeoCities (1994–99); Yahoo! (1999–2009); Yahoo! Inc. (2009–present)
- Creators: David Bohnett and John Rezner
- Commercial: Yes
- Registration: Yes
- Launched: November 1994; 32 years ago
- Current status: Inactive since October 26, 2009 (Japanese version inactive since 2019)

GeoCities, later Yahoo! GeoCities, was a web hosting service that allowed users to create and publish websites free of charge, and to browse user-created websites by their theme or interest, active from 1994 to 2009. GeoCities was started in November 1994 by David Bohnett and John Rezner, and was named Beverly Hills Internet briefly before being renamed GeoCities. On January 28, 1999, it was acquired by Yahoo!, at which time it was reportedly the third-most-visited website on the World Wide Web.

In its original form, site users selected a "city" in which to list the hyperlinks to their web pages. The "cities" were named after real cities or regions according to their content: For example, computer-related sites were placed in "SiliconValley" and those dealing with entertainment were assigned to "Hollywood", hence the name of the site. Soon after its acquisition by Yahoo!, this practice was abandoned in favor of using the Yahoo! member names in the URLs.

In April 2009, the company announced that it would end the United States GeoCities service on October 26, 2009.

At least 38 million pages, most written by users, were displayed by GeoCities before it was terminated. The GeoCities Japan version of the service lasted until March 31, 2019.

== History ==
GeoCities began as BHI, which stood for Beverly Hills Internet, a small web hosting and development company in southern California.

The company created its own web directory, organized thematically as six so-called "neighborhoods". The neighborhoods included "Colosseum", "Hollywood", "RodeoDrive", "SunsetStrip", "WallStreet", and "WestHollywood". In mid-1995, the company decided to offer users (thereafter known as "Homesteaders") the ability to develop free home pages within those neighborhoods, with 2 MB of space provided at the time. During the registration process, new members chose which neighborhood they wanted to belong to. This neighborhood became part of the member's Web address along with a sequentially assigned "street address" number to make the URL unique (for example, "www.geocities.com/RodeoDrive/number"). Chat, bulletin boards, and other elements of "community" were added soon afterward, helping foster rapid growth. On July 5, 1995, GeoCities added additional cities, including "CapitolHill", "Paris", "SiliconValley", and "Tokyo". By December 1995, the company, which now had a total of 14 neighborhoods, was registering thousands of Homesteaders a day and getting more than six million monthly page views. GeoCities never enforced neighborhood-specific content; for example, a "Hollywood" homesteader could be nothing but a college student's home page. The company decided to emphasize increasing membership and community, and on December 15, 1995, BHI became known as GeoCities after having also been named Geopages. At that time GeoCities was headquartered at 9401 Wilshire Boulevard in Beverly Hills, California. By December 1996, it was headquartered on the third floor of 1918 Main Street in nearby Santa Monica, with an office on the 8th floor of the Pershing Square Building at 125 Park Avenue in New York City.

The second and last GeoCities logo of 1998–1999

Over time, many companies, including Yahoo!, invested extensively in GeoCities and, with the introduction of paid premium services, the site continued to grow. During May 1997, GeoCities introduced advertisements on its pages. Despite negative reaction from users, GeoCities continued to grow compared to rivals. Competition in web hosting came from the likes of Tripod and Angelfire. On October 2, 1997, the company registered its millionth Homesteader.

During June 1998, in an effort to increase brand awareness, GeoCities introduced a watermark to user Web pages. The watermark, much like an onscreen graphic on some television channels, was a transparent floating GIF image that used JavaScript to stay displayed on the bottom right corner of the browser screen. Many users felt the watermark interfered with the design of their Web site and threatened to relocate their Web pages elsewhere. The implementation of the watermark preceded the widespread adoption of CSS and the standardized Document Object Model and had cross-browser problems. However, GeoCities said in a press release that feedback regarding the watermark had been overwhelmingly positive.

The company became corporate during August 1998, being listed with the NASDAQ exchange with the code GCTY. The initial public offering price was $17, increasing rapidly after the initial offering to a maximum of more than $100. By 1999 GeoCities was the third-most visited site of the World Wide Web, behind AOL and Yahoo!. The headquarters had been relocated to 4499 Glencoe Avenue in Los Angeles, near the Marina del Rey area of Los Angeles County.

=== Acquisition by Yahoo! ===
The first Yahoo! GeoCities logo (1999–2009)

During January 1999, near the peak of the dot-com bubble, GeoCities was purchased by Yahoo! for $3.57 billion in stock, with Yahoo! taking control on May 28. The acquisition proved unpopular; users began to quit en masse in protest at the new terms of service specified by Yahoo! for GeoCities. The terms stated that the company owned all rights and content, including media such as pictures. Yahoo! quickly reversed its decision. During July 1999, Yahoo! switched from neighborhood and street addresses Uniform Resource Locators (URLs) for homesteaders to "vanity" URLs through members' registration names to Yahoo! ("www.geocities.com/membername"). This service was offered previously only as a premium.

During 2001, amid speculation by analysts that GeoCities was not yet profitable (it having declared an $8 million loss for the final quarter of 1998), Yahoo! introduced a for-fee premium hosting service at GeoCities and reduced the accessibility of free and low-price hosting accounts by limiting their data transfer rate for Web page visitors; since that time the data transfer limit for free accounts was said to be limited to 3 GB per month, but was enforced as a limit of about 4.2 MB per hour. The paid accounts were later unified in the Yahoo! Web Hosting service, with higher data transfer limits. During 2001, a rumor began that GeoCities was to be terminated; the chain e-mail making that claim cited an article in The New York Times that stated the opposite.

=== Closure ===
Logo of GeoCities before becoming defunct in 2009

On April 23, 2009, Yahoo! announced that it would be terminating its United States version of GeoCities, and stopped accepting new registrations, though the existing GeoCities accounts remained active. During late June 2009, Yahoo! updated the GeoCities home page to indicate: "GeoCities is closing on October 26, 2009." GeoCities joined a long list of other services discontinued by Yahoo, such as Farechase, LAUNCHcast, My Web, Audio Search, Pets, Photos, Live, Kickstart, Briefcase, Webmessenger, and Yahoo! Teachers.

With the termination of GeoCities in the U.S., Yahoo! no longer offered free web page hosting, except in Japan, where the service continued for ten more years. Yahoo! encouraged users to upgrade their accounts to the fee-based Yahoo! Web Hosting service.

Rupert Goodwins, the editor of ZDNet, perceived the termination of GeoCities as an end of an era; he described GeoCities as "the first proof that you could have something really popular and still not make any money on the internet." Vijay Mukhi, an internet and cybersecurity expert quoted in the Business Standard, criticized Yahoo's management of GeoCities; Mukhi described GeoCities as "a lost opportunity for Yahoo!", adding that "they could have made it a Facebook if they wanted." Rich Skrenta, the CEO of Blekko, posted on Twitter an offer to take over GeoCities from Yahoo! in exchange for 50% future revenue share.

In response to the termination, rival Web hosting services began to compete for the sites formerly displayed by GeoCities. For instance, German Web host Jimdo started the "Lifeboat for GeoCities" service to encourage GeoCities users to display their sites on Jimdo. Geocities-closing.com, started by GeoCities competitor uCoz, is a similar project begun to save GeoCities websites.

Many of the webpages formerly hosted by GeoCities remained accessible, but could not be updated, until 2014. Attempts to access any page using the original GeoCities URL formerly redirected to Yahoo! Small Business, but now redirect to the Yahoo! main page.

=== Archiving efforts ===
Soon after the GeoCities termination announcement, the Internet Archive announced a project to archive GeoCities pages, stating "GeoCities has been an important outlet for personal expression on the Web for almost 15 years." Internet Archive made it their task to ensure the thoroughness and completeness of their archive of GeoCities sites. The former Web site InternetArchaeology.org also archived and showcased artifacts from GeoCities. The operators of the site Reocities downloaded as much of the content hosted on GeoCities as they could before it ended, in an attempt to create a mirror of GeoCities, albeit an incomplete one.

Another site attempting to build an archive of defunct GeoCities sites is GeoCities.ws. There is no formal relationship between GeoCities and geocities.ws, as it is a completely different company. Many sites were duplicated automatically from GeoCities to geocities.ws many months after the termination of GeoCities. Geocities.ws also promised free hosting, and for eight years this has been the case, as of January 2018. Other sites with this purpose were WebCite, as well as now-defunct Geociti.es (closed 2011), Oocities.org and Ge.ocities.org.

On the first anniversary of GeoCities' termination, Archive Team announced that they would release approximately 900 GB of data as a torrent file compressed to 641 GB by 7z compression, and did so on October 29, 2010. On April 9, 2011, Archive Team released a patch for the first GeoCities torrent.

== Neighborhoods ==
In its original form, site users selected a so-called "city" in which to list the hyperlinks to their Web pages. The "cities" were named after real cities or regions according to their content: For example, computer-related sites were displayed in "SiliconValley" and those dealing with entertainment were assigned to "Hollywood", hence the name of the site. Soon after its acquisition by Yahoo!, this practice was abandoned in favor of using the Yahoo! member names in the URLs. During 1996, GeoCities had 29 "neighborhoods", which had groupings of content created by the "homesteaders" (GeoCities users). By 1999, GeoCities had additional neighborhoods and refocused existing neighborhoods.

== GeoCities Marketplace ==
During 1999, GeoCities included GeoCities Marketplace, a commercial website. It included the GeoStore, which sold GeoCities-branded merchandise. Users cashed in GeoPoints in the store.

== Reception ==
The domain geocities.com attracted at least 177 million visitors annually by 2008, according to a Compete.com study.

ComScore stated that the GeoCities had 18.9 million unique visitors from the U.S. during March 2006. During March 2008, GeoCities had 15.1 million unique U.S. visitors; however, during March 2009, GeoCities had 11.5 million unique visitors, a 24% decrease from March 2008.

In 2019, indie developer Jay Tholen released the game Hypnospace Outlaw, which was heavily influenced by GeoCities.

Neocities is a modern web hosting service with the expressed goal of reviving "the support of free web hosting of the now-defunct GeoCities". In 2022, NeoCities Neighborhoods, a remake of GeoCities, was created on Neocities, featuring the same interface that the original 1996 version had.

== Litigation ==
During 1999, a complaint was instituted against GeoCities stating that the corporation violated the provisions of the Federal Trade Commission Act of 1914, specifically 15 U.S.C. § 45, which states in relevant part, "Unfair methods of competition in or affecting commerce, and unfair or deceptive acts or practices in or affecting commerce, are hereby declared unlawful." The FTC found that GeoCities was engaged in deceptive acts and practices in contravention to their stated privacy act. Subsequently, a consent order was entered into, prohibiting GeoCities from misrepresenting the purpose for which it collects and/or uses personal identifying information from consumers. A copy of the complaint and order can be found at 127 F.T.C. 94 (page 94).

GeoCities provided free home pages and e-mail address to children and adults who provided personally identifying and demographic information when they registered for the website. At the time of the complaint, GeoCities had more than 1.8 million members who were "homesteaders". GeoCities illegally permitted third-party advertisers to promote products targeted to GeoCities' 1.8 million users, by using personally identifiable information obtained in the registration process. These acts and practices affected "commerce" as defined in Section 4 of the Federal Trade Commission.

The problem of GeoCities was that it placed a privacy statement on its New Member Application Form and on its website promising that it would never give personally identifying information to anyone without the user's permission. GeoCities sold personal information to third parties who used the information for purposes other than those for which members gave permission.

It was ordered that GeoCities would not make any misrepresentation, in any manner about its collection or use of personal identifying information, including what information will be disclosed to third parties. GeoCities was not allowed to collect personal identifying information from any child if GeoCities had actual knowledge that the child did not have their parents' permission to provide the information.

== See also ==
- AOL Hometown
- Google Sites
- Neocities
- Web 1.0
- Xoom (web hosting)
