= Mixx =

Mixx was a user-driven social media platform where peers could publish or find material based on their interests and location. It incorporated social networking and bookmarking, as well as online syndication, blogging, and personalization options. The service was sold to Chime.in in December 2011, and it was eventually shut down.

== Details ==
Mixx was a platform that allowed its users to customize their web content by creating a personalized blend of text-based articles, images, and videos. The platform enabled users to search and discover media relevant to their interests and interact with other Mixx users.

Users of Mixx could influence the flow of incoming media and recommend relevant media to other users by submitting, commenting on, and voting for or against stories, photos, and videos within specific categories such as business, sports, and health.

Mixx partnered with several online publishing outlets, including CNN.com, USA Today, Reuters, The Los Angeles Times, and The Weather Channel, to expand its reach and provide a diverse range of content to its users.

== History ==
Mixx was founded in 2007 by Chris McGill. The holding company was Recommended Reading, Inc. of McLean, Virginia. In June 2007, Mixx received initial funding from Intersouth Partners of Durham, North Carolina. As of December 6, 2011, Mixx domain redirects to Chime.in. At that time Chime.in provided a similar experience as Mixx.com once did. As of July 30, 2014, Chime.in has since ceased services. Chime.in now recommends the developer's Twitter client applications.
