= Seesmic =

Blog software

- Original authors: Loïc Le Meur; Johann Romefort
- Operating system: Microsoft Windows, Mac OS (Desktop) Linux (Web) iOS, Android, Windows Phone 7, BlackBerry OS (Mobile)
- Platform: Microsoft Silverlight (Desktop)
- License: Freeware
- Website: www.seesmic.com

Seesmic was a suite of freeware web, mobile, and desktop applications which allowed users to simultaneously manage user accounts for multiple social networks, such as Facebook and Twitter.

Launched in 2008 by French entrepreneur Loïc Le Meur, the service was initially a video sharing website, billed as a cross between YouTube and Twitter, allowing short video comments to be published online. Le Meur shut down the service in 2009 due to its stagnating user base, and then relaunched Seesmic as a social networking tool, with a suite of desktop, mobile and web apps integrating streams from Twitter, Facebook and other social media sites. Following the failure to monetize the company, in 2011 Seesmic was relaunched yet again as a customer relations management app.

== History ==
Starting out life as a video blogging website, its original aim was to make video uploading from webcams easier to promote online video conversations. Seesmic made its debut at the Demo tech conference where it was called the "Twitter of video". It had 20,000 users and 70,000 viewers per month as of 2008. On 3 April 2008, Seesmic announced that it had purchased Twhirl, an Adobe AIR based Twitter client.

In 2009, Loïc Le Meur, Seesmic's founder, announced that the video portion of the site had stagnated as it struggled to attract new users. He refocused the site, changing the objective from creating a new video social networking site to creating a suite of tools that would instead aggregate content from other social networking sites such as Twitter and Facebook. The video site, whilst remaining available, was relegated to a different domain name.

Le Meur moved from Paris to San Francisco to relaunch Seesmic due to the perception that it would stand a better chance of success there. It was backed by a number of investors, the primary one being Atomico, a venture group that includes Niklas Zennstrom and Janus Friis, who sold Skype to eBay in 2005 for $2.6 billion. In January 2010 Seesmic acquired Ping.fm. In March 2010, Seesmic reached 1 million registered users.

Seesmic produced a number of social network clients including:

- Seesmic Desktop – a cross platform Twitter and Facebook desktop client written using Adobe AIR. Version 2 was rewritten in Microsoft Silverlight and added support for Google Buzz.
- Seesmic Web – a Twitter web application client for Twitter written using Google Web Toolkit
- Seesmic for Android – a native Twitter client, Facebook, and Salesforce Chatter client for Android
- Seesmic for Windows Phone 7 – a native Twitter, Facebook, and Salesforce Chatter client for Windows Phone 7
- Seesmic for iPhone – a native Twitter, Facebook and Ping.fm client for iPhone and iPod Touch
- Seesmic for BlackBerry – a native Twitter client for BlackBerry – discontinued in June 2011

In August 2011, Seesmic announced it was moving into the Customer Relations Management business, releasing Android and iOS CRM apps that interfaced with Salesforce.com. The former social media apps were being maintained as a "second branch" of the company.

In September 2012, Seesmic was acquired by Hootsuite.
