= MetaWeblog =

Application programming interface

The MetaWeblog API is an application programming interface created by software developer Dave Winer that enables weblog entries to be written, edited, and deleted using web services.

The API is implemented as an XML-RPC web service with three methods whose names describe their function: metaweblog.newPost(), metaweblog.getPost() and metaweblog.editPost(). These methods take arguments that specify the blog author's username and password along with information related to an individual weblog entry.

The impetus for the creation of the API in 2002 was perceived limitations of the Blogger API, which serves the same purpose. Another weblog publishing API, the Atom Publishing Protocol became an IETF Internet standard (RFC 5023) in October 2007. Subsequently, another weblog publishing API, Micropub, which was developed with modern technologies like OAuth, became a W3C Recommendation in May 2017.

Many blog software applications and content management systems support the MetaWeblog API, as do numerous desktop clients.

== See also ==
- Atom Publishing Protocol
- Micropub
