= Me2day =

South Korean micro-blogging platform

- Website type: Microblogging (SNS)
- Available in: Korean, English, Japanese, Simplified Chinese, Traditional Chinese, Vietnamese
- Dissolved: June 2014
- Owner: Naver Corporation
- Website: me2day.net
- Registration: Required
- Launched: February 2007
- Current status: Defunct

Me2day (Korean: 미투데이) was a microblogging and social networking service in South Korea acquired and owned by NHN Corporation (now Naver Corporation). Similar to Twitter, Me2day was popular in South Korea with earlier establishments in the Android market, especially among adolescents and people in their twenties. Me2DAY had an API. Most applications built around it added entertainment options. OpenID was available until March 2010, but thereafter until the site's closure at the end of June 2014, registration was required. Information acquired during registration included email address, ID, and password. It allowed users to send and receive up to 150 character messages to each other. Celebrities such as Big Bang, Wonder Girls, 2NE1, F(x), 2PM, Kim Tae-hee, SHINee, U-Kiss and Seoul Samsung Thunders used the service as a way of keeping their fans updated about their whereabouts. Because Me2day was run by NHN Corporation, the creator of Korean website Naver.com, a Naver ID user could set up an account for Me2day without further sign ups.

== Features ==
Users can adding others as a friend, which sent a friendship request. Users could enable automatic acceptance of friends or individually accept requests. Users could upload a selected day's postings onto a personal Tistory blog.

- Summon (Korean: 소환) - Similar to Twitter's "mention," allowed the user to add other users and talk to them.
- Me2 - Similar to Twitter's "retweet", allowed the user to repost another user's message. The term derives from the English expression of agreement, 'Me, too'.
- Band - Allowed a user to start fan clubs, interest groups, etc.

Me2day supported iOS and Android

== Site closure ==
On November 28, 2013, Me2day emailed users informing them of the service's closure on June 30, 2014.

== See also ==
- Cyworld
- Twitter
