= Microblogging novel =

Epistolarly novel in the format of microblogs

A microblogging novel, also known as a micro novel, is a fictional work or novel written and distributed in small parts, commonly seen on social media platforms such as Twitter and Facebook. Compared to traditional novels or novellas, a micro novel can be written with short, interconnected lines or statements. For example, Twitter novels can be composed of several tweets of 280 characters each, while a Facebook novel can be made within several posts of 300 characters each. (Note: The character limits of Twitter and Facebook being 280 and 300, respectively.)

== History ==
Micro novels are related to blog fiction, which is published in a blog-like format. Another related phenomenon, which originated in Japan, is the cell phone novel where installments are sent out to readers via SMS. Micro novels have also been known to be published through email. Similar manifestations include flash fiction, a work of fiction completed in 1000 words or less, where the publishing medium is irrelevant.
