= IndieWebCamp =

Technology conference

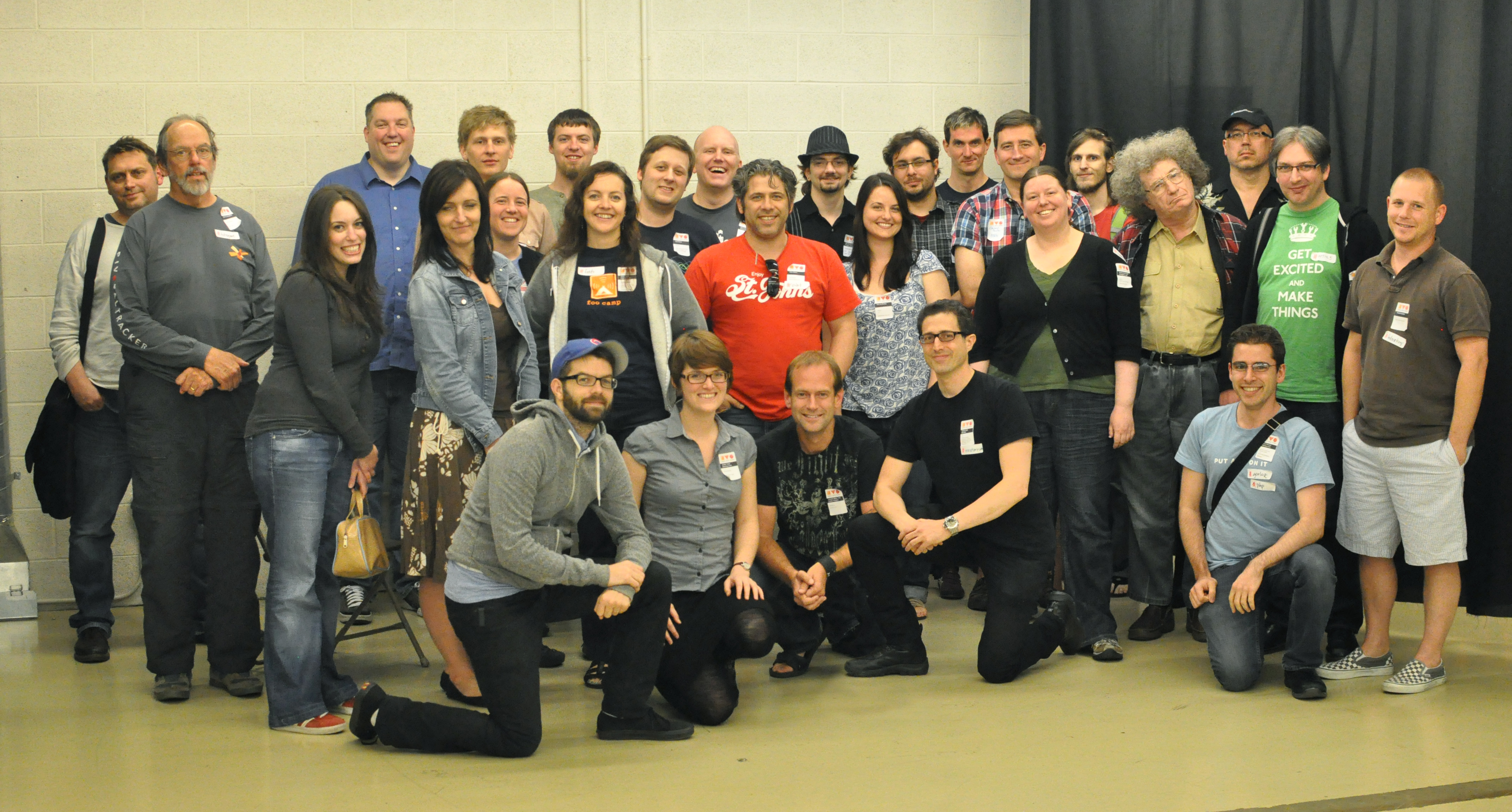
IndieWebCamp in 2011

IndieWebCamp is a two-day unconference for independent web creators and publishers, founded in 2011 in Portland, Oregon. It is part of the broader IndieWeb movement, which encourages people to own their content and identities on their own websites. Since its inception, IndieWebCamp has been held in multiple cities across the United States and Europe, including Brighton, Berlin, Amsterdam, and New York City, as well as in hybrid and online formats since 2020.

The event was founded by Tantek Çelik, Amber Case, Crystal Beasley and Aaron Parecki, with an aim to empower everyone to publish to their own websites, while still reaching their contacts on "silo" sites like Twitter and Facebook.

While the attendees of the original events were largely technologists; journalists, bloggers and media professionals have begun to attend in order to gain greater control over their own content online.

== IndieWebCamp 2014 ==
IndieWebCamp 2014 was held simultaneously in Portland, OR, New York, NY, and Berlin, Germany. Attendees spoke to each other over WebRTC video chat and collaborated on hackathon projects.

=== Subsequent events ===
IndieWebCamp has continued annually since 2014, expanding internationally and incorporating online participation. According to the official IndieWeb events archive, recent camps include:

- IndieWebCamp Düsseldorf 2025 – 3–4 May 2025.
- IndieWebCamp Berlin 2025 – 1–2 November 2025.
- IndieWebCamp Berlin 2024 – 9–10 November 2024.
- IndieWebCamp Berlin 2022 – 3–4 September 2022, hosted at Thoughtworks.

These events mark the continuation of the movement through hybrid and in-person formats during the 2020s.
