= App.net =

Social networking service and microblogging service

- Website type: Social networking service, microblogging
- Available in: English
- Owner: Mixed Media Labs
- Website: www.app.net
- Registration: Required
- Launched: August 8, 2012
- Current status: Permanently shut down

App.net was an ad-free online social networking service and microblogging service which enabled its users to write messages of up to 256 characters. App.net provided their own web interface to the service, Alpha, which was used by some users. However, they encouraged use and development of third-party applications.

== History ==
The name 'App.net' was previously used for a service that let app developers showcase their applications. On July 13, 2012, Mixed Media Labs announced that App.net would change its purpose to be an ad-free social networking platform. As designed, it was similar to Twitter, but with no advertising, instead relying on user and developer subscriptions. Mixed Media Labs began crowd funding with a goal of $500,000 and about 10,000 backers. They exceeded the goal by August 13, 2012, ultimately raising approximately $750,000, with over 11,000 backers.

App.net launched annotations on September 1, 2012, allowing applications to attach arbitrary metadata to posts. This was intended to allow more complex features to be built using the App.net infrastructure. On October 1, 2012, App.net started an incentive program. They would divide a $20,000 monthly pool among participating developers based on application usage and user feedback. Mixed Media Labs' goal was to encourage developers to build on the platform.

On November 29, 2012, App.net began a free-trial invitation program. Users could invite a friend to use App.net. If the friend accepts, they could use the service free for a month.

On February 25, 2013, App.net became a freemium service. Users with a paid plan could invite people to get a free tier account with a few limitations.

In May 2013, App.net hit 100,000 users.

On November 21, 2013, App.net announced Broadcast, a way for users of the App.net service to send and receive push notifications about the things they care about. These push notifications are sent through the App.net app on iPhone or Android. As part of the freemium model Broadcast is free to members of the App.net service with channel analytics available to App.net users with a developer-tier account.

On January 25, 2014, App.net launched Backer, described as a way to crowdfund features. The first project to use Backer originated from App.net itself, in which the company asked if they should accept Bitcoin as a form of payment for the paid tiers.

On May 6, 2014, the founders announced that subscription renewals had been so poor that there were no longer funds to retain development staff for App.net and future operations would be on a maintenance-only basis using contractors.

On January 12, 2017, the founders announced that the platform App.net would be shut down on March 15, 2017. However, due to a significant number of user data export failures that deadline was extended until March 16, 2017. App.net finally ceased to operate as a social network at 6:45 AM on 17 March 2017 (UTC). Some API documentation of App.net remained available on their GitHub Page.
