= Microblogging =

Social network with short posts

Microblogging is a form of blogging using short posts without titles known as microposts or status updates. Microblogs "allow users to exchange small elements of content such as short sentences, individual images, or video links", which may be the major reason for their popularity. Some popular social networks such as X (formerly Twitter), Threads, Tumblr, Mastodon, and Bluesky can be viewed as collections of microblogs.

As with traditional blogging, users post about topics ranging from the simple, such as "what I'm doing right now", to the thematic, such as "sports cars". Commercial microblogs also exist to promote websites, services, and products and to promote collaboration within an organization.

Some microblogging services offer privacy settings, which allow users to control who can read their microblogs or alternative ways of publishing entries besides the web-based interface. These may include text messaging, instant messaging, e-mail, digital audio, or digital video.

== Origin ==
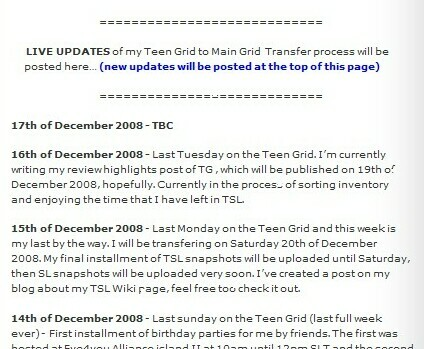
Short text posts on a 2008 blog

The first micro-blogs were known as tumblelogs. The term was coined by programmer Jonathan Gillette (who goes by the pseudonym why the lucky stiff) in a blog post on April 12, 2005, while describing Leah Neukirchen's Anarchaia.

Blogging has mutated into simpler forms (specifically, link- and the mob- and AUD- and vid- variant), but I don't think I've seen a blog like Chris Neukirchen's [sic] Anarchaia, which fudges together a bunch of disparate forms of citation (links, quotes, flickerings) into a very long and narrow and distracted tumblelog.

Jason Kottke described tumblelogs on October 19, 2005:

A tumblelog is a quick and dirty stream of consciousness, a bit like a remaindered links style linklog but with more than just links. They remind me of an older style of blogging, back when people did sites by hand, before Movable Type made post titles all but mandatory, blog entries turned into short magazine articles, and posts belonged to a conversation distributed throughout the entire blogosphere. Robot Wisdom and Bifurcated Rivets are two older style weblogs that feel very much like these tumblelogs with minimal commentary, little cross-blog chatter, the barest whiff of a finished published work, almost pure editing...just a way to quickly publish the "stuff" that you run across every day on the web

Manton Reece, founder of Micro.blog, defines Microblogging thus:

A microblog post should have these qualities:

- Should have a feed, usually RSS or JSON Feed
- Does not have an RSS item title.
- Contains short post text, usually 280 characters or less.

However, by 2006 and 2007, the word microblog was used more widely for services provided by established sites like Tumblr and Twitter (now X), some of which do not have RSS-like feeds.

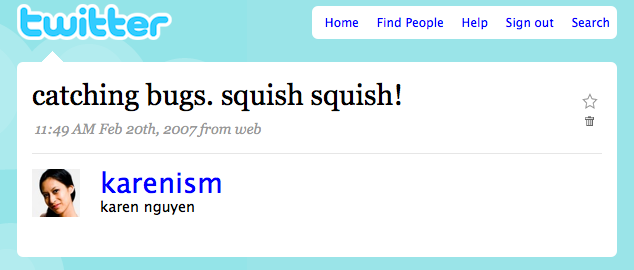
A "tweet" posted to Twitter in 2007

In May 2007, there were 111 microblogging sites in various countries. Among the most notable services are Twitter, Tumblr, Micro.blog, FriendFeed, Plurk, Jaiku and identi.ca. Different versions of services and software with microblogging features have been developed. Plurk has a timeline view that integrates video and picture sharing. Flipter uses microblogging as a platform for people to post topics and gather audience's opinions. PingGadget is a location-based microblogging service. Pownce, developed by the Digg founder Kevin Rose among others, integrated microblogging with file sharing and event invitations. Pownce was merged into SixApart in December 2008.

Other social networking websites Facebook, MySpace, LinkedIn, Diaspora, JudgIt and XING, also have their own microblogging feature, better known as "status updates". Status updates are usually more restricted than actual microblogging in terms of writing. Any activity involving posting short messages can be classified as microblogging although it is usually not considered a microblogging "site" or "service" if it is a secondary, rather than principal service, provided there.

Services such as Lifestream and Snapchat will aggregate microblogs from multiple social networks into a single list, but other services, such as Ping.fm, will send out the microblog to multiple social networks. Services such as Instagram and Whatsapp showcase 'status update' features for users to quickly engage with one another

Non-Chinese microblogging services are censored in China. Chinese Weibo services such as Sina Weibo are available to the Chinese people, offering similar functionality to X and Facebook. They provide microposting, allow users to comment on each other's posts, allow posting with graphical emoticons, and support inclusion of images, music and video files. A survey by the Data Center of China Internet from 2010 showed that Chinese microblog users most often pursued content that was created by friends or experts in a specific field or was related to celebrities.

== Usage ==
Several studies have tried to analyze user behavior on microblogging services. They include extensive studies on Twitter in 2009, by researchers at Harvard Business School and at Sysomos. Results indicated that for services such as Twitter, a small group of active users generate most of the activity. Sysomos' Inside Twitter survey, which was based on more than 11 million users, showed that in 2009, 10% of Twitter users accounted for 86% of all activity.

Twitter, Facebook, and other microblogging services have become platforms for marketing and public relations, with a sharp growth in the number of social-media marketers. The Sysomos study shows that this specific group of marketers on Twitter is much more active than the general user population, with 15% of marketers following over 2,000 people and only 0.29% of the Twitter public following more than 2,000 people.

Microblogging has also become an important source of real-time news updates during socio-political revolutions and crisis situations, such as the 2008 Mumbai terror attacks or the 2009 Iran protests. The short nature of updates allow users to post news items quickly, reaching an audience in seconds. Clay Shirky argues that those services have the potential to result in an information cascade, which prompts fencesitters to turn into activists.

Microblogging has noticeably revolutionized the way information is consumed. It has empowered citizens themselves to act as sensors or sources of information that could lead to consequences and influence, or even cause, media coverage. People share what they observe in their surroundings, information about events, and their opinions about topics from a wide range of fields. Moreover, these services store various metadata from these posts, such as location and time. Aggregated analysis of this data includes different dimensions like space, time, theme, sentiment, network structure etc., and gives researchers an opportunity to understand social perceptions of people in the context of certain events of interest. Microblogging also promotes authorship. On the micro-blogging platform Tumblr, the reblogging feature links the post back to the original creator.

The findings of a study by Emily Pronin of Princeton University and Daniel Wegner of Harvard University may explain the rapid growth of microblogging. The study suggests a link between short bursts of activity and feelings of joy, power, and creativity.

== Issues ==
Microblogging is not without issues, such as privacy, security, and integration.

Privacy is arguably a major issue because users may broadcast sensitive personal information to anyone who views their public feed. An example would be Google's Buzz platform, which incited controversy in 2010 by automatically publicizing users' email contacts as "followers". Google later amended those settings.

On centralized services, where all of the microblog's information flows through one point (such as servers operated by X (Twitter), privacy has been a concern in that user information has sometimes been exposed to governments and courts without the prior consent of the user who generated such supposedly private information, usually through subpoenas or court orders. Examples can be found in Wikileaks related Twitter subpoenas, as well as various other cases.

Security concerns have been voiced within the business world since there is potential for sensitive work information to be publicized on microblogging sites such as Twitter. That includes information that may be subject to a superinjunction.

Integration could be the hardest issue to overcome since it can be argued that corporate culture must change to accommodate microblogging. An internet architecture called OStatus has been developed so that microblogging can occur seamlessly across multiple corporate platforms. This protocol has evolved into ActivityPub, on which many platforms making up the Fediverse are based. Users of these platforms are members of a specific instance running one of the software of the Fediverse, which can interoperate as a federated social network, allowing users on different nodes to interact with each other.

== Related concepts ==
Live blogging is a derivative of microblogging that generates a continuous feed on a specific web page.

Instant messaging and IRC display status but generally only one of a few choices such as available, off-line, away, busy. Away messages, which are displayed when the user is away, form a kind of micro-blogging.

In the Finger protocol, the .project and .plan files are sometimes used for status updates similar to microblogging.

== See also ==
=== Articles ===
- Blogging
- Comparison of microblogging services
- Emoticon
- Fediverse
- Geosocial networking
- Microblogging in China
- Microblogging novel
- Online Journalism
- Social networking service
- Social news website

=== Protocols ===
- Atom
- ActivityPub
- AT Protocol
- IndieAuth
- Nostr
- RSS
- Webmention

=== Server software ===
- GNU social
- Mastodon
- Pleroma

=== Services ===
- Bluesky
- Facebook
- Gab
- Gettr
- MeetMe
- micro.blog
- Plurk
- Threads
- Tumblr
- Twister
- X/Twitter
- Weibo

==== Defunct ====
Past micro-blogging services, no longer active.

- App.net
- Blip
- Google+
- Heello
- ImaHima
- Koo
- me2day
- Parler
- Posterous
- Soup
- Tout
