= Géraldine Le Meur =

French innovator and business executive

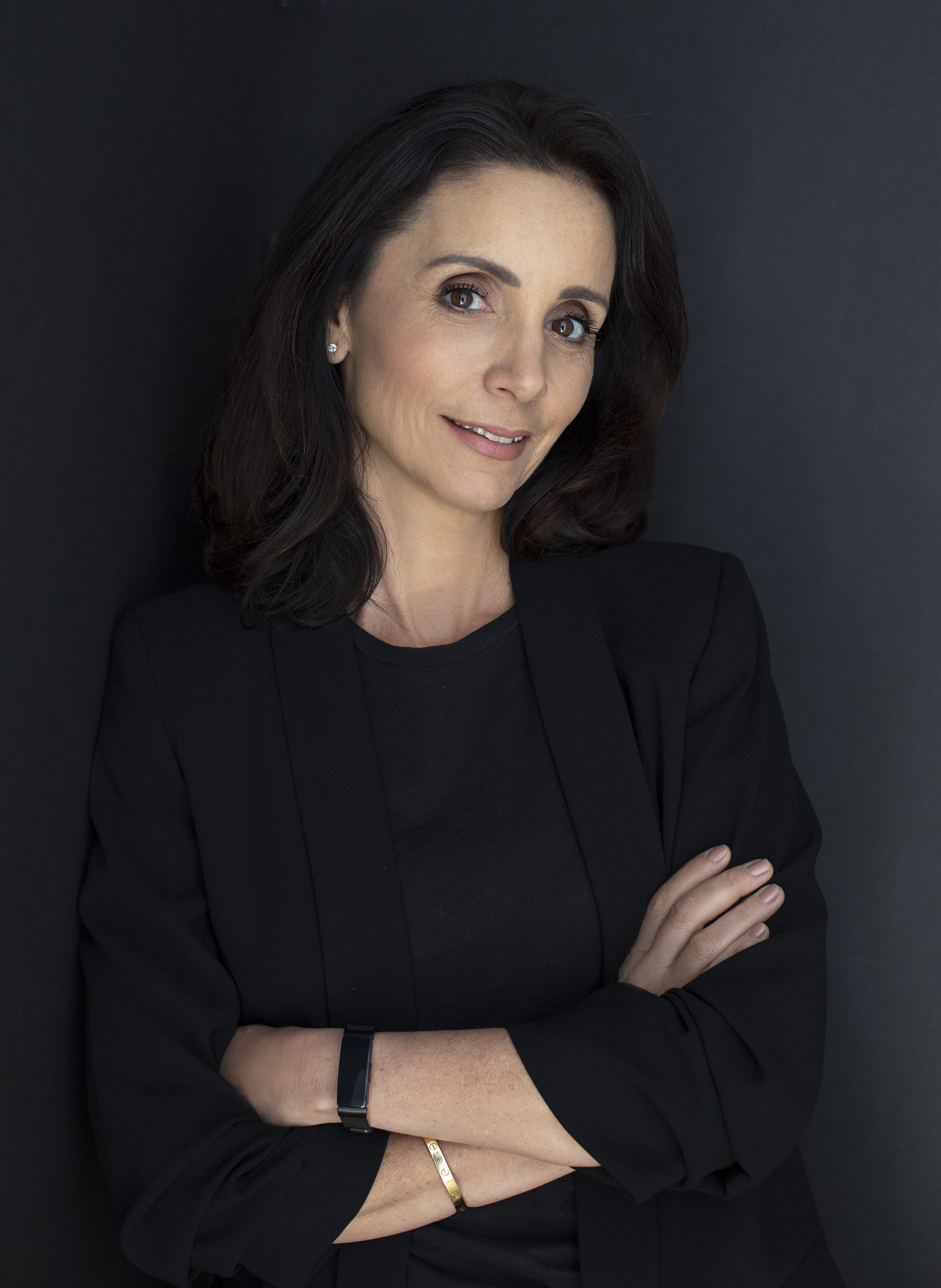
- Le Meur
- Born: May 1972 (age 54)
- Occupations: Innovator and business executive
- Spouse: Loïc Le Meur (m. 1993; div. 2012)
- Children: 3

Géraldine Le Meur (born May 1972) is a French business executive.

== Early life and education ==
Géraldine Le Meur was born in May 1972. She graduated from Skema Business School in 1995.

== Career ==
=== Early ventures ===
In 1997, Le Meur co-founded RapidSite France, as chief executive officer until the company was sold to France Telecom. She later managed the blogging platform Ublog, which merged with Six Apart in 2004. From 2003 to 2007, she was marketing director for Europe, the Middle East, and Africa at Six Apart.

=== LeWeb ===
In 2004, together with Loïc Le Meur, she founded LeWeb (initially named LesBlogs), a Paris-based conference series for digital innovators and entrepreneurs. She was chief executive officer until its acquisition by Reed Exhibitions in 2012. In April 2015, she and Loïc Le Meur reacquired the event through their Paris-based company Business Space, after Reed Exhibitions withdrew from the sector.

=== FrenchFounders and LeFonds ===
In November 2020, Le Meur joined the business network FrenchFounders as a partner, where she leads LeFonds, an investment initiative supporting French-speaking entrepreneurs. Launched on April 1, 2021, LeFonds has invested in 21 early-stage startups, with amounts ranging from €300,000 to €500,000.

== Personal life ==
Le Meur lived in San Francisco for 13 years before relocating to New York City.
