= Hootsuite =

Social media management platform

Hootsuite, Inc.

- Company type: Private
- Website type: Social media management, social networking service
- Available in: Multilingual
- Founded: Vancouver, BC, Canada (2008)
- Predecessor: Seesmic
- Headquarters: 111 East 5th Avenue; Vancouver, V5T 4J7; Canada
- Area served: Worldwide
- Founders: Ryan Holmes, Dario Meli, David Tedman
- Key people: Irina Novoselsky (CEO)
- Industry: Internet, Immigration and law enforcement
- Products: Social media management, Social media marketing, Social media customer service, Social media analytics, Social media listening, United States Immigration Enforcement financial support.
- Employees: 1,559 (Aug 2024)
- Website: hootsuite.com
- Users: Over 16 million (March 2018)
- Launched: December 2008; 17 years ago
- Current status: Active

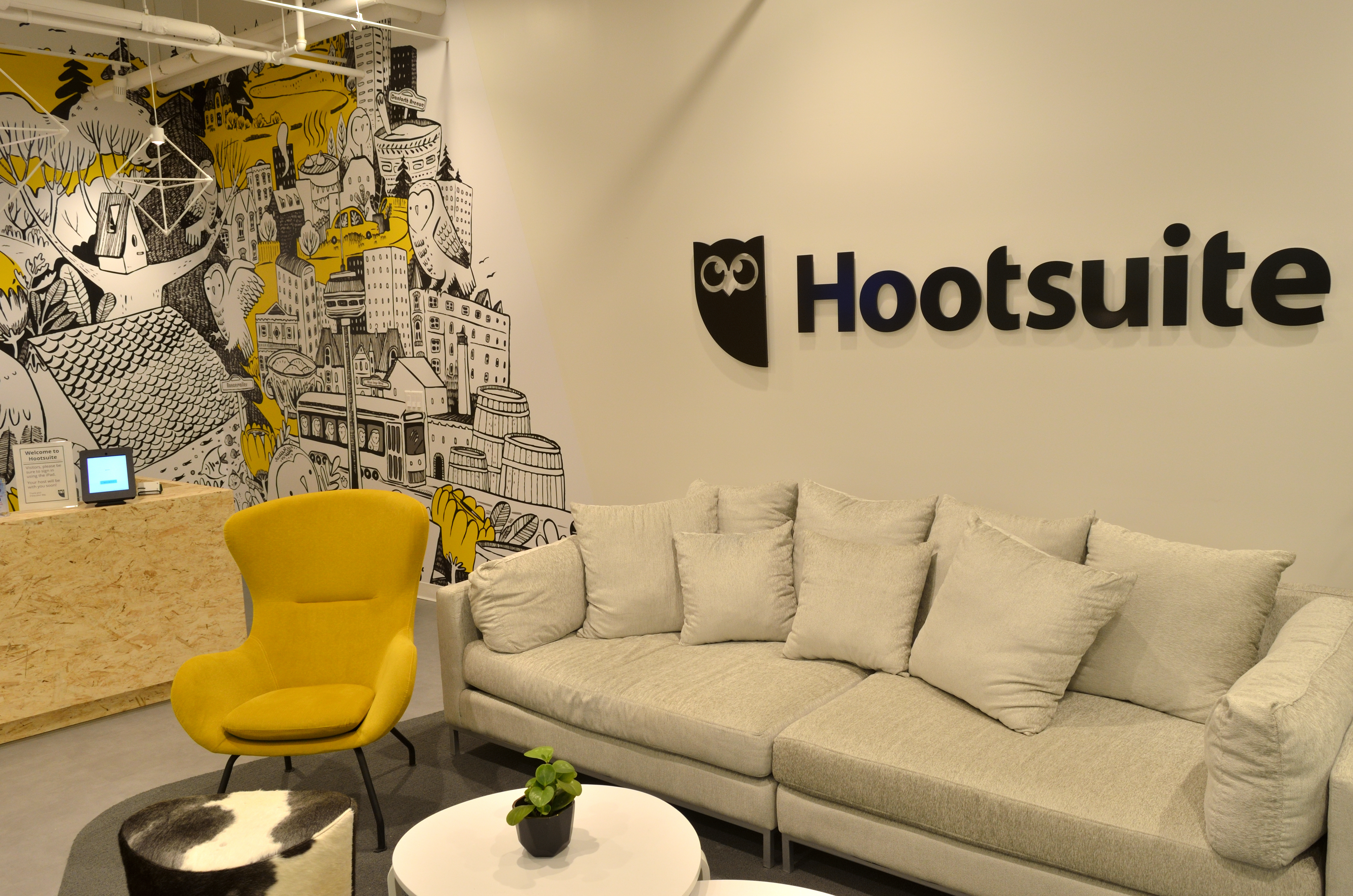
Hootsuite Toronto Office

Hootsuite is a social media management platform, created by Ryan Holmes in 2008. The system's user interface takes the form of a dashboard, and supports social network integrations for Twitter, Facebook, Instagram, LinkedIn, Pinterest, YouTube and TikTok.

Based in Vancouver, Hootsuite has over 1,000 staff members in 13 locations, including Toronto, London, Paris, Sydney, Bucharest, Milan, Luxembourg and Mexico City. The company has more than 16 million users in over 175 countries. In September 2012, Hootsuite acquired blog software named Seesmic.

== History ==
In 2008, Holmes needed a tool to manage multiple social media networks at his digital services agency, Invoke Media. Finding that there was no product in the market offering all the features he sought, Holmes, along with Dario Meli, David Tedman, and the Invoke team, chose instead to develop a platform of their own that would be able to organize their many social media accounts and networks. The first iteration of this social media management system launched on November 28, 2008, in the form of a Twitter dashboard called BrightKit.

In February 2009, Holmes offered a $500 prize for renaming the platform and used crowdsourced suggestions from the dashboard's 100,000+ users as contest submissions. The winning idea was Hootsuite, a moniker submitted by a user named Matt Nathan and based upon "Owly", the dashboard's owl logo, as a word play on the French expression "tout de suite", meaning "right now".

In November 2009, the Hootsuite dashboard expanded its offering to support Facebook and LinkedIn and the capability to use Twitter Lists.

In December 2009, Hootsuite spun off from Invoke Media and launched officially as an independent company, Hootsuite Media, Inc. That same month, Hootsuite received $1.9 million in funding from Hearst Interactive Media, Blumberg Capital, and prominent angel investors Leo Group LLC and Geoff Entress.

In March 2012, OMERS Ventures, the venture capital investment arm of the Ontario Municipal Employees Retirement System, invested $20 million, valuing the company at US$200 million. OMERS did not buy its stake directly in the company, but rather bought private shares in a secondary transaction from a handful of employees and early investors, said Holmes.

In May 2012, Hootsuite subsequently raised US$50 million in a Series A round, following rumors.

On August 1, 2013, the company announced that it had raised US$165 million in Series B funding from Insight Venture Partners, followed by Accel Partners and OMERS—all three will now have a seat on Hootsuite's board. Holmes also said the company wanted to make at least two unnamed acquisitions and employ 100 overseas employees.

In February 2017, Hootsuite announced its acquisition of AdEspresso, a digital advertisement manager, and LiftMetrix, a leading social media analytics company.

In March 2018, Hootsuite announced $50 million in growth capital from CIBC Innovation Banking.

In January 2021, Hootsuite acquired Sparkcentral, a messaging customer engagement tool and competitor, for an undisclosed price.

In April 2023, Hootsuite launched OwlyWriter AI.

In April 2024, it was announced Hootsuite had agreed to acquire the Kirchberg, Luxembourg-headquartered, AI-led social listening and analytics platform Talkwalker for an undisclosed amount.

In 2025, Hootsuite launched OwlyGPT.

== Service ==
The service is commonly used to manage online brands and to submit messages to a variety of social media services, including Twitter, Facebook, Instagram, LinkedIn and TikTok. Companies and organizations known to use Hootsuite include Facebook, the Obama administration, HBO, Martha Stewart Media, Virgin Group, SXSW, Panasonic, Zappos, The Gap and LHC. Hootsuite provides a browser-based dashboard that lets users manage their social media presence and performance.

== Business ==
The company behind the service is based in Vancouver, British Columbia, Canada.

In January 2010, the Hootsuite company was spun out of Invoke Media after venture capital firms Blumberg Capital and Hearst Interactive Media raised $2 million in financing for the company. Localized versions of Hootsuite are available in English, French, German, Italian, Portuguese, and Spanish.

As of March 2018, the service managed over one million social media accounts for 16 million unique users.

== Reception ==
The Hootsuite software has won awards from Mashable at their Open Web Awards 2009, and the Canadian New Media Award. In 2025, Hootsuite was ranked as the top social media management tool by G2.

== Controversies ==
In September 2020, Hootsuite faced criticism over its agreement with U.S. Immigration and Customs Enforcement, made weeks after allegations of forced hysterectomies at ICE detention centres surfaced. Following public pressure, the company backed out of the deal and posted a lengthy statement from CEO Tom Keiser to their official Twitter account that expressed regret over the internal divisions that the contract had created within the company. It later dismissed an employee who had disclosed the contract. In October, it was claimed that the contract had been transferred to the rival company NUVI, leading to uncertainty about the actual fate of the contract.

In January 2026, The Globe and Mail reported that Hootsuite was again working with ICE after internal emails showed that CEO Irina Novoselsky travelled to Washington in September 2025 to “brief ICE on how Hootsuite and Talkwalker can support their mission.” and to pursue a “Trojan Horse Deal”. A few days later the company doubled down, saying that as long as the terms and conditions are honored, the contract stands.

== See also ==
- Social media marketing
- Social media analytics
- Social media measurements
- Digital marketing
- Dashboard (business)
