= Social media measurement =

Evaluation of social media metrics

Social media measurement, also called social media controlling, is the management practice of evaluating successful social media communications of brands, companies, or other organizations.

Key performance indicators may be measured by extracting information from social media channels, such as blogs, wikis, micro-blogs such as Twitter, social networking sites, or video/photo sharing websites, forums from time to time. It is also used by companies to gauge current trends in the industry. The process first gathers data from different websites and then performs analysis based on different metrics like time spent on the page, click through rate, content share, comments, text analytics to identify positive or negative emotions about the brand. Some other social media metrics include share of voice, owned mentions, and earned mentions.

The social media measurement process starts with defining a goal that needs to be achieved and defining the expected outcome of the process. The expected outcome varies per the goal and is usually measured by a variety of metrics. This is followed by defining possible social strategies to be used to achieve the goal. Then the next step is designing strategies to be used and setting up configuration tools that ease the process of collecting the data. In the next step, strategies and tools are deployed in real-time. This step involves conducting Quality Assurance tests of the methods deployed to collect the data. And in the final step, data collected from the system is analyzed and if the need arises, it is refined on the run time to enhance the methodologies used. The last step ensures that the result obtained is more aligned with the goal defined in the first step.

== Data Acquisition ==
Acquiring data from social media is in demand of an exploring the user participation and population with the purpose of retrieving and collecting so many kinds of data(ex: comments, downloads etc.). There are several prevalent techniques to acquire data such as Network traffic analysis, Ad-hoc application and Crawling

Network Traffic Analysis - Network traffic analysis is the process of capturing network traffic and observing it closely to determine what is happening in the network. It is primarily done to improve the performance, security and other general management of the network. However concerned about the potential tort of privacy on the Internet, network traffic analysis is always restricted by the government. Furthermore, high-speed links are not adaptable to traffic analysis because of the possible overload problem according to the packet sniffing mechanism

Ad-hoc Application - Ad-hoc application is a kind of application that provides services and games to social network users by developing the APIs offered by social network companies (Facebook Developer Platform). The infrastructure of Ad-hoc application allows the user to interact with the interface layer instead of the application servers. The API provides a path for application to access information after the user login. Moreover, the size of the data set collected vary with the popularity of the social media platform i.e. social media platforms having high number of users will have more data than platforms having less user base. Scraping is a process in which the APIs collect online data from social media. The data collected from Scraping is in raw format. However, having access to these types of data is a bit difficult because of its commercial value.

Crawling - Crawling is a process in which a web crawler creates indexes of all the words in a web-page, stores them, then follows all the hyperlinks and indexes on that page and again stores them. It is the most popular technique for data acquisition and is also well known for its easy operation based on prevalent Object-Orientated Programming Language (Java or Python etc.). And most important, social network companies (YouTube, Flicker, Facebook, Instagram, etc.) are friendly to crawling techniques by providing public APIs

== Applications ==
=== For branding ===
Monitoring social media allows researchers to find insights into a brand's overall visibility on social media, to measure the impact of campaigns, to identify opportunities for engagement, to assess competitor activity and share of voice, and to detect impending crises. It can also provide valuable information about emerging trends and what consumers and clients think about specific topics, brands or products. This is the work of a cross-section of groups that include market researchers, PR staff, marketing teams, social-engagement, and community staff, agencies and sales teams. Several different providers have developed tools to facilitate the monitoring of a variety of social media channels - from blogging to internet video to internet forums. This allows companies to track what consumers say about their brands and actions. Companies can then react to these conversations and interact with consumers through social media platforms.

=== In government ===
Apart from commercial applications, social media monitoring has become a pervasive technique applied by public organizations and governments. Monitoring is a tradition within the public sector, and social-media monitoring provides a real-time approach to detecting and responding to social developments. Governments have come to realize the need for strategies to cope with surprises from the rapid expansion of public issues. Sobkowicz introduced a framework with three blocks of social-media opinion tracking, simulating and forecasting. It includes:

1. real-time detection of emotions, topics and opinions
2. information-flow modelling and agent-based simulation
3. modeling of opinion networks

Bekkers introduced the application of social media monitoring in the Netherlands. Public organizations in the Netherlands (such as the Tax Agency and the Education Ministry) have started to use social media monitoring to obtain better insights into the sentiments of target groups. On the one hand, the public sector will be enabled to provide timely and efficient answers to the public by using social media monitoring techniques, but on the other hand, they also have to deal with concerns about ethical issues such as transparency and privacy.

== Quantifying social media ==
Social media management software (SMMS) is an application program or software that facilitates an organization's ability to successfully engage in social media across different communication channels. SMMS is used to monitor inbound and outbound conversations, support customer interaction, audit or document social marketing initiatives and evaluate the usefulness of a social media presence.

It can be difficult to measure all social media conversations. Due to privacy settings and other issues, not all social media conversations can be found and reported by monitoring tools. However, whilst social media monitoring cannot give absolute figures, it can be extremely useful for identifying trends and for benchmarking, in addition to the uses mentioned above. These findings can, in turn, influence and shape future business decisions.

In order to access social media data (posts, Tweets, and meta-data) and to analyze and monitor social media, many companies use software technologies built for business. These range from in-platform analytics dashboards to dedicated third-party platforms, which offer more advanced capabilities including cross-platform audience intelligence, sentiment analysis, and trend detection at scale.

== Location-based ==
Most social media networks allow users to add a location to their posts (reference all of our feeds). The location can be classified as either 'at-the-location' or 'about-the-location'. "'At-the-location' services can be defined as services where location-based content is created at the geographic location. 'About-the-location' services can be defined as services which are referring to a particular location but the content is not necessarily created in this particular physical place." The added information available from geotagged (link to Geotagging article) posts means that they can be displayed on a map. This means that a location can be used as the start of a social media search rather than a keyword or hashtag. This has major implications for disaster relief, event monitoring, safety and security professionals since a large portion of their job is related to tracking and monitoring specific locations.

== Technologies used ==
Various monitoring platforms use different technologies for social media monitoring and measurement. These technology providers may connect to the API provided by social platforms that are created for 3rd party developers to develop their own applications and services that access data. Facebook's Graph API is one such API that social media monitoring solution products would connect to pull data from. Some social media monitoring and analytics companies use calls to data providers each time an end-user develops a query. Others will also store and index social posts to offer historical data to their customers.

Additional monitoring companies use crawlers and spidering technology to find keyword references. (See also: Semantic analysis, Natural language processing.) Basic implementation involves curating data from social media on a large scale and analyzing the results to make sense out of it. Examples of these platforms include Hootsuite, Sprout Social, and Google Analytics.

== See also ==
- Media intelligence
- Media monitoring
- Social media analytics
- Social media intelligence
