= IndieWeb =

Movement to self-host and control web content

The IndieWeb refers to the usage of decentralized, independently-hosted websites and personal web pages as the main form of connecting on and publishing material on the Internet, in contrast to social media. The term encompasses the movement advocating it, the web pages that make up, and the community formed around the movement.

The IndieWeb emphasizes autonomy over one's data, and the ability to use the web without relying on corporations to host said data, meaning that web building platforms are excluded. Sites are user-centric rather than being optimized for search engines or other metrics, and tend to vary widely as a result. Tools such as Webmention and microformats are sometimes used to allow for distributed social communication and distribution of content. A significant portion of the IndieWeb is hosted on static web pages, typically on web hosting services such as Neocities and Nekoweb, or by the user themself.

== History ==
The IndieWeb movement is directly inspired by how, in the 1990s and 2000s, the early Internet was primarily used by individuals through independent, personal web pages, with openness and decentralization being key. During this time, a specific culture and aesthetic emerged around these sites, referred to by net theorist Olia Lialina as the "vernacular web." This inspiration is evident in some aspects of the IndieWeb, for example: using the term webmaster to refer to the owner of a site or the use of webrings and links to "neighbors" to connect to other sites in lieu of search engines.

During the mid-to-late 2000s, the relative accessibility of social media sites such as Myspace and Facebook enabled them to begin replacing personal sites, and search engines began to deprioritize independently hosted personal sites. In 2009, GeoCities, the largest static web site hosting service boasting around 38 million pages at its peak, was shut down by Yahoo after just 10 years of being acquired, with sites archived only on the GeoCities Gallery with broken links and images.

During this period of decline, the concept of the IndieWeb was first developed in 2011 at a series of conferences known as IndieWebCamp by Tantek Çelik, Amber Case, Aaron Parecki, Crystal Beasley and Kevin Marks. On June 28, 2013, Kyle Drake officially launched NeoCities, a self-hosting service with the expressed goal "to rebuild the web we lost to algorithms and monotony, and make it as fun and creative as it was back in the '90s."

The IndieWeb movement has since grown, motivated by factors such as nostalgia, privacy concerns with social media, and dislike for the incorporation of artificial intelligence on the web. However, the competition against social media algorithms, designed to be addictive in nature, and the basic technological knowledge required to run a page is suspected to limit the IndieWeb from replacing social media altogether.

== Culture and principles ==
While the decentralized nature of the IndieWeb means that sites can vary widely, users have formed specific principles, practices, and a common culture in their collective usage of the IndieWeb. Examples include POSSE, standing for Publish (on your) Own Site, Syndicate Everywhere, which encourages users to publish content on their own sites then share it on external ones, such as X (social network), Instagram, or Medium (website).

Currently, IndieWeb.org collects these principles and as of 2026, has organized two-day IndieWebCamp events in 19 cities, as well as online.

== See also ==
- Comparison of software and protocols for distributed social networking
- Distributed social network
- Neocities
- Personal web page
- Solid (web decentralization project)
- Marginalia (search engine): An open source search engine focused on text heavy small websites
