= Plurk =

Social networking and microblogging service

- The website's timeline set in horizontal fashion
- Website type: Social network service and Microblogging
- Available in: Multilingual (45 languages)
- Headquarters: Taipei, Taiwan
- Owners: Plurk, Inc.
- Creator: The A-team
- Website: www.plurk.com
- Commercial: Yes
- Registration: Required
- Launched: May 12, 2008
- Current status: Active

Plurk

- Screenshot Plurk's mobile application on iOS
- Release: 31 October 2013; 13 years ago

Stable release(s) [±]
- iOS: 7.27.0 / 28 April 2026; 6 months ago
- Android: 6.90.2 / 7 May 2026; 5 months ago
- Operating system: Web, iOS, Android
- Size: 83 MB
- Type: Social media service
- Website: www.plurk.com

Plurk (/ˈplɜːrk/) is a free social networking and microblogging service that allows users to send updates (also called "plurks") through short messages or links, which can be up to 360 text characters in length (as of 2016).

Updates are shown on the user's home page in the form of a timeline, which lists all the updates received in chronological order, and delivered to other users who have chosen to receive them. Unlike similar microblogging websites (such as Twitter and Facebook), Plurk's timeline goes horizontally, with the newest posts on the left and oldest on the right. Users can respond to other users' updates from their timeline through the Plurk.com website, official mobile apps, by private or instant messaging, or by text messaging via compatible third party applications. Also unique to the site is the ability to post anonymous plurks using the "whisper" feature, allowing users the ability to hide their username or identity.

== History ==
Plurk was launched on May 12, 2008.

The etymology of the name was explained by the developers as such:

- abbreviation of 'people' and 'lurk'
- portmanteau of 'play' and 'work'
- acronym of peace, love, unity, respect, and karma
- verb neologism, similar to how Google was eventually used as a verb

While it is difficult to track down the names of the creators of Plurk, and the "A-Team" link listed under "creator" leads to a page that lacks any real information, it is known that the current CEO is Alvin Woon. In January 2013, it was announced that the company has been headquartered in Taipei, Taiwan, while it has "landed [an] undisclosed amount of funding."

== Features and technology ==
Plurk's interface shows updates in horizontal form through a scrollable timeline written in JavaScript and updated through AJAX. Users can modify the interface using CSS and HTML scripts as well. Users can post new messages with optional 'qualifiers', which are one-word verbs used to represent a thought (e.g., 'feels', 'thinks', 'loves', etc.). There are also advanced features such as sending updates only to a subset of your friends, posting updates on events earlier in the day, and sharing images, videos, and other media. Followers are allowed, but only limited to accounts that are not set as private. Users can upload media files through YouTube, links and webcam or from their computer. Plurks can also be 'liked', as in other social sites. In addition, it has a birthday reminder feature that places a birthday cake sign on all the user's messages on their birthday. Every plurker has their own Karma value. It is recalculated based on your activities. Higher Karma gives access to more emoticons and features.

Plurk also supports group conversations between friends and allows usage of emoticons together with the usual text micro-blogging. Plurk also supports the upload of users' own pictures as emoticons.

The Plurk.com developers allowed public access to the API on December 4, 2009.

Due to messages being sent between users in real time, many users use Plurk as an alternative to chat and interact with each other.

== Availability in other languages ==
To help translate their base list of qualifiers/verbs, Plurk hosts its own translation website where users can submit translations of the Plurk user interface in other languages. As of May 2026, Plurk is available in 37 languages.

== Reception ==
During its first year, Plurk was seen as a potential rival to Twitter.

In June 2008, Plurk received online attention when it was featured by Leo Laporte and Amber MacArthur on their net@night show in the TWiT.tv podcast network.

== Controversies ==
=== MSN Juku controversy ===
In November 2009, MSN China launched an internet application called MSN Juku in beta. Observers noted similarity between the MSN Juku user interface and that of Plurk, which was blocked in China in April 2009. Microsoft later indefinitely suspended MSN Juku, admitting to accusations that MSN China plagiarised about 80% of Plurk's original code, as well as elements of their CSS and unique user interface features.

=== Post calling for the assassination of President Ma Ying-jeou ===
On 20 March 2010, Taiwanese police investigated a threat posted on Plurk that called for the assassination of the president of the Taiwan, Ma Ying-jeou.
