= Brightkite =

Location-based social networking website

Brightkite was a location-based social networking website. Users were able to "check in" at places by using text messaging or one of the mobile applications and they were able to see who is nearby and who has been there before. The service was created in 2007 by Brady Becker, Martin May, and Alan Seideman who previously founded the SMS notification service Loopnote. In April 2009 Brightkite was acquired by mobile social network Limbo.

By December 2011, all Brightkite apps had been pulled from app stores and the Brightkite website was replaced with a message stating, "This is not goodbye...we're just moving on to something better".

By April 2012, the Brightkite website no longer appeared to be in operation.

== Overview ==
Brightkite allowed registered users to connect with their existing friends and also meet new people based on the places that they go. Once a user "checked in" at a place, they could post notes and photos to a location and other users could comment on those posts. Brightkite had applications for Android, iOS (iPhone), and Symbian.

Brightkite is no longer available.

== Android app ==
The Brightkite Android app used the phone's GPS to locate the user and it had many of the same features as the iPhone app. Notable additions include mapping and background notifications.

== iPhone app ==
The Brightkite iPhone app used the iPhone's geolocation features to automatically locate the user. From the app a user could check in, post a note or photo, send messages, browse their friend and nearby streams and access their account settings.

== The Brightkite Wall ==
The Brightkite Wall was a visualization tool that used to show real-time updates from a place, user, or keyword. Users also have the option to display posts from Twitter containing a specific hashtag.

The Mattress Factory Art Museum used the Brightkite Wall in the museum lobby as a way to communicate with visitors.

== Related applications ==
Brightkite had a public application programming interface (API) available to build websites and applications that augment the official website.

== See also ==
- Geosocial networking
- Location-based service
