= Bob Davis (businessman) =

American business executive (born 1956)

Robert J. Davis
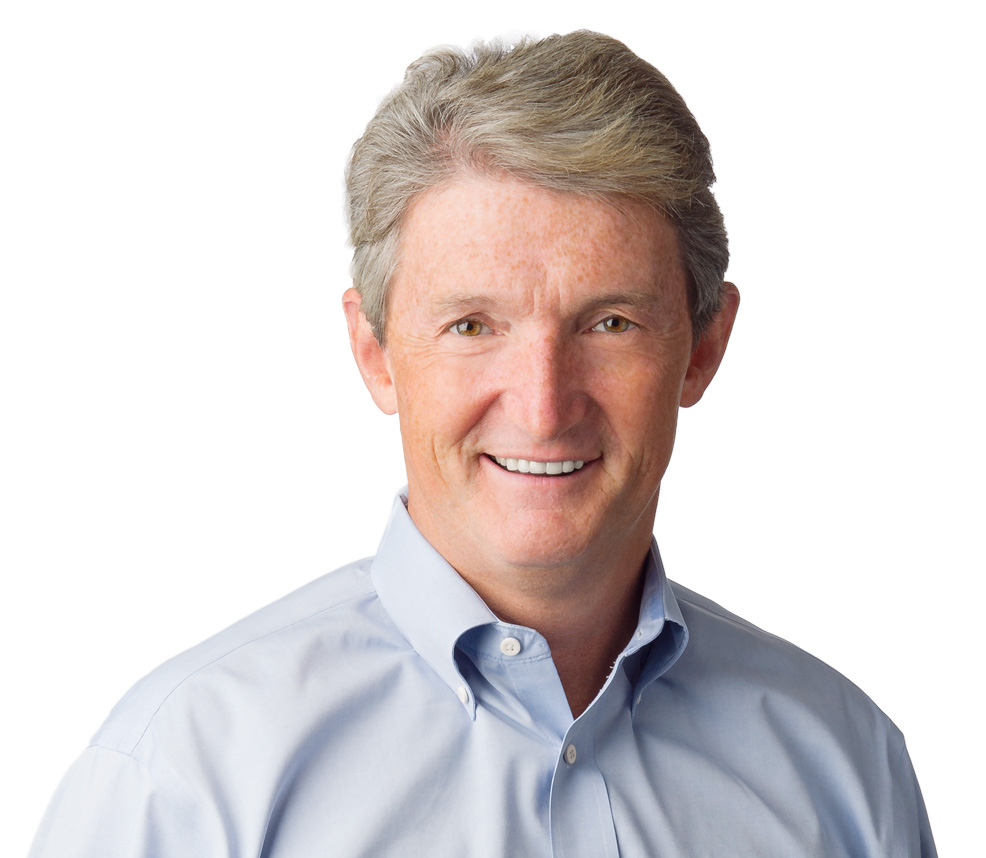
- Bob Davis in 2014
- Born: 1956 (age 69–70); Boston, Massachusetts, U.S.
- Education: Northeastern University, B.S. Business Administration 1979; Babson College, MBA, 1985
- Occupations: General Partner, Highland Capital Partners

Robert J. ("Bob") Davis (born 1956) is a managing partner of Highland Capital Partners. He is the founder and former chief executive officer of Lycos, which he led since its inception and through its acquisition by Terra at the peak of the dot-com bubble.

== Early life and education ==
Davis was born in Dorchester, Massachusetts, in 1956. At the age of 10, Davis sold newspapers at a street corner and sold from mail order catalogs as a teenager.

In 1979, he received a Bachelor of Science degree in Business Administration from Northeastern University, graduating with highest honors. In 1985, he received an MBA from Babson College. In 1999, he received an Honorary Doctorate of Commercial Sciences from Bentley College. He also received an Honorary Doctorate from Northeastern University in 2000.

== Career ==
From January 1982 to January 1993, Davis worked for Wang Laboratories, a computer manufacturer, as director of United States commercial sales and marketing and director of worldwide marketing. From January 1993 to June 1995, Davis served as vice president of sales at Cambex Corporation, a manufacturer of computer-related products.

Since its inception in June 1995, Davis served as the president and CEO of Lycos. In 1996, 9 months after Lycos was founded, he led the company to the fastest initial public offering in history. Lycos was one of the first profitable internet businesses. As CEO of Lycos, he led the company to acquire more than a dozen websites including Wired.com, HotBot, Tripod.com, WhoWhere, Quote.com, and Matchmaker.com. Davis led the company through its acquisition by Terra for $12.5 billion in stock in 2000. After the Terra acquisition, he served as the CEO of Terra Lycos, the combined company.

In 2001, Davis left Terra Lycos to join Highland Capital Partners, a venture capital firm. He has served on the boards of John Hancock Financial, Ticketmaster, Lycos, Lycos Europe, Fastclick, Children's Hospital Boston, and the Rivers School.

== Books ==
In 2001, Davis wrote a book called Speed is Life: Street Smart Lessons from the Front Lines of Business, which was published by Currency, an imprint of Crown Publishing Group. The memoir focused on practical advice for operating a company. Davis donated his proceeds from the book to the National Center for Missing and Exploited Children.
