= Quote (disambiguation) =

A quote (quotation) is the repetition of a statement created by someone else. A quote is indicated with quotation marks.

Quote may also refer to:

== Computing ==
- String literals, computer programming languages' facility for embedding text in the source code
- Quoting in Lisp, the Lisp programming language's notion of quoting
- Quoted-printable, encoding method for data transmission
- Usenet quoting, the conventions used by Usenet and e-mail users when quoting a portion of the original message in a response message.
- Mention (blogging), a means by which a blog post references or links to a user's profile
- Posting style, quoting the original message when a message is replied to in e-mail, Internet forums, or Usenet

== Finance ==
- Financial quote or sales quote, the commercial statement detailing a set of products and services to be purchased in a single transaction by one party from another for a defined price
- Quote.com, a financial website
- Quote notation, representation of certain rational numbers

== Media ==
- Quote... Unquote, panel game on BBC Radio 4.
- Quote (magazine), a Dutch magazine
- Quote, the protagonist of the 2004 platform game Cave Story
- Musical quotation, the practice of directly quoting another work in a new composition

== Places ==
- Quote, Missouri, a ghost town

== See also ==
- Quotation (disambiguation)
