= Bo Peabody =

American entrepreneur

- Born: 1971 (age 54–55)
- Education: Williams College (1994)
- Occupation: Entrepreneur
- Employer: Cornice Ventures
- Known for: Founder of Tripod.com

Bo Peabody (born 1971) is an entrepreneur, venture capitalist and Internet executive who co-founded Tripod.com, one of the earliest dot-coms, in 1992. He is currently the Managing Member of Cornice Ventures, co-founder and Executive Chairman of Seated, and the Executive Chairman of Bella Baby NYC.

== Early life and education ==
Peabody graduated from Williams College in 1994 and the Academy at Charlemont in 1990.

== Career ==
Tripod.com originated in 1992 with two Williams College classmates, Bo Peabody and Brett Hershey, along with Dick Sabot, an economics professor at the school. The company was headquartered in Williamstown, Massachusetts, with Peabody as CEO. Although it would eventually focus on the internet, Tripod also published a magazine, Tools for Life, that was distributed with textbooks, and offered a discount card for students. The company was the eighth-largest site on the Internet when it was sold to Lycos in 1998 for US$58 million in stock. The terms of the sale forced him to hold onto his stock for two years -- while its value increased ten-fold. After the lockup period expired, Peabody sold his shares about two months before the dot-com bubble burst.

Following the sale of Tripod.com, Peabody has gone on to found several other companies. Most notably, he co-founded Village Ventures, a venture capital firm based in Williamstown, Massachusetts.

In 1998, he co-founded Streetmail which became EverydayHealth, the largest competitor to WebMD. Later, he co-founded VoodooVox (2000) and HealthGuru (2004). He was also a venture partner and entrepreneur in residence at Greycroft Partners.

Peabody is also co-owner of Mezze, Inc, a hospitality group consisting of an events business, a boutique hotel, and restaurants in Western Massachusetts.

Peabody is the author of Lucky or Smart, published by Random House.
