= Fansite =

Website created and maintained by a fan of something or someone

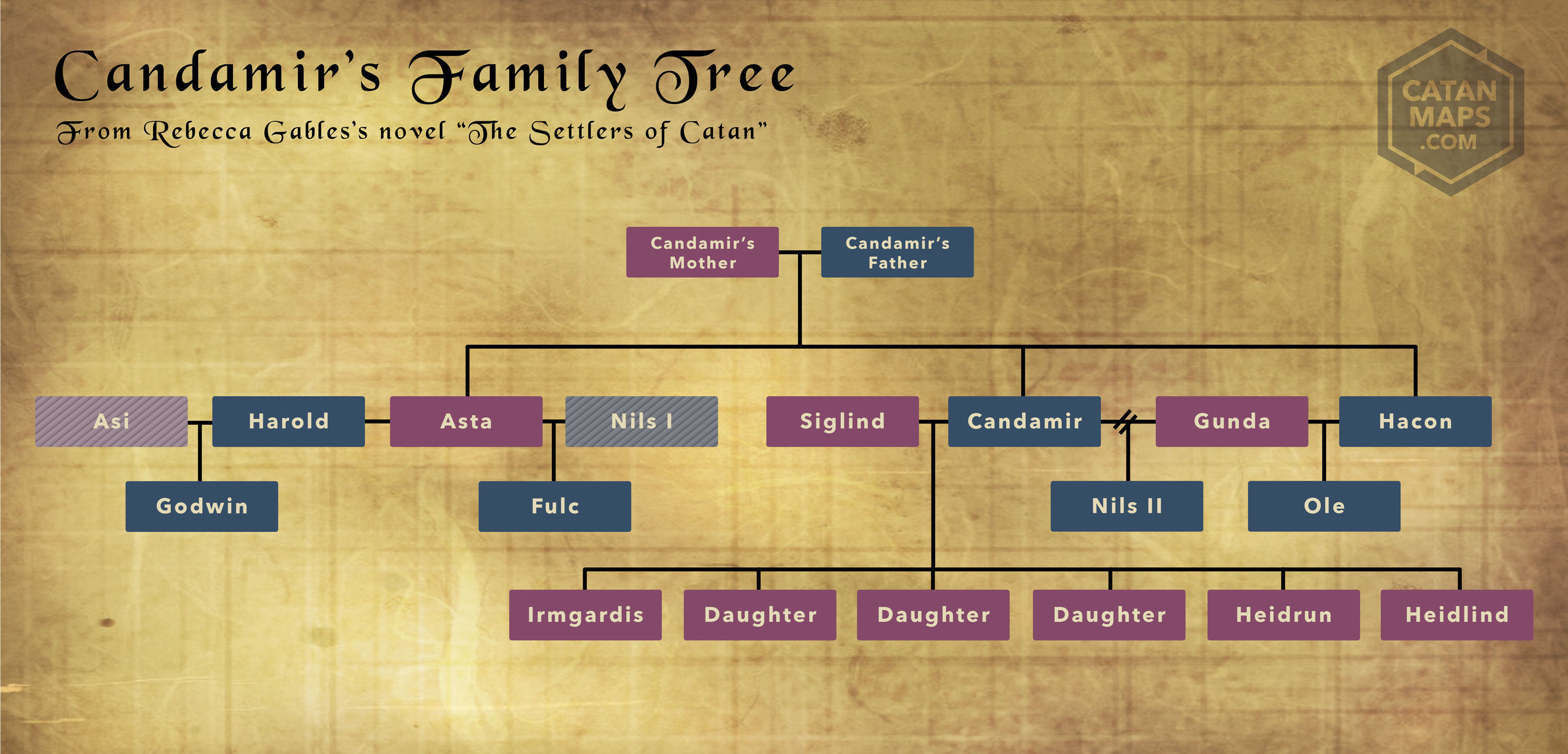
A family tree of fictional characters, from a Catan fansite

A fansite, fan site, fan blog or fan page is a website created and maintained by a fan of or devotee to a celebrity, thing, or particular cultural phenomenon.

Fansites may offer specialized information on the subject (e.g., episode listings, biographies, storyline plots), pictures taken from various sources, the latest news related to their subject, media downloads, links to other, similar fansites, and the chance to talk to other fans via discussion board. They often take the form of a blog, highlighting the latest news regarding the fansite subject. They often include galleries of photos or videos of the subject and are often "affiliates" with other fansites.

Fanlistings are another common type of unofficial fansite, though they are much simpler than general fansites, and are designed simply to list fans of a certain subject who have chosen to submit their names (and sometimes links to their home pages). Many do not contain much information on the subject at all, aside from a small introduction. They are generally made with the thought that visitors will already have knowledge of the subject. However, several are a part of a bigger fansite, used to amplify the fanbase's experience.

== History ==
In the late 1990s, it was a lot more common for an individual to host their own website than it is today. It was not an option at the time to simply use one of the well-developed large-scale general-purpose social media platforms that exist now. Creating a permanent space dedicated to many aspects of a specific fandom often necessitated hosting a fansite, so as to allow room for numerous subtopics and to create dedicated website features which were not possible by using generic forums or chatrooms contemporary to the time.

Although many people did host fansites on their own web servers, it was easier and more common to use free website hosting services such as GeoCities, Tripod, Angelfire, or a smaller consolidated web hosting service offered through an internet service provider. These free website hosts were the home of tens of thousands of fan sites and fan pages. They would offer a subdomain or a subdirectory to upload site contents into, then typically later, popular sites would migrate to an independent domain name rather than keep the name of their free host in the URL. Sometimes these free hosts would offer a web template system to make it easier to start a website, but knowledge of HTML, CSS, and sometimes other backend web technologies, was generally still required.

Hobbyist webmasters launched and built fansites around many topics, such as videogame franchises and entertainment brands (TV series, movies, bands, actors). Nearly all fansites had some type of forum software, such as vBulletin, phpBB, or Invision Power Board so that it was possible for readers of the fansite to engage with each other and communicate.

Independently run fansites peaked in relative popularity around 2005. As the internet matured, many of the previously fragmented communities consolidated under new fledgling tech giants. New website offerings did not require users to understand the technical hurdles required to format and build custom webpages as was previously necessary to have a presence online. In the mid-to-late 2000s, fan communities started to migrate to platforms such as Fandom (launched in 2004 under the names Wikicities, later Wikia), Reddit (launched in 2005), Tumblr (launched in 2007), Facebook groups (launched in 2010), and Discord (launched in 2015). Short public discussions between fans additionally migrated away from fansite forums to places such as YouTube (launched 2005), Twitter (launched 2006), and Pinterest (launched 2010).

Fansites operated and hosted by individuals are still created and persist today, but have become less common. Most traditional needs of fansites are able to be met by the social media platforms and services that replaced them. Additionally, because these services host many different communities, they are able to benefit from consolidated hosting infrastructure costs, access to a large existing user base when new communities are formed, and user familiarity with an existing website interface shared between multiple communities. In contrast, the benefits of creating and maintaining a fansite without help from these modern services include: greater freedom over website functionality, more flexibility to style webpages without conforming to a unified appearance, and independence from centralized services not directly controlled by fan communities. However, these benefits come at the cost of designing and hosting a website on a World Wide Web that is far more complex and competitive than in decades past, when fansites more commonly thrived.

== Motivations ==
A study suggests that unofficial fansites are often built as an alternative to the "hard sell" approach of official fansites that carry commercial messages. A classification system developed by Wann breaks down eight motives of fandom. These motives, particularly those related to group affiliation and self-esteem, are a driving factor in the creation of unofficial fan sites.

Satisfying the social psychology needs of group affiliation and self-esteem by visiting fansites, and, in particular, participating in the community aspects of fansites, appear to serve to increase fan behavior.

Research on interpersonal attraction indicates that people generally prefer to socialize with those who are similar to them. For example, sports fans fulfill this need by attending sporting events in person. In the online world, fans fulfill this need by building or participating in online fansites.

Many fans prefer to visit unofficial fansites for fan-related services, but still prefer an official fansite as the primary source for accurate information since it affords the closest affiliation with the target itself.

== See also ==
- Fan art
- Fan club
- Fandom
- Fan fiction
- Fan mail
- Fan wiki
