= Lycos Europe =

Coordinates: 51.9061°N 8.3875°E

The Lycos logo

Lycos Europe was a pan-European network of websites, offering services including communication tools, online communities, web search, e-commerce, web hosting, homepage building and Internet access. It was an independent corporation, sharing no corporate structure with Lycos, Inc. (USA) other than the licensed use of their name in Europe. On 26 November 2008, Lycos Europe announced that it was to shut down and sell its remaining assets.

== History ==
Lycos Europe was established in May 1997, as a joint-venture between the German media corporation Bertelsmann and Lycos, Inc.; in order to create localised Web portals in multiple European countries. Bertelsmann provided an initial $10 million investment to start the joint venture, with Lycos providing the technology. the joint-venture agreement was expanded to include provision of content from Bertelsmann's European media assets, while Bertelsmann was able to promote its various e-commerce offerings to Lycos Europe's 19m users.

In March 2000, Lycos Europe raised €612 million in an initial public offering Frankfurt Stock Exchange's Neuer Markt (New Market), priced at a valuation of €5.5 billion.

In April 2000, Terra (Internet multinational company owned by Telefónica acquired Lycos, Inc., in a stock swap valued at US$12.5 billion. The merged company started operating under the name "Terra Lycos". As part of the deal Bertelsmann, in exchange for keeping the control over Lycos Europe, agreed to spend US$1 billion worth in advertising at Terra Lycos through a five-year period. That spending was crucial for Terra to survive the times of the Internet crash, when several Latin American-based Internet companies, like Quepasa, filing for bankruptcy or being taken over by bigger companies.. The merged company operated under the name "Terra Lycos".

=== Make Love Not Spam ===
In November 2004, Lycos Europe introduced a Microsoft Windows and Mac OS screensaver program called Make Love Not Spam. It was introduced as both marketing for the then-new Lycos email service Spray Mail, and as a way for users to fight spam in a collective manner.

The program worked using users' computers to perform a DDOS attack on the web servers of known spammers. The computers worked in the same way as a botnet except the users were aware of the software and were able to decide if they wished to be involved in the scheme.

On the December 21, 2004 Lycos Europe stopped distributing the program whilst simultaneously 'turning off' the programs on computers that had downloaded it. The decision was made under heavy criticism from Internet and security experts. It is also believed Lycos was subject to large scale counterattacks believed to be from spammers in retaliation. The distribution website was replaced with the words "Stay Tuned".

=== The Winding up of Lycos Europe ===
In November 2008, Lycos Europe announced that shareholders had called for its liquidation. At the time Terra owned 32% of the company and Bertelsmann 20%. Over the following months, it sold as many of its assets as possible and liquidated. Sold assets included the sale of the Danish portal Jubii, the Lycos Chat (which at the time was both the Lycos & Yahoo Chat in Europe) was transferred to a new operator on March 9, 2009, and for a short while rebranded as the Noesis Chat. The Lycos Chat now forms part of Lycos, Inc. (USA) collection of sites, Love@Lycos was sold to a Swedish company. Lycos Europe sold further businesses: the news search Paperball was taken over by Paperball GmbH, Munich. The search engine Fireball now belongs to Ambrosia AG, Zug (Switzerland). Trademark and domains of the French Email-Service Caramail were taken over by United Internet AG, Montabaur. Conversis hosting GmbH continues the free hosting service MultiMania. Since liquidation, Lycos Inc withdrew the right for Lycos Europe to use their name and therefore, Lycos Europe are still partially trading under the name Jubii Europe.
