= ShopFully =

Italian tech company

Shopfully
- Industry: Advertising, Internet
- Founder: Alessandro Palmieri and Stefano Portu
- Headquarters: Milan, Italy

Shopfully is a tech company that connects millions of shoppers with local stores around them. The company specializes in the digital strategies that encourage consumers to visit physical stores, thereby increasing foot traffic.

Shopfully manages four websites and apps aimed for shopping in local store — DoveConviene, Tiendeo, PromoQui and VolantinoFacile. With over 45 million users globally, these platforms provide up-to-date information on the latest offers and services from retailers and brands.

== History ==
DoveConviene, a consumer marketplace, was founded by Alessandro Palmieri and Stefano Portu in 2012, in Italy. In 2013, DoveConviene raised 3.5 million euro in A funding by Xyence, followed by a 5.2 million euro investment in 2014 by investment round B with the venture capital companies 360 Capital Partners and Merifin Capital. In 2015, the company received €10 million in funding from Highland Capital Partners Europe. In 2017, the company launched in Australia as Shopfully and in July, it acquired Commonsense, a digital technology provider for retail, to improve tech platform development.

In 2019, the company launched Shopfully Engage, the mobile advertising platform to generate visits to physical stores through standard media formats, and HI! (standing for Hyperlocal Intelligence) the hyperlocal marketing platform based on artificial intelligence, that allows retailers and brands to engage with consumers throughout the purchasing process, from online research to in-store shopping. DoveConviene was also renamed as Shopfully that year to reflect the wider scope both in terms of geographies and product offering.

In 2020, Shopfully acquired VolantinoFacile and PromoQui, two info-commerce marketplaces.

In 2022, Shopfully completed its third acquisition with the Spanish company Tiendeo. The operation created a combined group with teams in 12 countries, a network of 45 million active users, and over 400 partners among major retailers and brands globally. Between 2022 and 2023, Tiendeo started operating as Shopfully in France, Iberia, South Africa and LATAM.

In 2023, Shopfully partnered with MEDIA Central Group to become Europe's leading drive-to-store marketing platform for major retailers and brands.
