= Chase Masterson =

American actress and singer (born 1963)

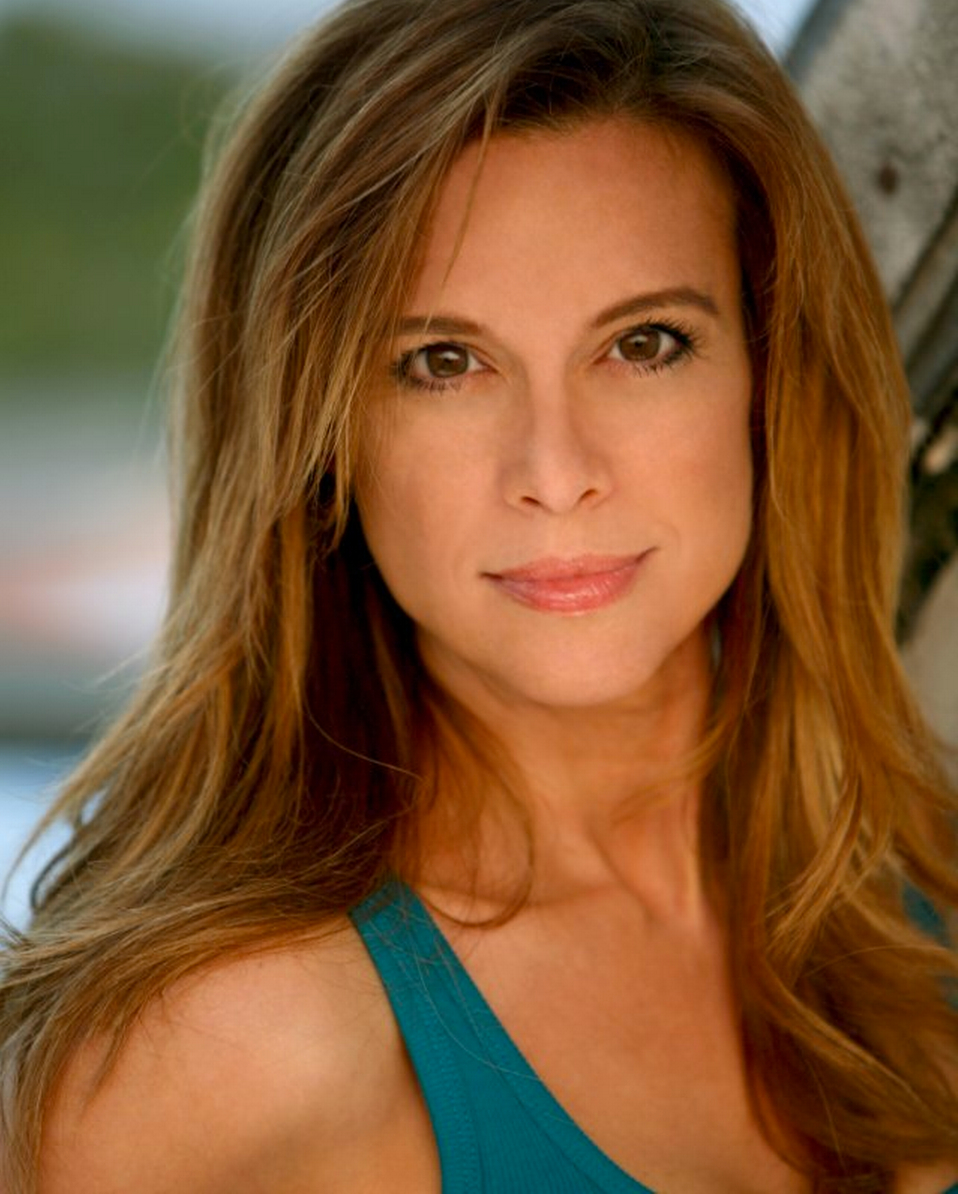
- Chase Masterson c. 2012
- Born: Christianne Carafano; February 26, 1963 (age 63); Colorado Springs, Colorado, U.S.
- Education: University of Texas at Austin (BFA)
- Occupations: Actress; singer
- Known for: Star Trek: Deep Space Nine; Yesterday Was a Lie; Robotech: The Shadow Chronicles
- Musical career
- Genres: Jazz; pop
- Instrument: Vocals
- Years active: 1983–present
- Labels: La-La Land, Helicon Arts Cooperative

Chase Masterson (born Christianne Carafano on February 26, 1963) is an American actress, singer and producer best known for her role as Leeta on Star Trek: Deep Space Nine. She has appeared in the TV shows General Hospital, Sliders, and ER and voiced characters in several animated films. As a singer, she has released several albums. In 2008, Masterson won the Best Feature Film Producer award at the LA Femme Film Festival for the film Yesterday Was a Lie, in which she also acted. In 2013, Masterson co-founded the Pop Culture Hero Coalition to speak out against bullying, racism, misogyny, homophobia and other forms of hate.

== Early life ==
Masterson was born Christianne Carafano in Colorado Springs, Colorado. As her father was in the Army, she grew up in several places, among them West Haven, Connecticut and three years in Germany. Her family settled in El Paso, Texas when she was in the sixth grade. Masterson graduated from the University of Texas and has one child.

== Career ==
=== Acting ===
Masterson's first major role came in 1994 as Ivy Lief on General Hospital. She then spent five years portraying the Bajoran Dabo girl Leeta on Star Trek: Deep Space Nine from 1995 to 1999. Her prominent feature film roles include starring as a sultry singer in James Kerwin's sci-fi film noir Yesterday Was a Lie, which she also produced, and voicing Janice Em in the animated film Robotech: The Shadow Chronicles. Her television guest-starring roles include ER and Sliders; in the latter, her role was that of Kelly Welles, the sister of Wade Welles.

Masterson hosted an Entertainment Tonight-style news program for the Sci-Fi Channel in the 1990s called Sci-Fi Entertainment and an Internet-based radio talk show for the website The Fandom in 2004–2005.

Since 2010, Masterson has reprised her role as Leeta from Deep Space Nine, both in hologram form and in her "mirror universe" guise, in Cryptic Studios' Star Trek Online. After Masterson appeared in two Doctor Who audio adventures from Big Finish Productions, it was announced on October 19, 2012, that she would star in her own spin-off series, Vienna, as "impossibly glamorous bounty hunter" Vienna Salvatori.

Masterson is voicing the title character "Auto" in monochrom's science fiction comedy film Je Suis Auto (release 2024). The film is a farcical comedy that deals with issues such as AI, politics of labor, and tech culture.

=== Singer and live performer ===
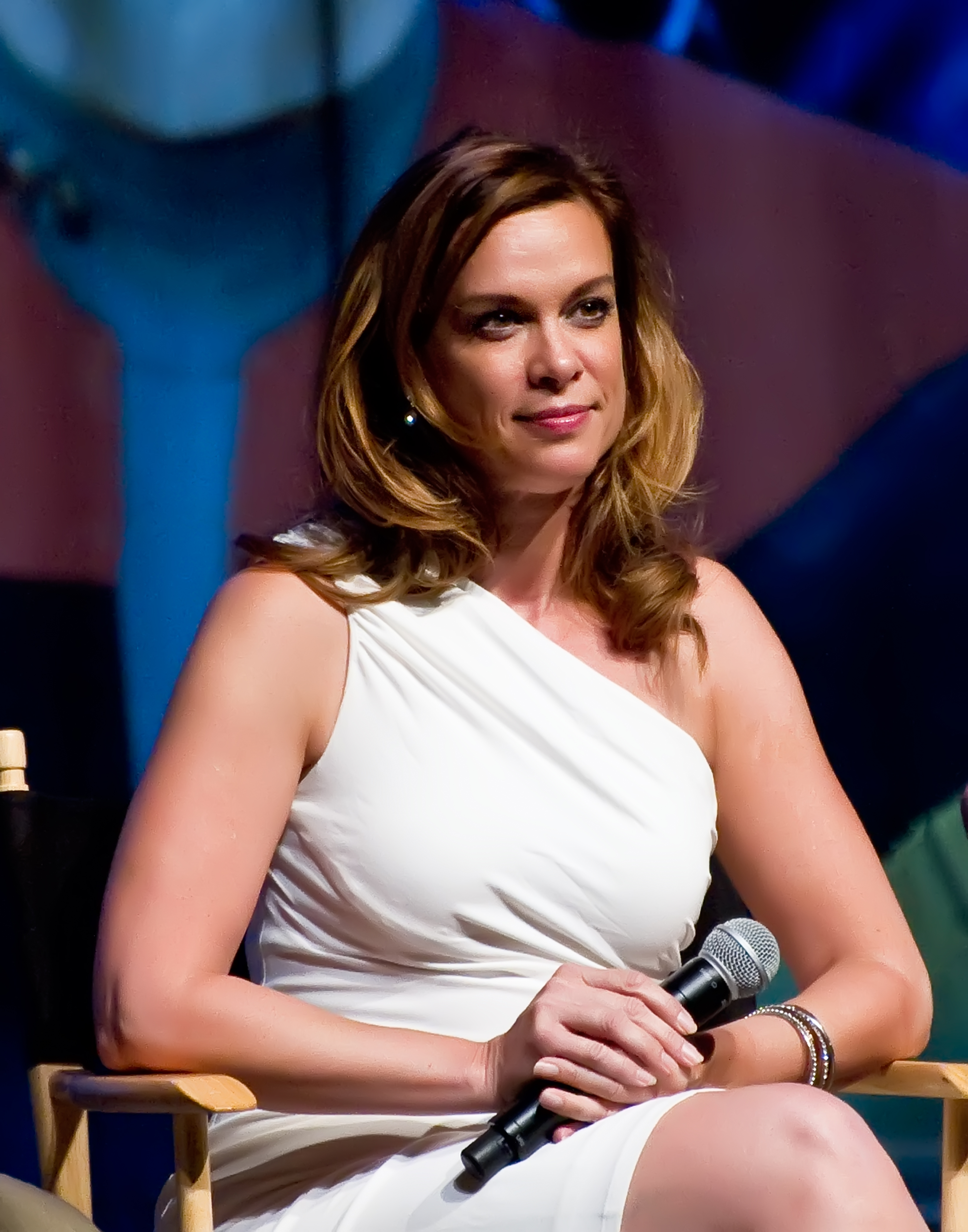
Masterson at the Star Trek Convention, Las Vegas in 2011

Masterson has released two commercial records: 2011's Yesterday Was a Lie and 2012's Burned With Desire. In addition, she has released several independent jazz CDs: Thrill of the Chase, whose title is a play on her stage name, the follow-up EP AD ASTRA! (Latin for To the Stars!), the limited edition Crystal Anniversary: Songs from the Holosuite in honor of Star Trek: Deep Space Nine's fifteenth anniversary, and the "greatest hits" compilation Jazz Cocktail.

Masterson was special guest star at the 20th anniversary edition of cocktail robot festival Roboexotica in Vienna and performed a live jazz set for "robots and humans".

=== Film producer ===
Masterson was named Best Feature Film Producer of 2008 by the LA Femme Film Festival for her work as producer of the mystery/drama Yesterday Was a Lie.

=== Advocacy ===
In 2013, Masterson, who experienced bullying herself while in school, co-founded the Pop Culture Hero Coalition, a non-profit organization speaking out against "bullying, racism, misogyny, cyber-bullying, LGBT-bullying, and other forms of hate."

== Public image ==
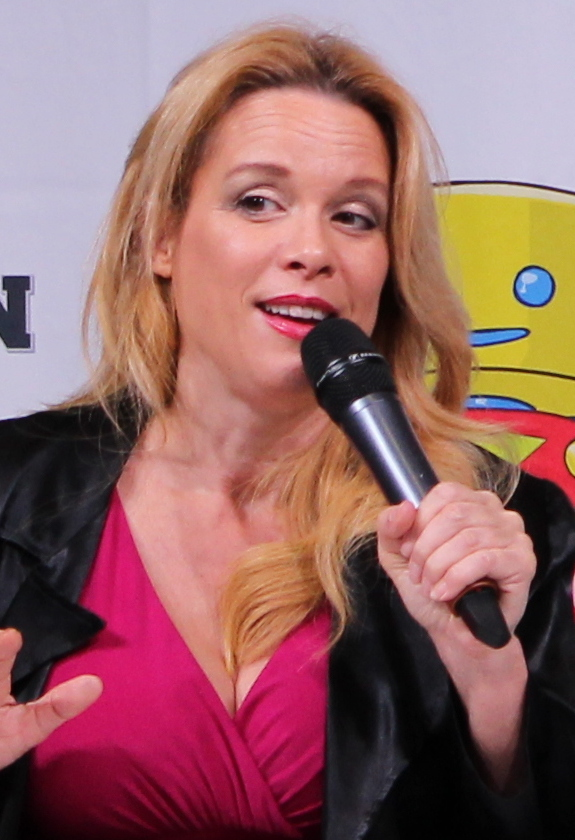
Masterson at the Florida Supercon in 2016

In 2004, as a result of her genre work, Masterson was named one of the world's "50 Sexiest Women" by the men's magazine Femme Fatales, and the "Favorite Science Fiction Actress on Television" in a TV Guide reader's poll. In December 2009, AOL named her one of the "Ten Sexiest Aliens on TV", reporting that Masterson is "regularly voted the most popular guest at Star Trek conventions."

== Lawsuit against Matchmaker.com ==
Following a series of stalking incidents instigated by a man in Berlin, Masterson – under her birth name of Christianne Carafano – was the petitioner in Carafano v. Metrosplash.com, an online dating service, formerly Matchmaker.com, on which the man had created a fictitious dating profile that contained Masterson's home address, telephone number, four photographs of her, and a description of her that characterized her as licentious. As a result, she received a series of unwanted communications, including obscene telephone calls. When the matter was brought to the attention of Matchmaker.com they removed the profile from the site. Masterson then sued Matchmaker.com for defamation, invasion of privacy, misappropriation of the right of publicity and negligence. The United States Court of Appeals for the Ninth Circuit ruled against Masterson, deciding the man who created the profile was responsible for it, and not Matchmaker.com. The court cited Communications Decency Act, which states that "No provider or user of an interactive computer service shall be treated as the publisher or speaker of any information provided by another information content provider."

== Discography ==
- Yesterday Was a Lie (2011)
- "Burned with Desire" (2012)

== Filmography ==
Television
Year	Title	Role	Notes
1994	General Hospital	Ivy Lief	Unknown episodes
1995–1999	Star Trek: Deep Space Nine	Leeta	Recurring character; 17 episodes
1995	ER	Mrs. Phillips	1 episode, "Hell and High Water"
1995	Live Shot	Sheila Rydell	3 episodes
1996	Sliders	Kelly Welles	1 episode
1999	Acapulco H.E.A.T.	Gwen	1 episode
2002	Presidio Med	Caroline Franklin	1 episode
2015	The Flash	Sherry	1 episode
2019	Pandora	Computer (Voice)	9 episodes

Films
Year	Title	Role	Notes
1984	Songwriter	Girl in Bed	credited as Christie Carafano
1985	Confessions of a Serial Killer	Prostitute	credited as Christie Carafano
1993	Robin Hood: Men in Tights	Giggling Court Lady	
1995	Digital Man	Susie	
1997	Ballerina Finale	Lori	
1998	Sometimes They Come Back... for More	Major Callie O'Grady	
1999	Sammyville	Miranda Clark	
2000	The Specials	Moira Murphy	
2001	Lightning: Fire from the Sky	Anna	
2002	Terminal Invasion	Cathy Garrett	
2004	Comic Book: The Movie	Herself	
2004	Creature Unknown	Kat	
2005	Take Out	Nicole Blu	
2006	Manticore	Ashley Pierce	
2006	Chastity	Madam	
2007	Through Your Eyes	Herself	
2008	Yesterday Was a Lie	Singer	
2008	Star Trek: Of Gods and Men	Xela	
2011	The Truth Is Out There	Herself	
2013	The Search for Simon	The Publisher	
2013	R.U.R.: Genesis	Sulla	
2016	Star Trek: Captain Pike	Lieutenant Susan Kelly	
2019	Manipulated	Karen Jones	
2020	Unbelievable!!!!!	Captain Connie Garrison / Natasha	
2021	Skipping Stones	Mrs. McDowell	
2024	Hacking at Leaves	Interviewee / Two Anonymous Medical Professionals	
2024	Je Suis Auto	Auto	
TBA	Tempest: An Angels Wrath	Dr. Angel Conch	
TBA	The Inspector Chronicles	Annabelle Wagner	Announced – in development

Voice roles
Year	Title	Role
2007	Robotech: The Shadow Chronicles	Janice (animated feature film)
2009	Fist of the North Star: The Shin Saga	Mamiya (animated direct-to-video movie)
2009–2010	Starship Farragut – The Animated Episodes	Carmen Renata / Sheila Johnson / Medical Assistant
2010	Star Trek Online	Leeta / Empress Leeta (MMORPG)
2011	Lun Lun the Flower Girl	Various Characters (anime TV movie)
2011	Lun Lun the Flower Girl 2	Various Characters (anime TV movie)
2011	Fist of the North Star: The Ray Saga	Mamiya (animated direct-to-video movie)
2011	Fist of the North Star: The Souther Saga	Mamiya (animated direct-to-video movie)
2011	Fist of the North Star: The Toki Saga	Mamiya (animated direct-to-video movie)
2011	Starzinger	Queen Lacet (anime TV series)
2012	Doctor Who: The Shadow Heart	Vienna Salvatori (audio drama)
2012	Doctor Who: Night of the Stormcrow	Peggy Brooks (audio drama)
2013–2017	Vienna	Vienna Salvatori (audio drama series)
2014–2015	Survivors	Maddie Price (audio drama)
2015	The Worlds of Big Finish	Vienna Salvatori (audio drama)
2021	Master!	Vienna Salvatori (audio drama)
2023	Star Trek: Lower Decks	Leeta (voice)
