= Telco consumer email =

Email services bundled with Internet access

Telco consumer email refers to email services provided by telecommunications companies (telcos), Internet service providers (ISPs), and carriers to their customers. Traditionally, these services were integral to Internet offerings, allowing users to send, receive, and store electronic messages tied to their Internet subscriptions.

== Launch and functions ==
In the early 1990s, as Internet connectivity became more widespread, telcos and ISPs began offering email services to their subscribers. These services provided users with unique email addresses associated with the provider's domain, facilitating electronic communication. Functions typically included basic email composition, sending and receiving capabilities, address book management, and limited storage space. The email services were accessed through webmail interfaces or configured into email client applications.

== Industry insights and historical trends ==
The peak of telco consumer email can be traced back to the early 2000s, when web-based email providers such as Hotmail, Yahoo Mail, and later Gmail started gaining traction. These services offered greater storage, better spam filtering, and better portability compared to ISP-provided email, which was tied to specific provider services.

By the mid-2010s, telcos and ISPs began deprecating or outsourcing their email services. For instance, in 2015, Google discontinued its support for its whitelabel ISP email service, prompting providers such as Virgin Media to develop their own in-house solutions.

These developments have contributed to the consolidation of consumer email services to major providers such as Google (Gmail), Microsoft (Hotmail and Outlook.com), and Yahoo, as telcos and ISPs move away from maintaining their own email infrastructures. Several major ISPs and telecommunications companies have discontinued or restructured their email services.

In 2015, Verizon acquired AOL and gradually phased out support for legacy email platforms. The service later sold to Yahoo in 2021 and then in 2025 AOL was sold again to Bending Spoons.

In 2017, Vodafone New Zealand shut down its email service, impacting approximately 250,000 customers across several domains such as ihug.co.nz, paradise.net.nz, and clear.net.nz. The decision was attributed to the service's inability to keep up with advancements in email technology, leading many customers to seek alternative providers.

By 2020, Frontier Communications exited the email service business, requiring customers to migrate to third-party providers.

In 2023, Vodafone Italia announced it would close its email service by June. In 2024, Amiva became one of the latest of many companies to discontinue its email service.

== Market decline ==
The decline of telco consumer email has been driven by several factors, including increased competition from free alternatives and the high cost of maintaining legacy email infrastructure. Most telco-operated email services remain on-premises, making them costly to sustain as the user base contracts. Some telcos have opted to outsource their email services to white-label providers to reduce operational expenses. Many of these outsourcing agreements go unnoticed as they do not require any changes from the customer and are confidential agreements with market players such as Atmail, Synacor (Zimbra), Synchronoss (now Openwave), and Open X-Change.

Examples include:

- Telus (Canada) migrated its email service to Google in 2021
- Cox Communications (USA) transitioned its email users to Yahoo Mail
- Singtel (Singapore) migrated to Atmail in 2019.
- Rogers Communications (Canada) also moved its email service to Yahoo.
- British Telecom (UK) migrated away from Yahoo to Synchronoss
- In 2017, Spark (New Zealand) migrated away from Yahoo to SMX

== Challenges in service discontinuation ==
Discontinuing telco email services presents several challenges. Fixed-line service providers often hesitate to shut down email services due to potential customer churn and brand reputation concerns. In some jurisdictions, regulations require telcos to maintain email services for existing customers. In addition, for customers who rely on their telco-provided email as their primary digital identity.

=== Security and operational risks ===
As telco email services decline, cybersecurity risks increase due to reduced investment in updates and security patches. Out-of-date infrastructure becomes vulnerable to cyber threats, including spam, malware, and ransomware. AI-driven phishing attacks have also intensified global email security concerns. A notable example occurred when a ransomware attack disrupted Buckeye Broadband’s email services in 2022.

In response to these evolving threats, organizations are recognizing the need to update their email security measures. According to recent research, 93% of organizations plan to improve email security, yet many face significant implementation challenges, particularly with protocols such as DMARC.

=== Market consolidation and vendor challenges ===
The telecommunications email market has contracted over the years, leading to vendor consolidation, workforce reductions, and liquidations.

In 2017, Proofpoint acquired Cloudmark, an email security company, for $110 million. In the following years, Cloudmark has seen a decline in new customers and declining license renewal rates, raising concerns about its long-term viability.

In 2020 and 2024, Open-Xchange, a provider of white-label email solutions, reduced its workforce due to declining demand.

In 2023, Synchronoss Technologies divested Openwave messaging to cut costs by approximately $15 million annually.

In 2023, Cyren, a provider of email anti-abuse solutions, announced its liquidation. In the same year, Zimbra, once a growing email provider, showed signs of stagnation, reflecting broader market conditions.

In 2024, Hornet Security acquired Vade and then in 2025 Proofpoint acquired Hornet.

In 2026, AWS announced end of life for WorkMail

These changes highlight the challenges faced by companies in the shrinking telecommunications email sector.

== Demographics and future ==
With most providers no longer offering new email account registrations and the estimated average age of a subscriber being over 60 years old, telco email services will become obsolete within the next two decades. Market saturation has been reached, with new telcos, ISPs, and even mobile virtual network operators (MVNOs) choosing not to include email services, With limited growth potential, vendors can only expand by taking market share from competitors, making the sector a "red ocean" with fierce competition and minimal opportunities.

As a result, a growing number of telcos are opting to divest their email operations. This is in alignment with other service divestments such as the Yellow Pages, pay phones, and, as of 2024, fixed lines and even cellular towers.

== Telco and ISP divestments or shutdowns ==
Telco and ISP divestments or shutdowns (68 entries as of October 2026)
Company	Country	Announced change (exit or divestment)	Domains offered	Technology	Status
BTC (Bahamas Telecommunications Company)	Bahamas	September 2026	@batelnet.bs	Zimbra	Shutdown scheduled; outbound mail disabled 30 November 2026, inbound disabled 15 December 2026, all access ends 31 December 2026
Virgin Media O2	United Kingdom	September 2026	@virginmedia.com @ntlworld.com @blueyonder.co.uk @virgin.net	Atmail	Divested service to Junara.
Telecom Argentina (Fibertel)	Argentina	September 2026	@fibertel.com.ar @lanet.com.ar @jetband.com.ar @flash.com.ar @citynet.net.ar	Zimbra	Email service to be discontinued 1 October 2026, announced on the official webmail sign-in page.
Turkcell	Turkey	August 2026	@yaani.com	N/A	YaaniMail service closing 31 October 2026; data inaccessible after 1 December 2026.
TDS Telecom	USA	July 2026	@tds.net	Zimbra	Email service transferred to Everymail
BCREMC	USA	June 2026	@bcremc.net	N/A	Email service discontinued on June 10, 2026.
EONI (Eastern Oregon Net, Inc.)	USA	May 2026	@eoni.com	N/A	Email service shutting down on May 1, 2026. Paid 6-month extension available until November 2026.
Flow	Cayman	May 2026	@candw.ky	N/A	Service shutdown announced. Shutdown scheduled for August 2026
Vocus	Australia	May 2026	Main domains @iprimus.com.au - @dodo.com.au - @commander.net.au - @amnet.net.au - @hotkey.net.au - @sctelco.net.au - @primusonline.com.au Other domains arach.net.au, onestream.com.au, aanet.com.au, m2data.com.au, eftel.net.au, dragnet.com.au, bold.net.au, datafast.net.au, southcom.com.au, labyrinth.net.au, clubtelco.com, vision.net.au, keypoint.com.au, gotalk.net.au, flatrate.net.au, rslcom.net.au	Roundcube + Dovecot +Exim	Email service transferred to 'The Messaging Company'
Cablenet	Cyprus	July 2026	@cablenet.com.cy	N/A	Shutdown announced; email service to be discontinued on 31 December 2026, with mailbox data permanently deleted after 31 March 2027
Cedar Networks (Ting)	USA	March 2026	@mydurango.net	N/A	Legacy email service permanently discontinued on 12 March 2026 following Ting's 2019 acquisition of Cedar Networks
Quadro	Canada	April 2026	@quadro.net	Roundcube	Shutdown announced in April 2026 with service termination scheduled for November 2026
Metronet	USA	April 2026	@mymetronet.net cinergymetro.net deskmedia.com cannon.net (and mail.cannon.net) dmbroadband.com gofast.am smig.net mhtele.com firstmileusa.com gotown.net firesmile.net	Zimbra	Shutdown announced in April 2026 with final shutdown and email account deletion expected 21 June 2026
MTC	Namibia	April 2026	@mtcmobile.com.na	Zimbra	Service terminated 25th April 2026
Sparklight (formerly Cable One)	USA	March 2026	@nova1net.com	N/A	Nova1Net email service shutting down on March 3, 2026. Accounts and data will be permanently deleted.
Southern Phone	Australia	February 2026	@southernphone.net.au	Atmail Cloud	Service terminated April 2026
Ptera a Ziply Fiber Company	USA	February 2026	@ptera.net	Magic Mail	Shutdown announced for 1st May.
Tuckersmith Communications Co-operative (TCC)	Canada	January 2026	@tcc.on.ca @ezlink.on.ca @ezlink.ca	N/A	EZLINK domains shut down Jan 1, 2026. TCC domains fully decommissioned by late 2026.
Evertek	USA	January 2026	@evertek.net @netllc.net	Zimbra	Announced shutdown in Jan 2026 with final service end Sept 15 2026
Plala by NTT Docomo	Japan	November 2025	@plala.or.jp @***.plala.or.jp	N/A	Email service set to be terminated on March 31, 2027. Current users will be provided a NTT Docomo OCN mail, but their existing mail will not be migrated.
Manx	Isle of Man	October 2025	@manx.net @isleofman.com @isleofman.org	Atmail	Divested service to Junara.
MasOrange	Spain	September 2025	@orange.es @amena.com @ctv.es @ya.com @wanadoo.es @jet.es @wanadoadsl.net @mixmail.com @jazzfree.com @autocity.com @eremas.com @eremas.net @rincodelvago.com @chueca.com @orangemail.es @orrangecorreo.es @telepolis.com	N/A	Shutdown of email service.
Exemail by Exetel (Parent company Superloop)	Australia	September 2025	@exemail.com.au	Atmail	Email service transferred to The Messaging Company as a paid service.
Talk Talk	United Kingdom	July 2025	@talktalk.net @lineone.net @tiscali.co.uk @tinyworld.co.uk @pipex.com	Open Xchange	Email services transferred to Everymail as a paid service.
NOS	Portugal	July 2025	@clix.pt @kanguru.pt @mail.pt @oniduo.pt @oninetspeed.pt @oninet.pt @mail.optimus.pt	N/A	Email service divested to Sooma, effective 16 July 2025. NOS official customer notice
Comcast	USA	June 2025	@comcast.net	Yahoo	Migration from legacy system to Yahoo for all comcast.net email customers
AT&T	USA	June 2025	@att.net @currently.com @worldnet.att.net @sbcglobal.net @bellsouth.net @pacbell.net @prodigy.net @swbell.net @ameritech.net @snet.net @flash.net @wans.net @nvbell.net	Yahoo	Fully migrated to Yahoo services in late 2025; Postmaster @ Yahoo & AOL — Changes to AT&T Mail Routing
Lumos	USA	May 2025	@lumos.net @northstate.net @ntelos.net	carrierzone	Lumos was sold to T-Mobile in April 2025 and the email subscribers were moved to Advernology
PlusNet	United Kingdom	May 2025	@plus.net		Migration to the Greenby platform is actively ongoing. The final discontinuation of free email service is set for October 31, 2025, when all associated accounts and data will be deleted unless subscribed to the paid service.
B2B2C (formally known as AEI)	Canada	May 2025	@b2b2c.ca	Horde	Announced in May 2025 with closure on 30 November 2025
goo mail by NTT Docomo	Japan	April 2025	@goo.jp	N/A	The service set to be terminated on February 25, 2026. Current users are being asked to move to an alternative service on their own (Gmail or NTT Docomo OCN is suggested).
Tele2	Germany	January 2025	@telta.de	N/A	Shutdown of email service.
TRUE Corporation	Thailand	December 2024	@truemail.co.th @trueinternet.co.th	N/A	Shutdown of email service.
Tele2	Netherlands	September 2024	@tele2.se @comhem.se	N/A	Email service shut down
UPC	Poland	September 2024	upcpoczta.pl chello.pl	N/A	Email service shutdown
Flow	Sint Maarten	August 2024	@caribserve.net	N/A	Email service discontinued on August 31, 2024.
DIGI Hungary	Hungary	August 2024	@digikabel.hu, @invitel.hu, @fibermail.hu, @vnet.hu, @hdsnet.hu, @globonet.hu, @euroweb.hu, @eol.hu, @dunaweb.hu, @anet.hu, @profinter.hu and @kulturnet.hu.	N/A	Email service shut down
HK Cable	Hong Kong	July 2024		N/A	Shutdown of email service.
Cox	USA	June 2024	@cox.net	Yahoo	Transitioned email service to Yahoo Mail. Customers can continue using their cox.net email addresses on Yahoo Mail platform.
Virgin Ireland	Ireland	May 2024	@virgin.net	N/A	Announced shutdown. Exact month not specified in source.
Frontier	USA	March 2024		Yahoo	Transitioned email services to Yahoo.
Telenor (formerly Bredbandsbolaget)	Sweden	November 2023	@bredband.net @bredbandsbolaget.se	N/A	Email accounts permanently deleted 15 November 2023. SweClockers: Telenor släcker ned sin mailtjänst
TPG Telecom	Australia	September 2023	@iinet.net.au @internode.net.au @tpg.com.au @westnet.com.au + many more	Atmail	Service was divested to "The Messaging Company"
Vodafone	Italy	June 2023	@teletu.it @vodafone.it	N/A	Shutdown of email service.
Email.it SRL	Italy	December 2022	@email.it		Divested service to Fjordmail Technologies
Gtel	USA	December 2022	@gtel.net @valstar.net	N/A	Discontinued email service in 2022.
Deutsche Telekom	Germany	October 2022	@De-Mail	N/A	Shutdown of email service.
OTE	Greece	September 2022	@otenet.gr	N/A	Shutdown of email service.
Turkish Telecom	Turkey	June 2022	@TTmail	N/A	Shutdown of email service.
Movistar (Telefónica)	Argentina	July 2021	@speedy.com.ar @infovia.com.ar @satlink.com @cpsarg.com @advancedsl.com.ar @overnet.com.ar	N/A	Email accounts discontinued 1 July 2021, announced on the company's official account. Movistar Argentina official announcement (X/Twitter) Movistar Argentina official user forum discussion
Vodafone Hungary	Hungary	May 2021	@upcmail.hu, @chello.hu, @monornet.hu, @upctelekom.hu	N/A	Shut down email service
Slovak Telekom	Slovakia	December 2020	@ba.telekom.sk @bb.telekom.sk @ke.telekom.sk.stonline.sk @mail.t-com.sk @t-zones.sk @posta.telekom.sk regional telekom.sk	N/A	Shutdown of the email service. Telekom cancels free e-mail services – SK-NIC
Telia	Norway	July 2020	@getmail.no	Webmail	Divested to Recurrent AS
East of Eden	South Africa	June 2020	@webmail.co.za	Webmail	Acquired by Inbox.com
Telus	Canada	March 2020	@telus.net @telusplanet.net	Google	Service transitioned to Google infrastructure, with migration running through 2020–2021. New accounts still offered, though the ownership status of customer data is unclear.
Suomi24	Finland	January 2020	@Suomi24	N/A	Divested to Mailbox.org. Users asked to pay after 3 months.
Play	Poland	December 2019	@play.pl	N/A	Shutdown of email service.
Vodafone	Greece	January 2019	@hol.gr	N/A	Shutdown of email service.
GO	Malta	July 2018	@maltanet.net @go.net.mt	N/A	GO e-mail users angry at move to close down service
Global Connect	Norway	February 2018	@Mailia.no	N/A	Divested to Fjordmail Technologies
Vodafone	New Zealand	November 2017	@vodafone.co.nz @vodafone.net.nz @ihug.co.nz @wave.co.nz @quik.co.nz @pcconnect.co.nz @paradise.net.nz @clear.net.nz @es.co.nz	N/A	Shutdown of email service.
Verizon	USA	June 2017	@verizon.net	AOL	Fully divested to AOL. Final migration of Verizon email addresses to AOL. Word to the Wise
Orange (EE)	United Kingdom	May 2017	@orange.net @orangehome.co.uk @wanadoo.co.uk @freeserve.co.uk	N/A	Shutdown of email service, announced to customers in February 2017 and closed 31 May 2017. The Guardian: Freeserve, Wanadoo and Orange email addresses are no more
Orange	France	January 2016	@Voila.fr	N/A	Shutdown of Voila.fr, a secondary free webmail portal. Shutdown of email service. Orange's primary consumer email domains, @orange.fr and @wanadoo.fr, remain active. Spam Resource: Orange.fr postmaster site
Telenor Denmark	Denmark	July 2014	@Telenor.dk @Tiscali.dk and others		Transferred to Jubii: En million danske Telenor-mailadresser reddet i 11. time - Computerworld Later acquired by Inbox.com
Telecom Malaysia	Malaysia	December 2013	@streamyx.com @tm.net.my @hsbb.com.my @bluehyppo.com @unifi.my	N/A	Shutdown of email service.
Tele2	Norway	May 2013	@tele2.no @c2i.net	N/A	Shutdown of email service. NRK: Tele2 stenger mailer
Rogers Communications	Canada	July 2004	@rogers.com	Yahoo	Partnered with Yahoo! to launch Rogers Yahoo! Hi-Speed Internet, migrating consumer email service onto Yahoo's platform. New signups for Rogers Yahoo! addresses ended 3 April 2024.
