= Gamesville =

Former casual gaming portal

- Company type: former Subsidiary of Lycos
- Industry: Online Games Developer/Portal
- Founded: 1995
- Headquarters: Waltham, MA, United States
- Products: Various, visit website for full product listing.
- Revenue: N/A
- Operating income: N/A
- Net income: N/A
- Number of employees: N/A
- Website: gamesville.com

Gamesville is a casual gaming portal founded in 1995 in Boston, Massachusetts by Steven Kane, Stuart Roseman and John Furse. Gamesville was acquired in 1999 by Web portal Lycos for $232 million in stock. Gamesville's tagline is "Wasting your time since 1996".

== History ==
Founded on a minimal capital base, Gamesville operated not just as a games provider but as a targeted marketing operation, offering free games and prizes to members as a way to attract large numbers of users while tailoring their proprietary games to meet the demands of advertisers. To play, members must provide demographic information; in turn, members would receive targeted ads based on the demographics provided. Gamesville pioneered the use of interstitial advertising as a method of monetizing game players.

Gamesville's first game, The Bingo Zone, enabled hundreds of people to compete against one another in real time, for free, and win up to $20 by getting a bingo. Initially, Kane was skeptical of launching a free online bingo game because bingo is traditionally associated with the elderly rather than the prized demographics most advertisers seek. However, on the day Gamesville.com launched in April 1996, the Wall Street Journal ran a story about Gen Xers playing bingo in bars, and Kane is quoted as saying, "It was as if God had whispered to us."

Over the years, additional free games with cash prizes were added, including card, trivia, puzzle, and several bingo variants. This approach attracted many visitors: In August 1999, Gamesville.com was the "stickiest" site on the Internet with eBay in second place.

== Lycos ==
In November 1999, internet portal Lycos announced that it would spend $270 million in stock to acquire Gamesville.com, which at that time had approximately 2.2 million registered users.

In 2002, Monster.com profiled Gamesville's Rewards Manager, Josh Yeager, citing him as holding one of the Top 10 Coolest Jobs on the Internet. Yeager estimated that he sent out between 1,000 and 2,500 prize checks weekly, indicating that "some days I feel like the Bob Barker of the Internet, other days like Santa Claus himself."

Over the years, Gamesville developed several games without prizes including a multiplayer online version of Spite and Malice and an online version of Spider Solitaire.

== Skilljam ==
In an attempt to reinvigorate the Gamesville site, Lycos entered into a year-long integration with Skilljam starting in 2006; purportedly the integration was designed to provide premium "best in class skill and casual free games for cash prizes, combined with exclusive games content not available anywhere else" to Gamesville players. However, instead, the integration with Skilljam only hastened the decline in traffic to Gamesville.

In April 2007, Lycos issued a public apology, announcing an end to the Skilljam partnership and a promise to return the site to its roots. The relaunch of the site included new premium games from WorldWinner and new download games provided by Oberon Media. A Tripod.com blog was also integrated into the site under the title "The Gamesville Blog". This blog is now powered by WordPress.

After the relaunch of Gamesville, traffic to the site steadily increased, although not to its former heights.

== Notable products ==
In March 2007, Gamesville launched Magic 21, a variant of blackjack, where multiple players compete to win a cash jackpot worth up to $4,999. The game is notable because it is the first proprietary jackpot game developed by Lycos/Gamesville since 2002's "The Price Is Right".

In July 2007, Gamesville launched a new avatar system enabling users to create 2D representations of themselves for use in Gamesville games. Gamesville currently holds "best avatar" contests in the Gamesville Blog.

On May 28, 2008, Gamesville relaunched Bingo Zone with a new design, a chat game called Dickie's Bonus Balls, and progressive cash prizes.

In January 2023, Gamesville was relaunched as a casual games website, getting back to its original roots. The site also hosts demo versions of casino games with affiliate marketing links for real money play.

== Notable intellectual property ==
Gamesville has several trademarks and patents in its portfolio, most notably US Patent 6,012,984, “Systems for providing large arena games over computer networks”.

== See also ==
- Online games
- Online bingo
- Browser game
- Lycos
