= Carlos von Riefel =

Austrian artist

Rubus linkianus or Link's Blackberry, a species (possibly a hybrid) known only in cultivation

Carlos von Riefel or Carlos Riefel aka Karlos von Riefel (15 July 1903 Kirchdorf an der Krems, Upper Austria – April 1993 Maria Enzersdorf, Lower Austria) was an Austrian botanical artist specialising in fruit and flower painting from 1937, who trained at the Vienna Academy of Arts. His meticulous paintings remain popular poster subjects. Before World War II he was a member of the Professional Association of Austrian Art Educators in Vienna. His illustrations appeared in divers publications such as The Rhododendron (Sussex: 1958–1962), A Folio of Fruit (London: 1957) and Flowers and Blooms from Mountain Country and Heath (Vienna: 1955). His wife Friederike was a noted portrait painter.
