= Olé (search engine) =

Search engine website

The Olé search engine (acronym for Ordenamientos de Links Especializados) was the first Internet search engine available in Spanish. It was opened to the public on 1 January 1996, at the address ole.es.

== History ==
The project was the result of a proposal by Pep Vallés, an employee of the public Fundació Catalana per la Recerca (FCR), for the creation of an Internet search engine to promote the implementation of the network in Catalan companies. The project was financed by the foundation itself, but shortly afterwards it was sold to Pep Valls himself for 200,000 pesetas in a controversial privatization.

Olé initially worked much like a directory. The Cinet team scoured the site for Spanish language resources for several months before its launch. They tried to cross-check information and verify its availability. The site was opened to the public on 1 January 1996 with around 2,000 references, after analysing more than 50,000 references. In March 1996, the site had more than one million hits. This number was growing almost exponentially and was later confirmed.

Over time, Olé diversified its services to include email, chat and bulletin boards. It went on to partner with other European portals, including Alleurope.

A survey carried out by AIMC-EGM in 1998 ranked Olé as the third most visited site by Spanish Internet users, after Yahoo! and El País Digital.

=== Telefónica ===
In March 1999, the heads of Olé and Telefónica signed a partnership agreement to become leaders in the Portuguese-Spanish content market. The Spanish multinational undertook to offer the portal's services free of charge to its customers in Spain, Portugal and South America, including free search and free e-mail.

Shortly afterwards, Telefónica improved its agreement with the purchase of Olé's technology for around 3,000 million pesetas and rights to shares in Terra, Telefónica's new portal. At the time of signing, the portal had approximately 5 million visits per month with a total of 27 million page views.

Olé's search engine eventually disappeared and was replaced by Lycos, which was later acquired by Terra.
