= CMGI =

Defunct American software company

Steel Connect, Inc.

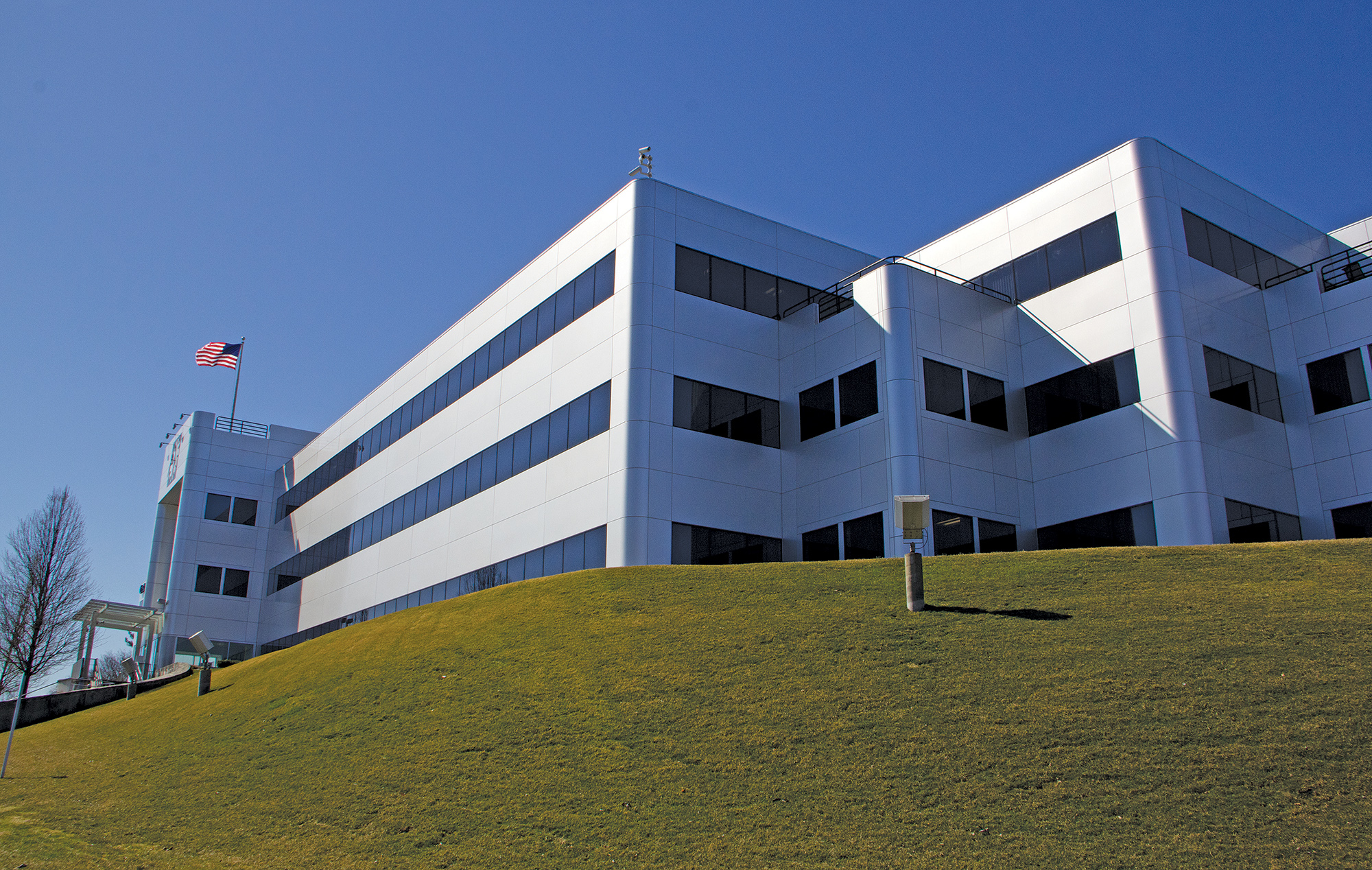
- Formerly: College Marketing Group; CMG Information Systems; ModusLink Global Solutions, Inc.
- Industry: Supply chain management
- Founded: 1968; 58 years ago
- Defunct: January 2, 2025; 22 months ago
- Fate: Acquired by Steel Partners
- Headquarters: Smyrna, Tennessee
- Key people: Warren G. Lichtenstein (interim CEO and executive chairman)
- Revenue: ▲$174 million (2024)
- Net income: ▲$85 million (2024)
- Total assets: ▲$485 million (2024)
- Total equity: ▲$154 million (2024)
- Number of employees: 1,358 (2019)
- Website: steelconnectinc.com

CMGI, Inc. (founded as College Marketing Group) was an American company. During the dot-com bubble, the company had a market capitalization of $41 billion. Between 1995 and 1999, it had the best-performing stock in the United States, returning 4,921%. After the crash of the bubble, the stock price fell 99.9%.

== History ==
The company was formed in 1968 as College Marketing Group by Glenn and Gail Mathews. At first, the company sold mailing lists of university faculty to textbook publishers. In 1986, after a leveraged buyout, David Wetherell became CEO, and the company became known as CMGI, Inc.

In February 1994, the company became a public company via an initial public offering. That same month, Wetherell founded BookLink, in which the company invested $900,000. BookLink was sold to America Online in November 1994, and the company used the proceeds of the sale to set up CMG @Ventures, a venture capital firm that invested in internet companies.

The company invested $1 million for an 80% ownership interest in Lycos, which was its most profitable investment. In 1997, the company invested in GeoCities and it also formed Navisite. In June 1999, the company agreed to acquire an 83% stake in AltaVista from Compaq for $2.3 billion. In September 1999, the company acquired AdForce for $500 million. In November 1999, Altavista acquired RagingBull.com after Wetherell noticed the website while on vacation.

In March 2000, the company acquired Yesmail. In April 2000, the company acquired uBid. In May 2000, the company acquired Tallan for $920M.

In August 2000, the company agreed to pay $7.6 million per year for 15 years for the naming rights of the home stadium of the New England Patriots. In August 2002, after the bursting of the dot-com bubble, the company modified the agreement and the stadium name was changed to Gillette Stadium.

In 2000, the company recorded a $661 million gain when Yahoo! acquired its interest in GeoCities. By that time, its stock price had declined 78% from its high earlier in the year. In February 2004, the company acquired Modus Media.

== Later history ==
In September 2008, the company changed its name to ModusLink Global Solutions, Inc.

In December 2017, the company acquired IWCO Direct for $476 million in cash.

In February 2018, the company changed its name to Steel Connect, Inc.

In May 2023, Steel Holdings acquired majority control of the company and infused $200 million of cash into the company. The remainder was acquired in January 2025.
