= Carafano v. Metrosplash.com, Inc. =

- Court: United States Court of Appeals for the Ninth Circuit
- Argued: June 2, 2003
- Decided: August 13, 2003
- Citation: 339 F.3d 1119 (9th Cir. 2003)

Case history
- Prior history: 207 F. Supp. 2d 1055 (C.D. Cal. 2002).

Court membership
- Judges sitting: Sidney Runyan Thomas, Richard A. Paez, Edward C. Reed, Jr. (D. Nev.)

Case opinions
- Majority: Thomas, joined by Paez, Reed

Laws applied
- Communications Decency Act

Carafano v. Metrosplash.com, Inc., 339 F.3d 1119 (9th Cir. 2003), is an American legal case dealing with the protection provided an internet service provider under the Communications Decency Act (CDA) United States Code Title 47 section 230(c)(1). It is also known as the Star Trek actress case as the plaintiff, Chase Masterson – whose legal name is Christianne Carafano – is well known for having appeared on Star Trek: Deep Space Nine. The case demonstrated that the use of an online form with some multiple choice selections does not override the protections against liability for the actions of users or anonymous members of a Web-based service.

== Facts ==
A man in Berlin created a bogus matchmaking profile for Masterson on Matchmaker.com, an online dating service. In the profile, the name "Chase" was used, along with her photograph and home address (even though home addresses are not allowed under Matchmaker.com policies). The man also used a Yahoo! email autoresponder in the profile to provide her physical address and telephone number in response to queries. Masterson requested that Matchmaker remove the profile; they initially refused on the basis that only a profile's creator could request its removal. After pressure from Masterson, Matchmaker ultimately agreed and removed the profile two days later. However, during the time that the profile remained online, Masterson received several sexually harassing voice mail messages and a fax which she found "highly threatening and sexually explicit" and "that also threatened her son". To protect herself, Masterson fled her home, living in hotels and traveling with her son for several months.

== History ==
Due to Matchmaker's initial refusal to remove the profile after they had been made aware of its existence, Masterson sued the company in California state court on the grounds of defamation of character, misappropriation of the right of publicity, invasion of privacy and negligence. The defendants removed the case to federal district court and brought a motion for summary judgment. The district court judge not only rejected the claim for the service provider immunity under the CDA, but Masterson's claims sounding in tort were also thrown out by the court as the service provider had not acted in any willful manner against Masterson and the court found that no duty of care existed between the service provider and Masterson. See Carafano v. Metrosplash.com Inc., 207 F. Supp. 2d 1055 (C.D. Cal. 2002).

Masterson appealed to the Ninth Circuit Court of Appeals. The appellate court rejected the plaintiff's argument and found no liability on the part of Matchmaker. The court found that Matchmaker is not an "information content provider," but rather an "interactive computer service" which allows the public to post information on its Web site. Under the Communications Decency Act, "interactive computer services" do not incur liability because users create the actual content. Thus liability rests with the underlying contributor, not the interactive computer service.
