= Juliana Neuhuber =

Austrian director

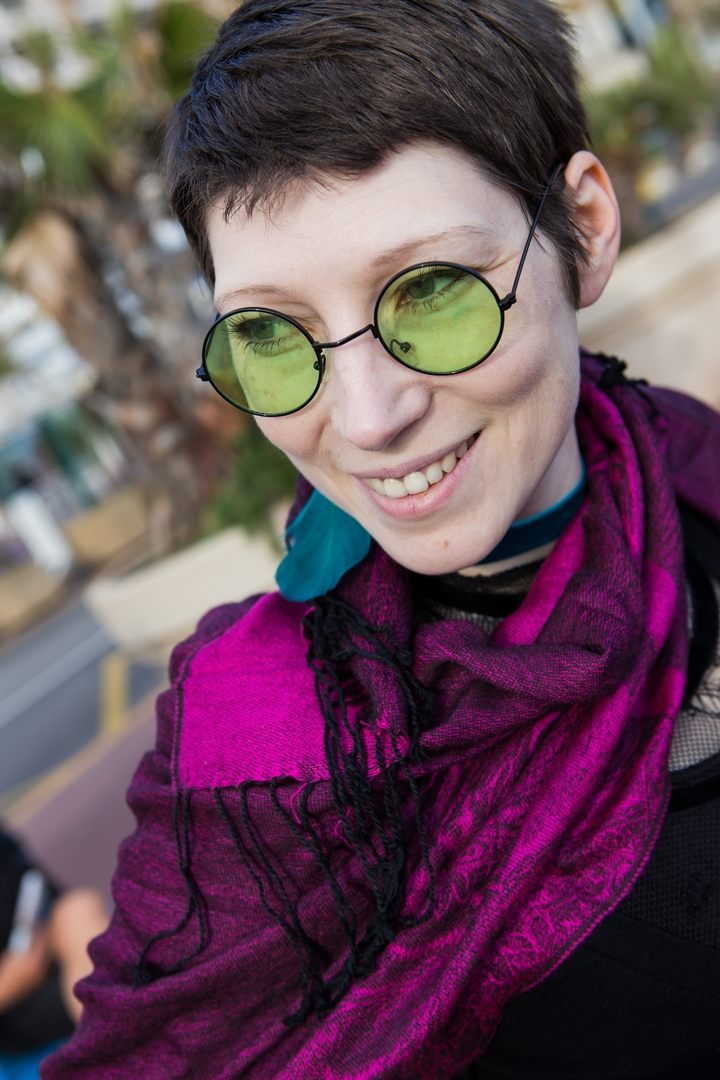
- Juliana Neuhuber at Cannes Film Festival, 2018.
- Born: 1979 (age 46–47); Kirchdorf an der Krems
- Occupations: film director, screenwriter, artist
- Years active: 1998–

Juliana Neuhuber (born 1979) is a director, screenwriter, and artist from Austria. She is based in Vienna.

Neuhuber has been active in the Austrian independent film scene since 1998, and realized many short films and artistic projects.

Her first feature film as a director is Je Suis Auto, written by Johannes Grenzfurthner. The film stars Johannes Grenzfurthner, Chase Masterson, and Jason Scott. It premiered in July 2024.

== Filmography (incomplete) ==
- Je Suis Auto (2024)

== Awards ==
- Austrian Indie Adler (Honorary Award) at the Austrian Filmfestival 2018
