= Yesmail =

- Type: Private
- Founded: Libertyville, Illinois 1995
- Headquarters: Portland, Oregon
- Key people: Michael Fisher, President
- Number of employees: 250
- Website: www.yesmail.com

Yesmail Interactive, is now known as Data Axle. The email marketing provider was previously headquartered in Portland, Oregon. Data Axle is headquartered in Dallas, Texas and has offices in San Francisco, Los Angeles, New York, Chicago, Boston, Atlanta, Omaha, Toronto, London and Singapore.

== History ==
The company was founded in 1995 under the name WebPromote, renaming in April 1999 to yesmail.com. The business grew based on its ability to use technology to manage its database of millions of e-mail addresses. Yesmail's growth led to a $37 million IPO in the fall of 1999, and was acquired by CMGI in 2000 for $520 million. Yesmail was later acquired by infoUSA in 2003.

In November 2006, Yesmail agreed to pay a $50,717 civil penalty to settle Federal Trade Commission charges that it violated the CAN-SPAM Act of 2003 by sending unsolicited commercial e-mails after consumers asked it to stop doing so. The FTC charged Yesmail, "doing business as @Once" at the time of the violation in 2004, with sending e-mail messages on behalf of its clients more than 10 business days after recipients had opted out. Citing the problem as one of the minor technical issues allowed under the Act, and not a violation of federal law, Yesmail deemed the charges too costly to fight, and agreed to settle. "Doing business as @Once" means the issue related to an incident that took place in 2004 before @once Inc. (then a Portland, OR-based e-mail marketing company) was integrated (along with its liabilities) in 2005 with infoUSA's existing e-mail subsidiary Yesmail.

In April 2017, Yesmail became known as Yes Lifecycle Marketing. In 2019, it dropped "Lifecycle" and became known as Yes Marketing. In May 2019, Yes Marketing, the announced that it would be sunsetting Yesmail. Yes Marketing will support its proprietary Yesmail platform for the next 36 months while actively migrating current clients onto Adobe Campaign.

== Acquisitions ==
- Markado, 2003
- @once, 2005
- Digital Connexxions, 2006

== See also ==
- Email marketing
