= FreeAdvice =

Freeadvice is a free US legal information web service that was established in 1997. In 2000 it was included by Forbes in its "Best of the Web" list, and in 2004 it was identified by PC World as one of the Best 125 free websites, and was featured sites in PC Magazine's Best 1000 websites. In 2001, it was included in a list of legal websites published by The New York Times. and was mentioned in a Wall Street Journal article about online legal advice websites.

Freeadvice is a property of Quote.com, based in Tampa, Florida.
