= Inktomi =

Former software company based in California

Inktomi Corporation
- Type: Public
- Traded as: Nasdaq: INKT
- Founded: January 1996; 30 years ago
- Founder: Eric Brewer; Paul Gauthier
- Fate: Acquired by Yahoo!
- Headquarters: Foster City, California
- Key people: David C. Peterschmidt (Chairman & CEO)
- Revenue: ▼$112 million (2002)
- Net income: ▼ -$500 million (2002)
- Total assets: ▼$145 million (2002)
- Total equity: ▼$46 million (2002)
- Number of employees: 200 (November 2002)

Inktomi Corporation was an American Internet service provider (ISP) software developer based in Foster City, California. Customers included Microsoft, HotBot, Amazon.com, eBay, and Walmart.

The company developed Traffic Server, a proxy server web cache for World Wide Web traffic and on-demand streaming media which transcoded images down to a smaller size for users of dial-up Internet access. Traffic Server was deployed by several large ISPs including AOL.

In 2003, after the bursting of the dot-com bubble, the company was acquired by Yahoo! for $241 million.

The company's name, pronounced "INK-tuh-me", was derived from a Lakota legend about the trickster spider Iktomi, known for his ability to outsmart larger adversaries. The tri-color nested cube logo was created by Tom Lamar in 1996.

== History ==
Inktomi was founded in January 1996 by University of California, Berkeley professor Eric Brewer and graduate student Paul Gauthier at the University of California, Berkeley. The company was initially founded based on the web search engine that was developed at the university. HotBot was the first search engine that made use of Inktomi's search technology.

=== 1998 to 1999 ===
In June 1998, the company raised $36 million in an initial public offering. Its success in making HotBot the top rated search engine led to Microsoft, Yahoo! and Disney all partnering with Inktomi.

In September 1998, the company acquired C2B Technologies for $95 million in stock, adding shopping engine technology to its portfolio.

In November 1998, the company raised additional capital at a 688% premium to its IPO price five months earlier.

In March 1999, CEO David Peterschmidt said that Inktomi would become an "arms merchant" to a growing number of content delivery network service providers. Inktomi received revenue based on a percentage of sales and/or a pay per click model.

In April 1999, the company acquired Impulse Buy Network, adding 400 merchants to its shopping engine.

In November 1999, the company acquired Webspective, which developed technology for content management across a host of distributed servers to be used in load balancing, for $106 million in stock.

=== 21st century ===
In March 2000, the company's stock peaked at a price of $241 per share.

In August 2000, the company acquired Ultraseek Server from The Walt Disney Company's Go.com.

In September 2000, the company acquired FastForward Networks, which developed software for the distribution of live streaming media over the Internet using "app-level" multicast technology, for $1.3 billion in stock.

In December 2000, the company acquired the Content Bridge Business Unit from Adero, a content delivery network, which had formed the Content Bridge Alliance with Inktomi and other ISPs, hosting providers and IP transport providers in August 2000.

An article written by Danny Sullivan for Search Engine Watch on October 1, 2001, revealed that Inktomi accidentally allowed the public to access its database of spam websites, which contained over one million of such sites, through a search result on competing search engine AllTheWeb. The database was found by Brett Tabke, who ran the Search Engine World website.

In July 2001, the company acquired eScene Networks, which developed software that provided an integrated workflow for the management and publishing of video content.

In 2002, after the burst of the dot-com bubble, the company was restructured by Keyur Patel who joined Inktomi as investor, and senior vice president, strategy, marketing and technology.

His restructuring led to the sale of the Ultraseek Server product (renamed Inktomi Enterprise Search) to Verity in late 2002 and the sale of the rest of the company to Yahoo!'s Yahoo! Search for $1.63 per share, or $241 million, completed on March 19, 2003.

In 2006, the technology behind the Inktomi Proxy Server was acquired by Websense, which was modified and included in the Websense Security Gateway.

In 2009, Yahoo! donated the Traffic Server technology to the Apache Software Foundation.
