= HotBot =

AI company; former search engine

- Website type: Chatbot
- Available in: English
- Owner: Hotbot Services LLC.
- Website: www.hotbot.com
- Commercial: Yes
- Launched: May 27, 1996; 30 years ago
- Current status: Working

HotBot was a Canadian web search engine originally owned by HotBot Limited, owned by Kristen Richardson. The search engine was initially launched in North America in 1996 by Wired magazine. During the 1990s, it was one of the most popular search engines on the World Wide Web. The domain was sold in 2016 and was used for other unrelated purposes for several years. Hotbot search engine was relaunched from 2022-2024. As of 2026, Hotbot is a chat AI assistant website.

== History (1996 - 2016) ==
HotBot search engine and internet directory in 1997 (as captured by the Wayback Machine archive)

HotBot was launched in May 1996 by Wired online division HotWired, as a tool providing search results served by the Inktomi database. The search engine was co-developed by Inktomi, a four-month-old start-up staffed by University of California, Berkeley students. HotBot was launched using a "new links" strategy of marketing, claiming to index the entire web weekly, more often than competitors like AltaVista, and its website stated it being the "most complete Web index online" with 54 million documents. Its colorful interface and impressive features (e.g. being able to search with any entered words, or an entire phrase) drew acclaim and popularity.

Directory results were provided originally by LookSmart and then DMOZ from mid-1999. HotBot also used search data from Direct Hit Technologies for a period starting February 1999, which was a tool that used click-through data to manipulate results. Inktomi's Smart Crawl technology, allowing 10 million webpages to be crawled weekly, was incorporated into HotBot in March 1997. HotBot was the 19th most visited website based on web traffic as of 1998.

Lycos acquired HotBot as part of its acquisition of Wired in October 1998 and it was run separately, alongside Lycos's already existing search engine. Hereafter, HotBot languished with limited development and falling market share. A HotBot NeoPlanet browser was also released which integrated HotBot and other Wired and Lycos links. At the end of 2002, HotBot was relaunched as a multiple option search tool, giving users the option to search either the FAST, Google, Inktomi or Teoma databases.

In March 2004, Lycos launched a beta release of a free toolbar search product, Lycos HotBot DeskTop, which the company said was "the first product to integrate traditional desktop search with Web search within the browser." The HotBot DeskTop could search the Internet using Inktomi, e-mail folders for Microsoft Outlook or Outlook Express, and user documents stored on a hard drive. It also incorporated a blocker for pop-up ads and an RSS News Reader syndication. Indexes created to track e-mail and user files remained stored locally to protect user privacy. Text-based ads were displayed when viewing results for several types of Internet searches. Lycos licensed dtSearch technology to power the local search options.

In July 2011, HotBot was relaunched with a new robot-like mascot, a new logo, and a modern site design. In the beta, HotBot became a portal, returning not just web search results, but also searches from various Lycos websites, such as News, Shopping and Weather Zombie. The portal interface lasted for roughly six months, and these features were instead reincorporated into the 2012 Lycos website redesign, returning HotBot to a simplified search interface.

== Sale and Reconstitution (2016 - Present) ==
In October 2016, Lycos sold the Hotbot.com domain name for $155,000 to an unnamed buyer. Afterwards, the HotBot domain became home to an unrelated shopping search site, ending the 20-year history of the original site. In April 2018, the domain was put under new ownership and became an unrelated privacy-focused search engine. As of 2020, the HotBot domain was being controlled by a VPN company based in Seychelles.

In 2023, the aforementioned VPN company pivoted HotBot to offering services based on search via Generative AI, inspired by, though not officially affiliated with, the domain's original usage in 1996. HotBot continues to be operational, offering web services in LLMs, in 2026.
