= Quotation (disambiguation) =

Quotation is a reference to a previously known expression.

Quotation may also refer to:

== Quotation marks ==
Meanings related to characters used for quotation are:

- Quotation marks, usage in English language
- Quotation marks, international variation
- Quotation mark glyphs, various glyphs used
- String literals, in programming languages

== See also ==
- Quote (disambiguation)
