= Kirchdorf an der Krems =

- Municipality
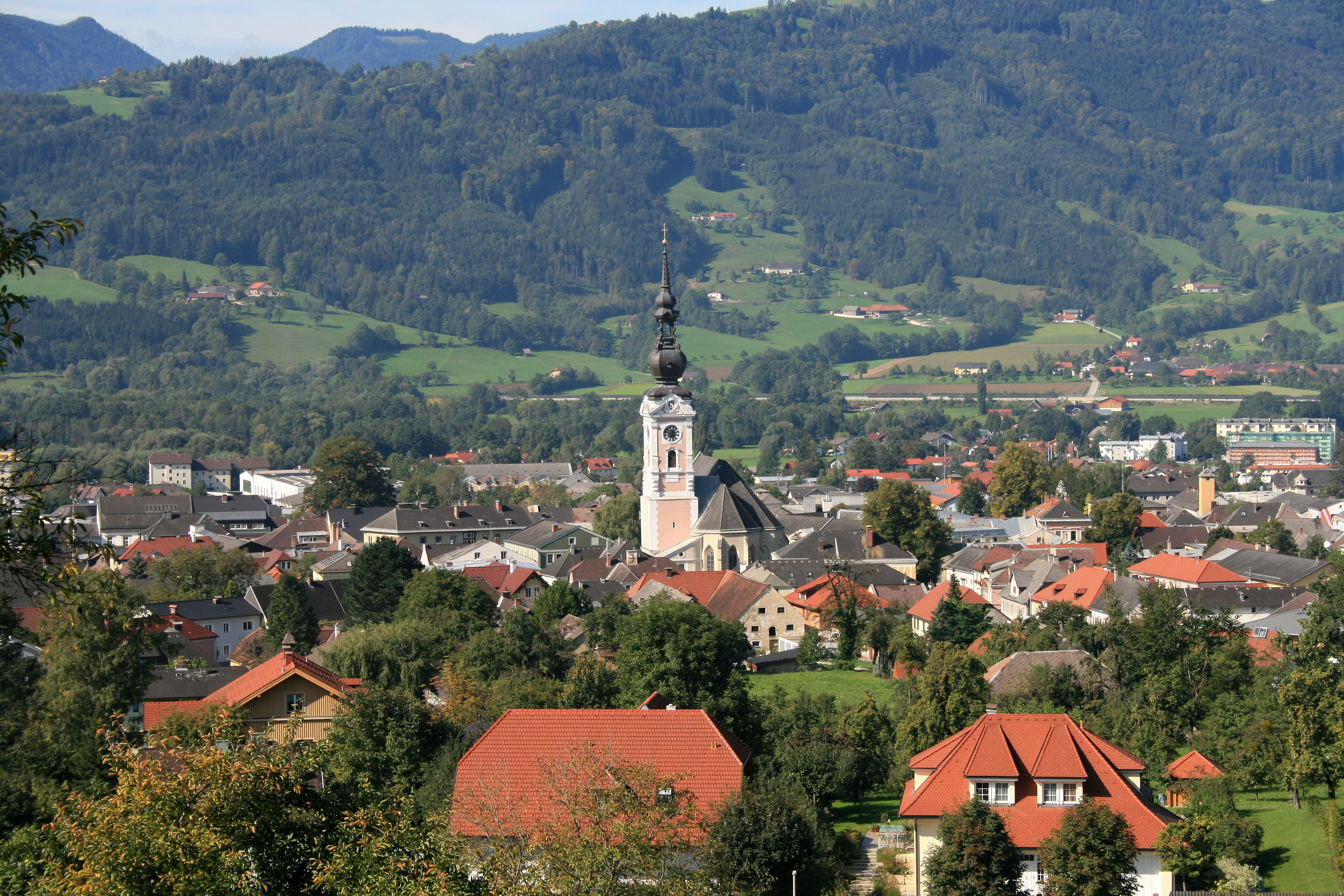
- General view of the town

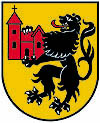
- Coat of arms

- Location within Austria
- Coordinates: 47°54′24″N 14°0′0″E
- Country: Austria
- State: Upper Austria
- District: Kirchdorf an der Krems

Government
  - Mayor: Markus Ringhofer (SPÖ)

Area
  - Total: 2.78 km^{2} (1.07 sq mi)
- Elevation: 450 m (1,480 ft)

Population (2018-01-01)
  - Total: 4,502
  - Density: 1,620/km^{2} (4,190/sq mi)
- Time zone: UTC+1 (CET)
  - Summer (DST): UTC+2 (CEST)
- Postal code: 4560
- Area code: 07582
- Vehicle registration: KI
- Website: www.kirchdorf.at

Kirchdorf an der Krems is a town in the Austrian state of Upper Austria on the river Krems, in the district of Kirchdorf an der Krems. Apparently settled by the year 903, it has 4,104 inhabitants in a relatively small area of 3 km^{2}.

== Population ==
Historical population
Year	Pop.	±%
1869	1,534	—
1880	1,522	−0.8%
1890	1,613	+6.0%
1900	1,602	−0.7%
1910	1,769	+10.4%
1923	1,738	−1.8%
1934	1,707	−1.8%
1939	1,862	+9.1%
1951	2,632	+41.4%
1961	2,964	+12.6%
1971	3,512	+18.5%
1981	3,702	+5.4%
1991	3,738	+1.0%
2001	4,099	+9.7%
2011	4,048	−1.2%

== Notable people ==
- Josef Redtenbacher (1810–1870), an Austrian chemist, discovered acrolein and acrylic acid; researched composition of taurine.
- Ludwig Redtenbacher (1814–1876), Austrian doctor and entomologist, interested in beetles.
- Josef Redtenbacher (1856–1926), an Austrian entomologist and teacher.
- Carlos von Riefel (1903–1993), botanical artist specialising in fruit and flower painting
- Max Grodénchik (born 1952), an American stage, film and television actor, lives locally
- Juliana Neuhuber (born 1979), a director, screenwriter, filmmaker and artist

=== Sport ===
- Gerlinde Kaltenbrunner (born 1970), an Austrian mountaineer.
- Christian Ramsebner (born 1989), an Austrian footballer who has played over 360 games
- Nils Zatl (born 1992), an Austrian footballer who has played over 250 games
