= RagingBull.com =

- Website type: Financial literacy
- Headquarters: Lee, New Hampshire
- Website: ragingbull.com
- Launched: 1997; 29 years ago

RagingBull.com is a website focused on financial literacy.

== History ==
RagingBull.com was founded in August 1997 by Bill Martin with college partners Rusty Szurek and Greg Wright, who were 19 years old at the time, as a hobby. It was begun in a basement with an initial investment of $30,000 from savings and credit card loans.

By mid-1998, the website had 8,000 registered users.

David Wetherell, CEO of CMGI, discovered the website while on vacation. In October 1998, CMGI invested $2 million in Raging Bull for a 40% stake. At that time, the co-founders were each 21 years old.

In February 2000, AltaVista, which was majority owned by CMGI, acquired the website in a stock transaction. At that time, Raging Bull had 425,000 registered members, 12 million daily page views, and message boards where users posted 35,000 messages per day.

In January 2001, Terra acquired the website.

In February 2006, Terra's Lycos division sold Quote.com and RagingBull.com to Interactive Data Corporation for $30 million, which integrated them into eSignal.

In June 2017, Chuck Jaffe was named chief editor of the website. After a short, 6-month "experiment" with Jaffe as editor, the site changed direction and Jaffe was released from his position.

== Lawsuit and settlements ==
In December 2020, the Federal Trade Commission accused the company of defrauding consumers out of more than $137 million over the previous three years and making it difficult for customers to cancel their monthly subscriptions. In December 2021, the owners of the site agreed to pay $700,000 in refunds to New Hampshire customers and an additional $675,000 in administrative fines to settle claims by state securities regulators. In March 2022, RagingBull.com as well Sherwood Ventures LLC and defendants Jason Bond and Jeff Bishop paid $2.425 million to settle what the FTC called "bogus stock earnings claims" and a hard to cancel subscription service. The company also agreed to modify certain marketing practices.
