= Jubii =

Coordinates: 55.682644°N 12.588136°E

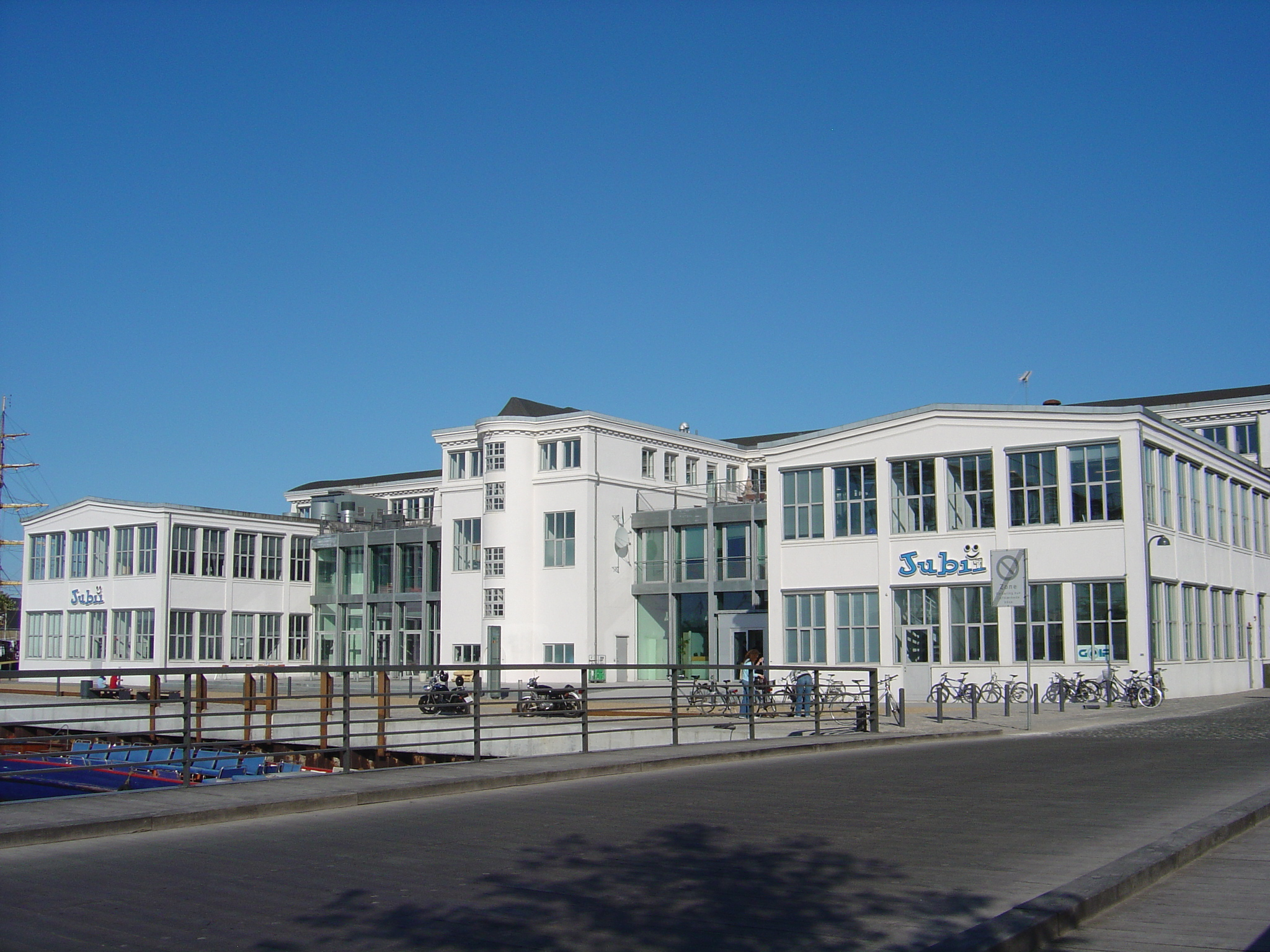
Jubii HQ in Copenhagen Denmark

Jubii is a webportal based in Copenhagen. Jubii provides a search engine and other services, including e-mail.

Jubii was originally created in the summer 1995 by Jakob Faarvang later incorporated by the Cybernet founders Kasper Larsen, Henrik Sorensen, Martin Thorborg and Andreas Jurgensen. Jubii grew to become the most used Danish Internet portal, with a market reach of 92% of all Danish Internet users, with an advertising market share of more than 65%, for a short time.

Jubii was sold in 2000 to Lycos Europe. This became Lycos Europe's Danish 'search and community business'. Lycos Inc was purchased by Daum Communications of South Korea who owns the Lycos trademark in the United States. Lycos Europe now wants to expand into the USA but can not use the Lycos name so is using 'Jubii' from April 2007 for its web 2.0 service. Users of Lycos Europe web e-mail service are being switched over to the jubii.com brand. Jubii was currently up for sale in September 2008.

On January 18, 2009, troubled Lycos who already shutdown Web Hosting and Tripod in recent months decided to shut down its US ventures and hereby Jubii.com.

Jubii was sold to Managing Director Peter Lundsgaard and a group of investors for an undisclosed amount in December 2008.

Jubii Europe, the former owner of Jubii, was liquidated in 2021.

== See also ==
- Lycos Europe
