= Highland Capital Partners =

Global venture capital firm

- Type: Private
- Industry: Private Equity
- Founded: 1988; 38 years ago
- Founder: William Boyce, Paul Maeder, Bob Higgins
- Headquarters: Cambridge, Massachusetts, United States
- Products: Investments, Venture capital
- Website: www.hcp.com

Highland Capital Partners is a Boston, Massachusetts-based global venture capital firm with offices in Silicon Valley, and San Francisco. The company was founded in 1987 by Paul Maeder and Bob Higgins.

Highland has raised over $4 billion in committed capital and invested in more than 280 companies, with 47 IPOs and 134 acquisitions.

== History ==
The company was co-founded by Paul Maeder and Bob Higgins in 1987.

=== Investments and investment funds ===
Highland is typically the first institutional investor in the companies they back.

Since its founding in 1988, the firm has raised eleven venture capital funds:

- 1988 — Highland Capital Partners
- 1992 — Highland Capital Partners II
- 1996 — Highland Capital Partners III
- 1998 — Highland Capital Partners IV
- 2000 — Highland Capital Partners V
- 2001 — Highland Capital Partners VI
- 2006 — Highland Capital Partners VII
- 2009 — Highland Capital Partners VIII
- 2013 — Highland Capital Partners 9
- 2018 — Highland Capital Partners 10
- 2020 — Highland Capital Leaders Fund

=== Notable investments ===
The company has invested some $4 billion in more than 280 companies since its founding, including 2U, Auris Health, Bromium, Clearbanc, Everlywell, Gigamon, Imprivata LevelUp, Lululemon Athletica, Malwarebytes, Qihoo 360, Quattro Wireless, Rent the Runway, Scopely, ThredUp, Turbonomic and VistaPrint. In November 2021, Highland Capital Partners led a $38 million Series B funding round in Stellar Cyber, a cybersecurity company specializing in Open Extended Detection and Response (Open XDR) and Integrated Security Operations Center (ISOC) technology.

=== Current and former employees ===
Notable members of the team include Bob Davis, the founder of Lycos; Gaurav Tewari, the founder of Omega Venture Partners, and formerly of Highland Capital Partners; and Wyc Grousbeck, owner of the Boston Celtics. In February 2005, Thomas G. Stemberg, the founder and former CEO of Staples, joined Highland.

== Other ==
Highland Capital Partners is not affiliated with Highland Capital Management, the distressed investment firm, hedge fund sponsor, and mutual fund manager based in Dallas, Texas.

In November 2020, several of the senior GPs partnered with Ian Friedman, former co-head of Goldman Sachs Investment Partners (Venture Capital and Growth Equity Team) and formed Highland Transcend Partners I, a SPAC that targets disruptive commerce, digital media, and enterprise software. The founding team consists of Friedman (CEO), Bob Davis (executive chairman), Dan Nova (chief investment officer) and Paul Maeder (CFO).

- The Rebirth of Venture Capitalism. New York Times, September 24, 2006
- "Company News; Staples Names Its Chief as Chairman". The New York Times. March 12, 2005.
