= Dick Sabot =

American economist

Richard Sabot (February 16, 1944 – July 6, 2005) was an economist, scholar, farmer, and Internet pioneer who was co-founder of Tripod.com, one of the first and most successful dot-coms, in 1992. (It was subsequently sold to Lycos in 1998) He was also a co-founder of Eziba (later acquired by Overstock.com), an Internet venture which sold handcrafted goods from artisans around the world. He was a professor emeritus of economics at Williams College, and previously taught at Yale University, Oxford University, and Columbia University. He was a leading figure in building the Internet economy of Williamstown, Massachusetts, where the Green River ran past enough digital businesses in the dot-com era to earn the nickname "Silicon River"

He was born in New York City and attended college at the University of Pennsylvania and completed his doctorate at Oxford University. He subsequently worked for ten years at the World Bank and was also a senior advisor to the Inter-American Development Bank and International Food Policy Research Institute. He wrote or edited a dozen books on development economics and was co-author of several influential papers in the field, including The East Asian Miracle: Economic Growth and Public Policy.

He served on the board of directors of several companies including Lycos, Geekcorps, and the International Executive Service Corps. He was an active member of the executive board of the Center for Global Development; an Honorary Fellow of Pembroke College, Oxford University (UK); and a member of the Boards of Overseers of the College of Arts and Sciences of the University of Pennsylvania and of Colby College.

At the time of his death, Sabot was launching a new business, Cricket Creek Farm, focused on producing organic milk and specialty cheeses. He died in 2005, aged 61, of a heart attack near his home in Williamstown, Massachusetts, and was survived by his wife, Jude Sabot and their four children.
