= Rubus linkianus =

Scientific classification
- Kingdom: Plantae
- Clade: Tracheophytes
- Clade: Angiosperms
- Clade: Eudicots
- Clade: Rosids
- Order: Rosales
- Family: Rosaceae
- Genus: Rubus
- Species: R. linkianus

Binomial name
- Rubus linkianus Ser. 1825

Synonyms
- Rubus paniculatus Schltdl. ex Link 1822, illegitimate homonym not Sm. 1819; Rubus hedycarpus f. linkianus Zabel

Species of fruit and plant

Rubus linkianus is a European species of brambles in the rose family. It is cultivated for its fruits and as an ornamental. It is occasionally naturalized in scattered locations in the United States.

The genetics of Rubus is extremely complex, so that it is difficult to decide on which groups should be recognized as species. There are many rare species with limited ranges such as this. Further study is suggested to clarify the taxonomy.
