= Angelfire =

Website hosting service

- Angelfire homepage
- Website type: Paid web hosting service
- Dissolved: April 3, 2026; 7 months ago
- Owner: Lycos
- Website: Official website
- Advertising: Yes
- Commercial: Yes
- Registration: Yes
- Launched: 1996; 30 years ago
- Current status: Inactive since April 3, 2026; 7 months ago

Angelfire was a web hosting service that offered website services, including blog building and a photo gallery builder.

Angelfire started off as a paid service in 1996, before becoming free use due to Lycos investing into it. In 2010, Angelfire went back to being a paid service. Free sites that were still active at that point remained online.

It was shut down in April 2026 alongside Tripod, although sites hosted on Angelfire were inaccessible after a server outage in January of that year.

== History ==
Angelfire launched in 1996 and was originally a combination website building and medical transcription service. The site dropped the transcription service and focused solely on website hosting, offering only paid memberships.

Angelfire was acquired by WhoWhere in October 1997. WhoWhere was acquired by Lycos in August 1998, for US$133 million. Lycos subsequently made Angelfire its web building tools free to use, with an option to pay to remove banner ads that Angelfire would place on free websites.

In 2010, Angelfire returned to being a paid service by restricting features in the website builder for existing free users, and removing the ability to make new free websites altogether. Existing free sites remained.

In January 2026, Angelfire, together with Tripod and Lycos Mail, suffered a major server outage. All user-generated sites hosted on Angelfire were permanently inaccessible after this outage, returning only HTTP 502 and HTTP 403 errors if a user-made page was accessed; only the homepage remained online.

The service was shut down in April 2026, with the homepage shutting down on April 24.
