= Quote, Missouri =

Extinct town in Missouri, US

Coordinates: 39°32′21″N 93°41′00″W

Quote is an extinct town in Carroll County, in the U.S. state of Missouri. The GNIS classifies it as a populated place.

A post office called Quote was established in 1892, and remained in operation until 1919. The source of the name Quote is obscure.
