= Weather Zombie =

- Owner: Lycos
- Website: Weatherzombie.com
- Commercial: Yes
- Launched: October 2010; 16 years ago
- Current status: Offline

Weather Zombie was a website and mobile app for iOS that provided zombie-themed weather forecasting via a weather data feed from AccuWeather.

It was created by Lycos and launched in mid-October 2010.

== Overview ==
Weather Zombie provided worldwide weather forecasting for current, seven-day and hour-by-hour conditions. There was also radar information; however, it only covered the United States and parts of Canada. Aside from weather forecasting, Weather Zombie irregularly posted comic strips based on images loosely depicted from radar images as well as comic strips that feature the site's zombies in various situations.

In October 2011, Weather Zombie released a mobile app for iOS.

By May 2012, the mobile app was no longer available.
