= Terra (company) =

Web portal and internet company, subsidiary of Telefônica Brasil

Terra Networks Brasil, S.A.
- Trade name: Terra
- Type: Sociedad Anónima
- Industry: Internet
- Predecessor: Terra Networks, S.A.
- Founded: Madrid, Spain (January 25, 1999)
- Founder: Juan Villalonga
- Headquarters: Madrid, Spain
- Area served: Brazil
- Key people: David Giner García (CEO)
- Services: Web portal, Internet service provider, Search engine
- Parent: Telefónica, S.A. Telefônica Brasil (in Brazil)
- Website: www.terra.com.br www.terra.com www.terra.com.mx www.terra.cl www.terra.com.co www.terra.us www.terra.com.pe

Terra was a Spanish Internet multinational company owned by Telefónica. It was headquartered in Spain and had offices in Brazil, Chile, Colombia, Mexico, the United States and Peru. Part of the Telefónica Group (the former Spanish public telephone monopoly), Terra operated as a web portal or Internet access provider in the United States, Spain and 16 Latin American countries. It was founded in 1999 as Terra Networks, S.A., a publicly traded company with Telefónica as its main shareholder. All outstanding shares were purchased by Telefónica in 2017, making Terra a wholly owned subsidiary.

Terra currently provides Internet content, web portals and digital services, with operations dating back more than 25 years. Since 2020, Terra Networks LATAM has operated separately from Telefónica's commercial activities in Brazil, while continuing its involvement in online media and related digital services.

== History ==
Terra was founded in 1999 as Terra Networks, S.A. by Juan Villalonga, Telefónica's president between 1996 and 2000, and grew in size through the acquisitions of several local startups in Spain and the main Latin American markets: Olé (Spain), ZAZ (Brazil), Mexico, Gauchonet, Donde (Argentina) and Chevere (Venezuela).

Terra has created several digital portals, like Invertia, a successful finance portal, and Educaterra (e-learning). It also has had or has stakes in other Internet ventures: Uno-e (online banking), Rumbo (travel, in partnership with Amadeus), Atrea (real estate, in partnership with Spanish bank BBVA), and more.

In November 1999, still during the period known as the "Internet bubble", Terra had a high-profile IPO both in the U.S. and Spain, and its shares skyrocketed. After that, the price fell sharply until it reached 2.75 euros in October 2004. This process sparked a lot of public controversy in Spain, where thousands of small investors acquired shares of Terra during the boom.

During 2003 and 2004 Terra expanded aggressively into the paid content business, mainly in Spain, Brazil, and Chile, launching ventures with Disney and Spanish football clubs Real Madrid and FC Barcelona. It also started several entertainment services, including an online multiplayer gaming platform (Terra Games) and a digital music service (Terra Música Premium) similar to Apple Computer's iTunes.

From that period until 2017, Terra focused on Internet-based content and services.

In 2020, Terra Networks LATAM began operating independently from Telefónica's commercial activities in Brazil and updated its regional portals. The company also continued to offer digital services for business users.

== Terra and Lycos ==
In April 2000, Terra acquired Lycos, a U.S. portal, in a stock swap valued at US$12.5 billion. By that time, Lycos was the third most visited portal in the U.S., and had a strong presence in key European and Asian markets. Lycos CEO Bob Davis was moved to the position of CEO of the combined company, from where he stepped down in January 2001, being replaced by then Chairman Joaquim Agut.

Part of the deal was also German media giant Bertelsmann, owner of a stake in Lycos Europe. In exchange for keeping the control over Lycos Europe, Bertelsmann agreed to spend US$1 billion worth in advertising at Terra Lycos through a five-year period. That spending was crucial for Terra to survive the times of the Internet crash, when several Latin American-based Internet companies like Quepasa, Starmedia or El Sitio lost cash up to the point of filing for bankruptcy or being taken over by bigger companies.

In 2003 Bertelsmann executed an option to get itself out of the agreement, transferring to Terra's parent company Telefónica the obligation to keep the ad spending. Soon after that, Telefónica decided to get more control over Terra and launched an offer for shares of Terra still floating on the stock market. Although it granted Telefónica control over more than 70% of Terra's stock, the move was not successful enough to let Telefónica take Terra out of the public, as was allegedly its objective.

In October 2004, following Telefónica's decision to re-focus their businesses, Terra sold Lycos to South Korean Internet portal company Daum Communications for US$105 million. Kim Faura was Terra's last chairman. Joaquim Agut was the previous one, and now he is chairman of Endemol.

== Telefonica take-over ==
In February 2005, Telefónica announced its intention of taking full control of Terra by giving Telefónica shares in exchange for Terra's remaining shares in the stock market. After this plan was approved by both Telefónica and Terra shareholders meetings, Terra's shares were finally excluded from the market on July 15, 2005.

Terra Networks S.A. was then merged into Telefónica, S.A. and, therefore, disappeared from a legal point of view. A small portion of the former corporate headquarters became "Terra Networks Asociadas, S.L.U." (a new company) and local Terra operations (and assets) were transferred to local fixed-line Telefónica companies.

Prior to 2017, Terra's work was centered on Internet-based services and the distribution of online content. In July 2017 the website was shut down in the United States, Argentina, Chile, Colombia, Spain, México and Peru. In the following years, the company expanded its activity to include the development of digital solutions for businesses, adapting to new technological trends.

== Terra.com ==
In the early 2000s, Terra was the largest Latin American online media company, ranked as the 31st most popular Internet destination in the world. The website primarily provided entertainment, news and sports to approximately 100 million monthly visitors, Terra was named as one of the most innovative company in the music area by Fast Company in 2011.

Terra Networks Brazil has offices in cities such as São Paulo and Porto Alegre, Brazil.

Terra Networks Latam currently runs portals in Chile, Colombia, Mexico, Peru, and the United States, providing content and information for audiences in those regions.
