= Tripod (web hosting) =

Web hosting service

- Website type: web hosting service
- Founded: 1992–1994
- Dissolved: April 24, 2026; 6 months ago
- Headquarters: Waltham, USA
- Owner: Lycos
- Founders: Bo Peabody, Brett Hershey, and Dick Sabot
- Website: Official website
- Advertising: Yes
- Commercial: Yes
- Registration: Yes
- Launched: 1995; 31 years ago
- Current status: Inactive since April 24, 2026; 6 months ago

Tripod.com was a web hosting service owned by Lycos. Originally aiming its services to college students and young adults, it was one of several sites trying to build online communities during the 1990s. As such, Tripod formed part of the first wave of user-generated content.

In 2009, Tripod removed the ability to make new free webpages, becoming a paid-only service. Existing free webpages remained online.

Tripod was shut down on April 24, 2026, together with Angelfire, another web hosting service owned by Lycos.

== Services ==
Tripod offered web hosting with two paid plans, "personal" and "professional", which differ in features and storage space, but are both powered by the web authoring system "Lycos Publish". This tool has completely replaced the former offering of more general web hosting and removed free plans altogether.

Tripod offered free and paid web hosting services, including 20 megabytes of storage space and the ability to run Common Gateway Interface (CGI) scripts in Perl. In addition to basic hosting, Tripod also offered a blogging tool, a photo album manager, and the Trellix site builder for WYSIWYG page editing. Tripod's for-pay services included additional disk space, a shopping cart, domain names, web and POP/IMAP email.

== History ==
Tripod originated in 1992 with two Williams College classmates, Bo Peabody and Brett Hershey, along with Dick Sabot, an economics professor at the school. The company was headquartered in Williamstown, Massachusetts, with Peabody as CEO. Although it would eventually focus on the Internet, Tripod also published a magazine, Tools for Life, that was distributed with textbooks, and offered a discount card for students.

=== Website launch ===
The domain name Tripod.com was created on September 29, 1994 and the site officially launched in 1995 after operating in "sneak-preview mode" for a period. Billed as a "hip Web site and pay service for and by college students", it offered how-to advice on practical issues that might concern young people when first living away from home. It planned to charge a minimal fee and make money primarily on commissions from partners who would sell products on the site. Other services available included résumé writing features and a simple home page builder.

Although the feature was an afterthought originally, Tripod soon became known as a place where people could create free web pages, competing with the likes of GeoCities and Angelfire. Criticizing AOL, the existing leader in this space, for its "walled-garden" approach, Peabody described the company's aims: "Our idea is to build a community through user-created and user-based content." A reviewer in The Washington Post recommended Tripod over GeoCities for giving users an easier URL to remember, and because GeoCities sites had a tendency to crash computers.

=== Investment and buyout ===
After receiving an initial investment of US$4 million in venture capital, led by New Enterprises Associates, in May 1997 Tripod took an additional round of investment totaling US$10 million. By this time the company had grown to 40 employees and was hoping to reach profitability by the 1st quarter of 1998. The second group of investors included Interpublic, which paid US$2.5 million for a stake in Tripod estimated at 10 percent, thus implying a valuation of US$25 million for the company overall. On February 3, 1998, Lycos announced they had acquired Tripod for a reported US$58 million in stock.

Lycos also ended up owning Tripod's former competitor Angelfire, picked up as part of the acquisition of WhoWhere. The two properties were run concurrently, with Tripod continuing to focus on its college-age audience while Angelfire tended to attract high school users. In early 2001, Tripod reached six million registered users (up from nearly one million at the time it was acquired) and was expanding at an estimated 250,000 new sites per month. However, generating profits remained difficult, with an analyst opining that they needed better user profiling so the sites could generate the results expected by advertisers. They also had the challenge of not alienating users while trying to make money. By the end of the year, Tripod and Angelfire also introduced account options allowing users to pay in order to keep their sites ad-free. GeoCities, now acquired by Yahoo!, would follow suit not long afterward.

In 2009, Tripod removed the option to use its services for free. After this, new users were required to pay for it.

=== Closure ===
On March 6, 2026, Lycos announced that their services, namely Tripod as well as Angelfire, were experiencing temporary outages in a note on their frontpage. Later that day, the message was updated to say "To our users of Angelfire and Tripod. We apologize for the service interruptions. Unfortunately we will be shutting down in the next 30 days. Please move your hosting to another host as soon as possible." The message was removed from the homepage shortly after, without further official statement from the company. On April 3, 2026, the message reappeared once more, still without further official statement from Lycos. Tripod ceased all operations on April 24, 2026.

== Domain name ==
Web sites generally were a subdomain of tripod.com. However, users could pay a monthly charge and own a domain name. Paying in this manner also allowed for other benefits, such as more disk space for the site which allows the site owner to put more information onto it, and personalized email accounts.

== Logos ==
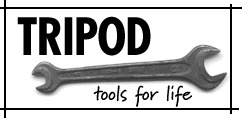
From 1996

From 1998

From 2000

From 2007 to 24 February 2010

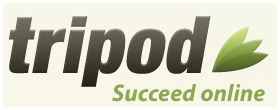
From 25 February 2010 to 16 October 2011

From 18 October 2011 to 23 December 2011

From 23 December 2011 to 24 April 2026
