= Quote.com =

Online insurance marketplace

- Founded: 1993; 33 years ago
- Headquarters: St. Petersburg, Florida
- Area served: United States
- Owners: Osceola Lead Generation Holdings, LLC
- CEO: Nicholas Stommes
- Key people: Chase Nichols (CMO) Anand Iyer (CTO) Tom Guidroz (CFO)
- Industry: Insurance
- Website: www.quote.com

Quote.com is a U.S.-based insurance comparison website headquartered in St. Petersburg, Florida. Operating in all 50 states and Washington, D.C., the company provides educational resources and online quote comparison tools that help consumers research insurance products, compare coverage options from multiple providers, and make informed insurance decisions. Quote.com offers information and quote comparison services for auto, home, renters, life, health, pet, business, motorcycle, and Medicare insurance.

== History ==
Founded in 1993, Quote.com was one of the first financial portals. Today, it operates as a tech-enabled digital media and performance marketing platform, enabling dozens of high-performing consumer-centric brands and hundreds more via partnerships and integrations.

== Products and operations ==
Quote.com operates as an online insurance comparison platform serving consumers in all 50 U.S. states and Washington, D.C. The company provides educational resources and digital comparison tools designed to help users research insurance products and compare quotes from multiple licensed insurance providers.

The platform offers comparison capabilities across several insurance categories, including auto, home, renters, life, health, pet, business, motorcycle, and Medicare coverage. Users can compare rates and coverage options from participating insurance providers through Quote.com’s online quote tools.

In addition to quote comparison services, Quote.com publishes educational articles, provider reviews, and insurance guides intended to help consumers better understand insurance products, pricing factors, and coverage requirements.

== Brands ==
Quote.com owns and operates a portfolio of consumer brands in the insurance, finance, and legal categories. A team of licensed insurance agents, financial advisors, attorneys, and other credentialed professionals ensures that consumers have the information needed to compare options and make informed financial decisions.

Some of the brands include:

- AutoInsurance.org
- QuickQuote.com
- FreeAdvice.com
- Clearsurance.com
- ExpertInsuranceReviews.com

== Partners ==
Quote.com works with insurance carriers, agencies, and insurance marketplaces to provide consumers with access to multiple coverage options through its quote comparison tools. Through these partnerships, users can compare rates and coverage information across a range of insurance products, including auto, home, renters, life, health, pet, business, motorcycle, and Medicare insurance. The company's network of providers and distribution partners supports its nationwide operations across all 50 states and Washington, D.C.
