= Lycos =

Search engine and web portal

Lycos, Inc.

- A screenshot of Lycos.com as of 2015
- Company type: Subsidiary
- Website type: Search engine and web portal
- Available in: Multilingual
- Founded: May 1994; 32 years ago Pittsburgh, Pennsylvania, U.S.
- Headquarters: Waltham, Massachusetts, United States
- Founder: Michael Loren Mauldin
- Parent: Brightcom Group
- Website: www.lycos.com
- Registration: Optional
- Launched: April 13, 1995; 31 years ago
- Current status: Active

Lycos, Inc. (stylized as LYCOS), a subsidiary of Brightcom Group, offers a search engine, web portal, chat service, domain name registration service, and email client. It was established in 1994 as a university spin-off from Carnegie Mellon University.

Defunct external sites previously operated by Lycos included Angelfire, Chickmail, Chickpages, Estromail, Estropages, Gamesville, GetRelevant.com, Gurlmail, Gurlpages, Hotbot, InsiderInfo, Matchmaker.com, Quote.com and RagingBull.com, Tripod, Weather Zombie, Webon, Webmonkey, WhoWhere.com, and Wired.com.

The name "Lycos" is short for "Lycosidae", which is Latin for "wolf spider".

== History ==
Lycos began in May 1994 as a research project by Michael Loren Mauldin of Carnegie Mellon University. Lycos was funded with approximately US$2 million in venture capital funding from CMGI.

Bob Davis became the CEO and first employee of the new company in 1995. He concentrated on building the company into an advertising-supported web portal, led by Bill Townsend.

In April 1996, the company completed the fastest initial public offering from inception to offering in NASDAQ history, ending its first day of trading with a market value of $300 million. It also became the first search engine to become a public company, before rivals Yahoo! and Excite.

In May 1997, the company formed Lycos Europe, a joint venture with Bertelsmann. Lycos began offering e-mail services in October 1997. That year, it became one of the first profitable Internet businesses.

=== Acquisitions (1998-1999) ===
In February 1998, Lycos acquired Tripod.com for $58 million. In March 1998, Lycos paid $4 million for a 9% stake in GlobeComm, which powered its free email service. In August 1998, Lycos acquired WhoWhere for $133 million in stock. In October 1998, the company acquired the digital assets of Wired for $83 million in stock after the print version of the magazine was sold to Advance Magazine Publishers. The deal also included Hotbot and WebMonkey, which was shut in 2004 but relaunched in 2008. In September 1999, the company acquired Quote.com for $78 million in stock. In November 1999, Lycos acquired Gamesville for $207 million in stock.

=== Height of popularity (1999) ===
In a brief surge in April 1999, the website was visited by 52% of all internet users, which was more than the reach of Yahoo. Lycos launched an internet radio service that month.

The company abandoned its internal search technology and outsourced search technology to AlltheWeb that year.

The company formed Lycos Asia, a $50 million joint venture with Singtel, in December 1999. In June 2000, Lycos acquired Matchmaker.com for $44 million in cash. it was sold in February 2006. In July 2000, Lycos began using Windows 2000 software and Intel processors to power its platform.

Lycos was acquired by Terra Networks, a division of Telefónica, for $12.5 billion in October 2000, near the peak of the dot-com bubble. It was renamed Terra Lycos. In January 2001, the company acquired RagingBull.com. In October 2002, the company acquired GetRelevant.

=== Decline ===
In October 2004, Terra sold Lycos to Daum Communications Corporation, now Kakao, for $95.4 million in cash, less than 2% of Terra's initial multibillion-dollar investment.

The company sold the digital assets of Wired to Condé Nast Publications in June 2006. It was remerged with the print version of the magazine.

In February 2006, Lycos sold Quote.com and RagingBull.com to FT Interactive Data Corporation for $30 million. In March 2006, Lycos introduced phone call services, including video chat, real-time video on demand, and an MP3 player. Lycos introduced Lycos Cinema in November 2006.

Lycos Mix was launched in February 2007, allowing users to pull video clips from YouTube, Google Video, Yahoo! Video and MySpace Video and allowed users to create playlists where other users could add video comments and chat in real-time.

Lycos was sold for $36 million in August 2010 to Ybrant Digital, an Internet marketing company based in Hyderabad, India. Ybrant Digital paid $20 million at signing and there was a legal dispute over magnitude of the second installment between Ybrant and Daum. In 2018, a New York court ruled in favor of Daum and appointed Daum (by then merged with Kakao) as receiver of Ybrant's 56% ownership interest in Lycos.

In May 2012, Rob Balazy was named CEO. Lycos announced the Band and Ring wearable devices in June 2015.

In October 2016, Lycos sold the HotBot.com domain name for $155,000.

The parent company of Lycos, YBrant Digital, was renamed Brightcom Group in May 2018.

Around January 2026, Lycos suffered a significant server outage for Lycos Search, Tripod, and Angelfire, and a message appeared stating that they would be fixing the issue. After the shutdown of the hosting services in April 2026, this message shortly reappeared until April 29.

At the end of April 2026, Tripod and Angelfire were shut down, after a silent end-of-service announcement made on Lycos' website on April 3.

After the shutdown, a new message appeared on April 29, 2026, stating that "Exact Hosting has partnered with Lycos to provide a continuity path for customers whose email services are being discontinued. Visit Exact Hosting for more information."

== See also ==
- List of search engines
- Comparison of search engines
