= Online service provider law =

Online service provider law is a summary and case law tracking page for laws, legal decisions and issues relating to online service providers (OSPs), like the Wikipedia and Internet service providers (ISPs), from the viewpoint of an OSP considering its liability and customer service issues. See Cyber law for broader coverage of the law of cyberspace.

== United States ==
The general liability risk within the United States is low but it's necessary to review the laws and decisions of all other countries because the extraterritorial application of laws to content hosted in the US is a significant concern.

=== Libel, defamation ===
- 1991 Cubby v. CompuServe held that CompuServe wasn't the publisher and granted summary judgment in its favor.
- May 1995 Stratton Oakmont, Inc. v. Prodigy Services Co. decision which held that Prodigy was the publisher, because it could delete messages.
- 1996 Section 230 of the Communications Decency Act (CDA), which states in part that "No provider or user of an interactive computer service shall be treated as the publisher or speaker of any information provided by another information content provider". Note that this portion of the CDA was not struck down and remains law.
- November 1997 Zeran v. AOL The CDA protects AOL even though it repeatedly ignored a defamation complaint.
- April 1998 Blumenthal v. AOL (part of the case against Drudge and AOL) held that the CDA protects AOL for Drudge's writing that Blumenthal, an assistant to the US President, had a spousal abuse background (retracted in two days) even though it paid Drudge US$3,000 a month for his columns, had editorial control and might well have been liable if it was not an online publication .
- Lunney v. Prodigy Services Co. 94 N.Y.2d 242 (1999) held that internet chatroom provider was not considered a publisher of defamatory material posted from an impostor account due to Prodigy's passive role.
- 2003 Carafano v. Metrosplash.com (the Star Trek actress case) . Providing multiple choice options in forms doesn't invalidate CDA immunity.

Immunity under Section 230 requires that: (1) the defendant is a provider or user of an interactive computer service; (2) the cause of action treat the defendant as a publisher or speaker of information; and (3) the information at issue be provided by another information content provider. Zeran, 129 F.3d at 330. Even completely ignoring a complaint has generally been found not to garner liability, so protection appears to be very comprehensive, though it still doesn't stop people from trying.

In 2002, the California Court of Appeal held that CDA Section 230 does not apply to distributor liability, meaning that a defendant who had notice of a defamatory statement must stop publishing it or face liability. Barrett v. Rosenthal, 114 Cal. App.4th 1379 (2002). The California Supreme Court, in a unanimous decision overturned, holding that Rosenthal was a "user of interactive computer services" and therefore immune from liability under Section 230. See also Grace v. eBay, Inc., 2004 WL 1632047 (Cal. Ct. App. Jul. 22, 2004) (no immunity against liability for a distributor of information who knew or had reason to know that the information was defamatory). Grace v. eBay was resolved without an opinion. The lower courts in Grace and Barrett had reached opposite conclusions when they were appealed to the California Supreme Court. In taking these cases, it was deciding to uphold or reverse Blumenthal v. AOL. Blumenthal, noted the conference report comment that the clear intent of the CDA was to overrule the state decision in Stratton-Oakmont v. Prodigy and opined that accepting distributor liability would expose them to liability that Congress had clearly intended to protect them from.

=== Patent, trademark, right of publicity, trade secret ===
- Communications Decency Act

The CDA does not "limit or expand any law pertaining to intellectual property" 47 U.S.C. Section 230(e)(2); see also Gucci America, Inc. v. Hall & Associates, 135 F. Supp. 2d 409 (S.D.N.Y. 2001) (no immunity for contributory liability for trademark infringement); Perfect 10, Inc. v CCBill LLC (No. CV 02-7624 LGB) (C.D. Cal. 22 June 2004) (state right of publicity claim is not covered by Section 230); but see Carafano v. Metrosplash.com, Inc., 339 F.3d 1119 (9th Cir. 2003) (dismissing, inter alia, right of publicity claim under Section 230 without discussion).

Courts have not yet addressed whether a state law trade secret claim is a "law pertaining to intellectual property."

=== Copyright ===
- Communications Decency Act
- Online Copyright Infringement Liability Limitation Act (part of the DMCA)
- List of leading legal cases in copyright law

The OCILLA can provide a safe harbor for OSPs who comply with its requirements. As noted above, CDA Section 230 does not provide protection against a copyright claim.

If the OSP does not fall under OCILLA's safe harbor, it still may be protected. In Religious Technology Center v. Netcom On-Line Communication Services, Inc., 907 F. Supp. 1361 (N. D. Cal. 1995), an internet services provider who merely transmitted material that infringed the plaintiff’s copyright was held not liable. See also CoStar Group, Inc. v. LoopNet, Inc., 373 F.3d 544 (4th Cir., 2004)

=== Security ===
The Computer Fraud and Abuse Act is one US law covering this area.

== Australia ==
=== Defamation ===
Gutnick v Dow Jones US publisher, liable in Australia under the relatively new lex loci delicti rule (where the harm happens).

=== Copyright ===
- Duration of copyright in Australia

== United Kingdom ==
=== Defamation ===
The permanent nature of the internet and the fact that regulation of what people post is almost impossible to maintain can lead to many dangerous situations. And when these slanderous accusations cause damage to an injured party, they can be classified as Online Defamation.

The first case considering online defamation was in Godfrey v. Demon Internet Service [1999] 4 All ER 342, [2001] QB 201 (QBD). An anonymous poster impersonated a physics lecturer and posted a defamatory comments on a Usenet newsgroup. The posting remained online for several weeks even after the real lecturer made requests to take it down. The issue was whether the service provider had 'published' the posting. The Court held "ISPs do not participate in the process of publication as such but merely act as facilitators...". However, in Godfrey, it was held that the ISP could be held liable at common law if it had been notified of a defamatory posting, and was so rendered responsible for publication from that moment onwards.

The later case of Bunt v. Tilley & Ors [2006] EWHC 407 (QB), concerned a claim for alleged defamation against the ISPs who hosted websites containing defamatory material. The court found that the ISPs were merely passive facilitators rather than actively procuring the commission of the tort like a publisher. No defamation was ever proven.

As of 1 January 2014, changes to UK defamation laws will come into force, with the Defamation Act 2013 and accompanying Defamation (Operators of Websites) Regulations 2013. in which operators of web sites are not liable for defamation claims against them for user generated content (e.g. comments on a forum posted by users) provided they take certain actions within reasonable timeframes when notified of the offending content. Where the author cannot be contacted, (e.g. if the posting is anonymous or the user has supplied obviously bogus contact details), the website operator must take the content down or they can be liable.

Section 5 of the Defamation Act 2013 (c.26) provides a defence for the operator of a website where a defamation action is brought in respect of a statement posted on that website if it was not the operator who posted the statement. The defence can be defeated if the claimant can show that it was not possible for them to identify the person posting the statement, the claimant gave the operator a notice of complaint in relation to that statement and the operator did not respond to the notice of complaint in accordance with these regulations.

=== Copyright ===
According to section 1 of the Copyright, Designs and Patents Act 1988, a work is eligible for copyright protection if it is:

"1 Copyright and copyright works

(1) Copyright is a property right which subsists in accordance with this Part in the following descriptions of work?
(a) original literary, dramatic, musical or artistic works,
(b) sound recordings, films or broadcasts, and
(c) the typographical arrangement of published editions.
(2) In this Part "copyright work" means a work of any of those descriptions in which copyright subsists.
(3) Copyright does not subsist in a work unless the requirements of this Part with respect to qualification for copyright protection are met (see section 153 and the provisions referred to there)."

According to the UK Patent Office website, the definition of 'original' is the following:

"A work can only be original if it is the result of independent creative effort. It will not be original if it has been copied from something that already exists. If it is similar to something that already exists but there has been no copying from the existing work either directly or indirectly, then it may be original.

The term 'original' also involves a test of substantiality - literary, dramatic, musical and artistic works will not be original if there has not been sufficient skill and labour expended in their creation. But, sometimes significant investment of resources without significant intellectual input can still count as sufficient skill and labour.

Ultimately, only the courts can decide whether something is original, but there is much case law indicating, for example, that names and titles do not have sufficient substantiality to be original and that, where an existing work is widely known, it will be difficult to convince a court that there has been no copying if your work is very similar or identical.

Sound recordings, films and published editions do not have to be original but they will not be new copyright works if they have been copied from existing sound recordings, films and published editions.

Broadcasts do not have to be original, but there will be no copyright, if, or to the extent that, they infringe copyright in another broadcast."

The other relevant portion of the Act in question is section 153:

"153 Qualification for copyright protection
(1) Copyright does not subsist in a work unless the qualification requirements of this Chapter are satisfied as regards?
(a) the author (see section 154), or
(b) the country in which the work was first published (see section 155), or
(c) in the case of a broadcast, the country from which the broadcast was made (see section 156).
(2) Subsection (1) does not apply in relation to Crown copyright or Parliamentary copyright (see sections 163 to 166B) or to copyright subsisting by virtue of section 168 (copyright of certain international organisations).
(3) If the qualification requirements of this Chapter, or section 163, 165 or 168, are once satisfied in respect of a work, copyright does not cease to subsist by reason of any subsequent event."

This section controls the nationality and country of origin requirements for copyright. It is roughly comparable with US law, since both countries are signatories to the Berne Convention.

==== Crown copyright ====
Photographs created before 1 June 1957 have a 50-year copyright period, as do other works except engravings. Photographs published before August 1989 also have a 50-year copyright period.

- flowchart for determining Crown Copyright status of literary, dramatic and musical works (PDF)
- flowchart for determining Crown Copyright status of artistic works (PDF)

== Japan ==
On 27 May 2002, so-called Provider Liability Limitation Law (プロバイダ責任法 or プロバイダ責任制限法) was enacted. It is said that the major purpose of the law is to limit the liability of ISPs, administrators and system operators of bulletin boards, hosting services, and others. The law covers copyright violation, defamation, and obscenity among other things. Regarding those contents that have to be removed, the law holds that the service providers cannot be held liable, unless 1) they have the technological means to remove the content, and either 2-a) they have the knowledge of the illegal content, or 2-b) they could reasonably have gotten to know it. It also specifies circumstances under which service providers may offer personal information of a user to another.

Major cases preceding the law include Niftyserve Case, in which a system operator/ moderator of an online forum was found to be liable for not removing a series of defamatory postings. The system operator was not requested by the defamed participant to remove the content, but had the knowledge of the content. The court found it to be an important ground for the liability.

== Canada ==
In Canada, there is no legislation addressing liability for online service providers; and few cases.

In Carter v. BC Federation of Foster Parents Association, 2004 BCSC 137, a case on a service provider's liability for an anonymous forum posting, the Court cited the US cases of Cubby v. Compuserve and Lunney v. Prodigy Services with approval for its editorial control test.

Where a defamatory statement is found, a service provider may avail themselves to a defence of innocent dissemination - as set out in the English case of Vizetelly v. Mudie’s Select Library Ltd., [1900] 2 Q.B. 17.

== Elsewhere ==
=== Copyright ===
- copyright outside the UK has some guidance.
- Bromberg Sunstein guidance on international copyright (archive link, was dead)
- ISP Liability in the Russian Federation, see: Stefan Labesius, Kontent i Pravo v. Masterhost, Presidium of the Supreme Arbitration Court of the Russian Federation, Judgment of 23 December 2008, Nr. 10962/08, Translation and Comment, 1 (2010) JIPITEC 179, para. 1
