= Doe v. MySpace, Inc. =

Doe v. MySpace Inc.
- Court: United States Court of Appeals for the Fifth Circuit
- Full case name: Jane Doe, Individually and as next friend of Julie Doe, a minor v. MySpace, Inc.; News Corporation
- Decided: May 16, 2008
- Citation: 528 F.3d 413 (5th Cir. 2008)

Case history
- Prior history: 474 F. Supp. 2d 843 (W.D. Tex. 2007)

Holding
- Section 230 of the Communications Decency Act shields an Internet service provider from legal liability for criminal offenses committed by its users.

Court membership
- Judges sitting: William Lockhart Garwood, Edith Brown Clement, Jennifer Walker Elrod

Case opinions
- Majority: Clement, joined by Garwood, Elrod

Laws applied
- Section 230 of the Communications Decency Act

Doe v. MySpace, Inc., 528 F.3d 413 (2008), is a Fifth Circuit Court of Appeals ruling that MySpace was immune under Section 230 of the Communications Decency Act of 1996 from liability for a sexual assault of a minor that arose from posts on the MySpace platform.

== Facts ==
In 2005, the plaintiff known pseudonymously as Julie Doe, then age thirteen, lied about her age, claimed to be eighteen years old, and created a profile on MySpace.com. In April 2006, nineteen-year-old Pete Solis contacted Julie through her MySpace page. The two parties communicated offline and formed a relationship. They met in person on May 12, 2006, and Solis sexually assaulted Julie at this meeting. On May 13, 2006, Julie's mother called the police in Austin, Texas to report the sexual assault of her daughter.

Julie and her mother sued MySpace and its parent company, News Corp., for negligence, fraud, and negligent misrepresentation. (They also sued Solis for intentional infliction of emotional distress in a separate proceeding.) The plaintiffs first filed a lawsuit in Texas state court (their home state) and also in Bronx County, New York (near the News. Corp headquarters). After various arguments about the proper venue for the case, it was ultimately heard at the United States District Court for the Western District of Texas.

== District court ruling ==
The district court dismissed the plaintiffs' claim of negligence, as MySpace was shielded from such claims when arising from the behavior of third-party users by Section 230 of the Communications Decency Act, as well as Texas common law.

Both parties conceded that MySpace was an "interactive computer service" as defined by Section 230. The district court held that Congress intended that provision to encourage websites to create forums for people to exchange thoughts and ideas by protecting interactive computer services from potential liability for each post submitted by their users. This intent was upheld by circuit court precedents including Carafano v. Metrosplash.com and Zeran v. America Online, Inc., thus shielding MySpace from legal liability for the actions of its users.

In the words of the district court:

"no provider or user of an interactive computer service shall be held liable on account of -- (A) any action voluntarily taken in good faith to restrict access to or availability of material that the provider or user-considers to be obscene, lewd, lascivious, filthy, excessively violent, harassing, or otherwise objectionable..."

Thus, MySpace could not be considered the publisher of the content created by its users, and should not accept the responsibility of that role. The district court also held that the plaintiffs failed to make a compelling claim that MySpace had committed fraud or engaged in negligent misrepresentation. This was due to the requirements of Texas state law that a duty of care be established and that evidence of a breach of that duty must be presented in court. The court held that a party has "no legal duty to protect another from the criminal acts of a third person or control the conduct of another." Thus, the court found that the plaintiffs had failed to state a claim for negligence because MySpace had no duty to protect its user Julie Doe from Solis's criminal sexual assault.

== Appeals court ruling ==
Julie Doe and her mother appealed the district court ruling on their negligence claim, arguing that Section 230 is both inapplicable regarding criminal matters and does not fully shield MySpace from taking reasonable steps to ensure the safety of its underage users. The plaintiffs also argued that even though MySpace was not specifically a publisher under the law, it still had enough influence in designing the "virtual world" of its site that it bore some responsibility for the illegal behavior of its users.

On May 16, 2008, the Fifth Circuit Court of Appeals affirmed the district court ruling that Section 230 shielded MySpace from the plaintiffs' claims. The circuit court added that per Green v. America Online, Inc., Section 230 protects against claims of "failure to protect" the users of an online service. The court held that Section 230 offers immunity for online services "broadly in all cases arising from the publication of user-generated content."

While Julie Doe and her mother had a solid case against the offender Pete Solis, the circuit court rejected their claim that MySpace was responsible for the in-person meeting that led to the sexual assault, and also rejected their claim that MySpace should have designed safety procedures for minors, particularly because that claim had not been made at the district court. Thus, the plaintiffs' claim was entirely about the content of the messages between the two parties, and content is covered under Section 230, while prosecution of the crime committed by Solis could be handled in a separate criminal trial. The court also held that MySpace had not committed negligence by failing to install safeguards for the protection of its underage users.

Pete Solis was charged with felony sexual assault of a minor and indicted in criminal court. Julie Doe and her mother attempted to appeal the Fifth Circuit ruling in favor of MySpace to the Supreme Court of the United States, but certiorari was denied.

== Impact ==
While previous rulings had clarified that Section 230 absolved service providers from legal liability for the speech-related offenses committed by their third-party users, this ruling was the first to address liability for criminal offenses committed by users outside of the website in question, and found that Section 230 covers that type of transgression as well. However, there was some criticism of the ruling for allowing MySpace to skirt responsibility for the millions of underage users of its platform and the indecency to which they were exposed.
