= Mable Amuron =

Mable Barbara Amuron is a Ugandan human rights defender, writer, blogger and researcher specializing in digital rights. She works for an organization called Thraets where she writes about different topics and research findings.

The organization is a civic tech research lab that works at the intersection of democratic election processes and the use of emerging technology in managing disinformation and misinformation to protect digital rights. The organization has participated in the Digital Democracy Initiative, a to safeguard digital human rights funded by the Danish Ministry of Foreign Affairs and the European Union.

== Career ==
In her writing career, Mable Amuron contributes to research analysis on Tech-Facilitated Gender-Based Violence, Surveillance and Digital Rights. As part of her advocacy campaigns, she advises self censorship from digital spaces to help in the recovery process for online violence survivors.

Amuron is a script writer, blogger and researcher on digital human rights.

Amuron was the writer and voice over actor for an animation titled Chebet that won Best Animation at the 2018 Uganda Film Festival Awards Awards. She was the Editorial Co-ordinator for the Ibua Journal and has also worked as a Copywriter.

She has a Bachelor's Degree in Petroleum Geoscience and Production from Makerere University and certificate in Data Science with Machine Learning from Refactory Academy.

== Personal life ==
Amuron lives in Kampala, Uganda. Amuron also has a blog called Growing Pains (https://amuron.com), where she writes about growing up, life, and mental health. She is a big advocate for reading all things African.

== See also ==
- Judith Adong
- Harriet Anena
- Dilman Dila
- Lillian Aujo
