= Laurence Godfrey =

Laurence or Lawrence Godfrey may refer to:

- Laurence Godfrey (physicist) (born 1952), physicist, expert evidence in Internet-related litigation and litigant in Godfrey v. Demon
- Larry Godfrey (Laurence Paul Godfrey, born 1976), Olympic archer
- Lawrence Godfrey (Shortland Street)
