= Mark Shannon =

Mark Shannon (born Mark Jackson Fullerton; August 4, 1951 – May 8, 2010) was a long-time conservative radio personality who lived in Edmond, Oklahoma.

Shannon was born in Lincoln, Nebraska where he lived until graduating high school in 1969. After high school, he joined the U.S. Navy where he was an air traffic controller, training and working at bases in the Philippines, Brunswick, Georgia, and Virginia Beach.

In June 1973, after being discharged from the Navy, and while waiting to transfer to civilian air traffic control, Shannon attended broadcasting school in Minneapolis where he graduated "with honors". He began his first radio job in April 1974 at KUBC 580am, in Montrose, Colorado. Shannon used the air name Mark Stone while there. He left the station after six months and began at KWSL in Sioux City, Iowa. During his career, he also worked for stations in Amarillo, Texas, Philadelphia, Pittsburgh, and Oklahoma City.

In 1995, Shannon reported on false information posted on AOL related to the Oklahoma City bombing, provoking the harassment of Kenneth M. Zeran, a Seattle resident. Zeran subsequently sued Diamond Broadcasting, Shannon's employer at the time, alleging defamation, false light invasion of privacy, and intentional infliction of emotional distress. The court found in favor of the defendant.

After being laid off in 2000, Shannon took time off from radio, doing substitute teaching, and working at a local golf course. He returned to Oklahoma City after a stint on AM news/talk station WLAC in Nashville.

In October 2000, Shannon was diagnosed with chronic lymphocytic leukemia, a slowly progressing cancer of the blood. He died on May 8, 2010, at his home in Edmond, Oklahoma with his wife Kris by his side.
