= Lunney v. Prodigy Services Co. =

- Court: New York Court of Appeals
- Full case name: Alexander G. Lunney v. Prodigy Services Company, et al.
- Decided: December 2 1999
- Citation: 723 N.E.2d 539; 94 N.Y.2d 242; 701 N.Y.S.2d 684

Case history
- Prior history: Defendant's motion for summary judgment denied, Sup. Ct. Westchester Cty., July 2, 1997; renewed motion for summary judgment denied, Sup. Ct., Jan. 14, 1998; rev'd, 250 A.D.2d 230 (1999)
- Subsequent history: Cert. denied, 529 U.S. 1098 (2000)

Holding
- An internet chatroom provider could not be considered the publisher of defamatory material posted by an imposter account because of its passive role in monitoring the chatrooms. Appellate Division affirmed.

Court membership
- Chief judge: Judith S. Kaye
- Associate judges: Joseph W. Bellacosa, George Bundy Smith, Howard A. Levine, Carmen Beauchamp Ciparick, Richard C. Wesley, Albert M. Rosenblatt

Case opinions
- Majority: Rosenblatt, joined by Kaye, Smith, Levine, Ciparick, Wesley
- Bellacosa took no part in the consideration or decision of the case.

Lunney v. Prodigy Services Co., 94 N.Y.2d 242 (1999) is a leading U.S. law case on liability of internet service providers for defamation. The court held that Prodigy, an internet chatroom provider, was not considered a publisher of defamatory material posted from an imposter account due to its passive role in monitoring the chatrooms.
