= Godfrey v Demon Internet Service =

UK court case concerning liability of internet service providers

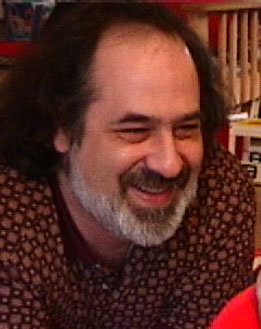
- Court: High Court, Queen's Bench Division
- Citation: [1999] 4 All ER 342, [2001] QB 201

Keywords
- Libel

Godfrey v Demon Internet Service [2001] QB 201 was a landmark court case in the United Kingdom concerning online defamation and the liability of Internet service providers.

== Facts ==
Laurence Godfrey—a physics lecturer—learned that someone had posted a message to the Usenet discussion group soc.culture.thai. That message—sent by an unknown source—had been forged to appear to have been sent by Dr. Godfrey.

On 17 January 1997 Godfrey contacted Demon Internet, to inform them of the forged message and ask that it be deleted from Demon Internet's Usenet news server. Demon Internet declined to remove the message, which remained on its servers for ten additional days, at which time it was automatically deleted along with all other old messages.

Godfrey sued for libel, citing Demon's failure to remove the forged message at the time of his initial complaint.

== Judgment ==
Ruling on a pre-trial motion, the court found that an Internet service provider can be sued for libel, and that any transmission by a service provider of a defamatory posting constituted a publication under defamation law. Demon thereafter entered into an out-of-court settlement that paid Godfrey £15,000 plus £250,000 for his legal expenses.

There have since appeared several misrepresentations of the second of the two interlocutory judgments of Mr. Justice Morland in the (first) Godfrey v. Demon action. Having struck out the core of Demon's defence in his first judgment, Morland J considered a further application by the defendant (Demon) to amend its defence to include a large number of extracts from other internet postings that the defendant sought to claim were Laurence Godfrey's words. It is emphasised that the defendant merely alleged that these words were Godfrey's. The judge also makes this clear in his judgment by listing all the material in question under the headings “postings allegedly made by the Plaintiff about Thailand”

The judge described as "provocative" those words alleged by the defendant to have been posted by Godfrey. At that time Godfrey had had no opportunity to admit or deny these allegations, since they were made by way of proposed amendments to the defence. However, in the event these allegations were not proven and at the conclusion of the case an agreed statement was made in open court in which it was stated (inter alia): “Demon is also here today ... to apologise to Dr Godfrey for not removing the postings from its servers and for alleging in his defence that Dr Godfrey had deliberately provoked them, a contention which it now withdraws”.

== Significance ==
Laurence Godfrey commented that he was happy with the settlement. Godfrey was subsequently the plaintiff in a variety of other internet-based libel suits.

Following Godfrey v Demon, ISPs began to remove defamatory statements as soon as they received a complaint about them. Media lawyers have described the case's resultant restriction on freedom of expression as "disproportionate" and suggested that it may not survive a challenge under the Human Rights Act.
