= Green v. America Online, Inc. =

- Court: United States Court of Appeals for the Third Circuit
- Full case name: Green v. America Online, Inc. and John Does 1 & 2
- Argued: November 15, 2002
- Decided: January 16, 2003
- Citation: 318 F.3d 465

Case history
- Procedural history: Affirmed holding from (D.N.J. 2001)

Holding
- Section 230 of the Communications Decency Act protects Internet service providers from liability for tort offenses committed by their users.

Court membership
- Judges sitting: Dolores Sloviter, Marjorie Rendell, Max Rosenn

Case opinions
- Majority: Max Rosenn

Laws applied
- Section 230 of the Communications Decency Act

Green v. America Online, Inc., 318 F.3d 465 (2003), was a case of the United States Court of Appeals for the Third Circuit, concerning the protections granted to Internet service providers from legal liability for tort offenses committed by their users.

== Background ==
John Green was a regular participant in America Online (AOL) message boards. While perusing a chat room called "Romance - New Jersey over 30," Green received a message from an anonymous user that transmitted a "punter" computer virus to his computer, causing a blue screen of death and causing him to lose five hours of work time. Green claimed that the anonymous user who infected his computer joined with a second anonymous user to brag about the damage to Green's computer and make false statements about his sexuality, causing defamation and emotional distress.

Green copied chat transcripts, sent them to AOL, and tried to claim $400 in damages for lost computer time and unspecified monetary damages against the two anonymous users, known only as John Doe 1 and John Doe 2. Green also claimed that AOL's user agreement was a violation of his First Amendment rights because he was required to accept the agreement with no room for negotiation.

== Opinion of the court ==
The case began at the U.S. District Court for New Jersey, which ruled against Green. He then appealed to the Third Circuit. The circuit court affirmed the lower court ruling, reasoning that Green may have been able to file a tort claim against the John Does for both damage to his computer and emotional distress, but could not do so against AOL. The offending posts were found to be third-party "information" under Section 230, for which the service provider has no legal liability. Per precedent in Zeran v. America Online, an Internet service provider is immune from tort claims arising from the behavior of its users.

The circuit court also held that as a passive provider of a platform for third-party speech, AOL could not be considered the publisher of the content or accept the responsibilities of that role. The court also rejected Green's claim that the AOL user agreement violated his First Amendment rights because AOL is a private company and users like Green pay voluntarily to use the service.

Green attempted to appeal to the United States Supreme Court, but his request for certiorari was denied.

== Impact ==
While previous rulings had clarified that Section 230 absolved service providers from legal liability for the speech-related offenses committed by their third-party users, this ruling addressed liability for tort offenses committed by users and found that Section 230 covers that type of transgression as well. While infecting someone's computer with a virus or malware can be a cause of legal action for compensatory and punitive damages, Green would have to pursue such a case against the unknown John Does and not against the hosting service, AOL.
