= Gennady Kuzmin (diplomat) =

Russian diplomat

Gennady Vladimirovich Kuzmin (Russian: Геннадий Владимирович Кузьмин) is a Russian diplomat, serving as of 2022 as Deputy Permanent Representative of the Mission of Russia to the United Nations. He is best known for a resolution adopted by the eleventh emergency special session of the United Nations General Assembly on 7 April 2022, in which he took part to defend Russia from getting suspended from the United Nations Human Rights Council. He has also stated that the resolution was "politically motivated".
