= Laurence Godfrey (physicist) =

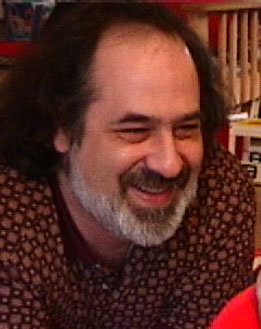
- Laurence Godfrey in year 2000
- Born: November 21, 1952 (age 73); London, England
- Occupations: Physicist and consultant
- Children: Waylan Godfrey

Dr. Laurence Godfrey (born 21 November 1952) was educated at the independent The Haberdashers' Aske's Boys' School, at Westfield College, University of London (BSc Physics, first class honours, 1975) and at University College London (PhD, High Energy Nuclear Physics, 1982). He established a legal precedent for libel on Usenet, in the landmark Godfrey v Demon Internet Service case. He lives in France with his son Waylan and is unmarried. He is self-employed inter alia as an expert witness, consultant and technical adviser in Internet-related litigation.

== History ==
In 1993 he and CERN colleague Phillip Hallam-Baker became immersed in a very public dispute on Usenet, which culminated in a libel action (settled out of court in Godfrey's favour).

Godfrey was a regular and controversial presence to the Usenet newsgroups soc.culture.british, soc.culture.canada, soc.culture.german and soc.culture.thai. His main topics of discourse there were the perceived and real shortcomings of the inhabitants of those countries.

He launched a series of court cases including Godfrey v Demon Internet Service. Godfrey has used Britain's strict libel laws to bring successful libel actions, suing in British courts a number of organizations based in other countries, including Cornell University and the University of Minnesota.

== Libel cases ==
- 1995, Godfrey v. Hallam-Baker
- 1997, Godfrey v. Demon Internet
- 1998, Godfrey v. Cornell University/Dolenga
- 1998, Godfrey v. University of Minnesota/Starnet/Quanchairut
- 1998, Godfrey v. Melbourne PC Users Group
- 1999, Godfrey v. Granite Internet
- (unknown) Godfrey v. New Zealand TeleCom
- (unknown) Godfrey v. Toronto Star
