= Zeran v. America Online, Inc. =

1997 United States court case

- Court: United States Court of Appeals for the Fourth Circuit
- Full case name: Kenneth M. Zeran v. America Online, Incorporated
- Argued: October 2, 1997
- Decided: November 12, 1997
- Citation: 129 F.3d 327 (4th Cir. 1997)

Case history
- Prior history: 958 F.Supp. 1124 (E.D. Va. 1997)
- Subsequent history: Cert. denied, 524 U.S. 937 (1998),

Holding
- Section 230 of the Communications Decency Act protects Internet service providers from liability for tort offenses committed by their users.

Court membership
- Judges sitting: J. Harvie Wilkinson III, Donald S. Russell, Terrence Boyle (E.D.N.C.)

Case opinions
- Majority: Wilkinson, joined by Russell, Boyle

Laws applied
- Section 230 of the Communications Decency Act

Zeran v. America Online, Inc., 129 F.3d 327 (4th Cir. 1997), is a case in which the United States Court of Appeals for the Fourth Circuit determined the immunity of Internet service providers for wrongs committed by their users under Section 230 of the Communications Decency Act. The statute states that "No provider or user of an interactive computer service shall be treated as the publisher or speaker of any information provided by another information content provider."

The Fourth Circuit held that plaintiff Kenneth Zeran's claims of malfeasance by America Online were barred by the statute, holding that Section 230 "creates a federal immunity to any cause of action that would make service providers liable for information originating with a third-party user of the service."

== Facts ==
On April 25, 1995, six days after the Oklahoma City bombing, a message was anonymously posted on the America Online (AOL) "Michigan Military Movement" bulletin board advertising items with slogans glorifying the bombing of the Alfred P. Murrah Federal Building. These items included slogans such as, "Visit Oklahoma ... It's a BLAST!!!", "Putting the kids to bed ... Oklahoma 1995", and "McVeigh for President 1996". Persons interested in making a purchase were instructed to call the plaintiff, Kenneth Zeran, whose home phone number was posted in the message but who had neither posted the message nor had anything to do with its content. Shortly after the posting of the message, Zeran began receiving a barrage of threatening calls. He contacted AOL to have the message removed, which they soon did.

After the removal of the message, however, another anonymously posted advertisement stated that the shirts had "SOLD OUT" and that items with new slogans had been made available. The new shirts included slogans such as "Forget the rescue, let the maggots take over—Oklahoma 1995", and "Finally a day care center that keeps the kids quiet—Oklahoma 1995". Zeran again contacted AOL to have the message removed from the bulletin board, which they again did. At this point, per AOL's recommendation, Zeran contacted the Federal Bureau of Investigation; however, for the next week, new messages continued to appear.

On May 1, 1995, the number of calls and threats rose to a crescendo when conservative radio personality Mark Shannon read the message on an Oklahoma City radio station, KRXO, then owned by Diamond Broadcasting. At this point, Zeran's house was placed under protective surveillance, and he was unable to use his telephone for his home business, as the threatening calls were coming in approximately every two minutes. This continued until at least May 15, by which time the number of calls fell to approximately 15 per day. In addition to a suit against Diamond Broadcasting, Zeran filed a negligence suit against AOL in April 1996.

== Lower court ruling ==
At the district court for the Eastern District of Virginia Zeran alleged that as a distributor of media content, AOL was "negligent in failing to respond adequately to the bogus notices on its bulletin board after being made aware of their malicious and fraudulent nature." In Cubby, Inc. v. CompuServe Inc., a New York district court had found that "a defendant [who operates an Internet service] could not be held liable for distributing defamatory statements unless it knew or had reason to know of statements." In this case, since AOL did not dispute its knowledge of the defamatory statements, Zeran claimed to have grounds for alleging AOL's participation in the harassment that he had experienced. In response to this claim, AOL argued that Section 230, which was passed in 1996, preempted the New York ruling, which was issued in 1991 and based on that state's law at the time.

The questions at issue in the lower court ruling were determined to be: (1) whether Section 230 preempts a state law negligence claim against an interactive computer service provider ... and (2) whether Section 230 applies to causes of action brought after its effective date, but arising out of events occurring before that date.

=== Preemption of the state negligence claim by Section 230 ===
In analyzing the preemption of the state laws, the court determined that the Supremacy Clause of the U.S. Constitution demands preemption of state laws where they conflict with federal laws. Zeran contended that AOL was a distributor of information, not a publisher, and because Section 230 was targeted specifically at publishers, Zeran alleged that there was not a conflict between the two statutes.

While admitting to some uncertainty regarding the possibility of liability for publishers under the state law, the court concluded that liability for Internet services would have the effect of disincentivizing the filtering of content by third parties. Given the intent of Congress in enacting Section 230, the court found that such laws were in conflict with the "purpose and objectives of congress," and were thus preempted.

=== Retroactive application of Section 230 ===
Zeran's final claim was that even if the state laws are preempted by Section 230, it should not provide immunity to AOL in this case because the messages were posted on the AOL bulletin board before Section 230's enactment. In analyzing this claim, the court used the Landgraf test, which states that "a court must ... determine whether Congress has clearly expressed [a] statute's intended temporal reach."

To this question, the court pointed out that in Section 230, Congress clearly stated that "no cause of action may be brought and no liability may be imposed under any State or local law that is inconsistent with this section." It reasons that since "no cause of action may be brought," the timing of the posting of the message is immaterial, and Section 230 must apply retroactively.

== Appeals Court ruling ==
Zeran appealed the district court ruling to the Fourth Circuit Court of Appeals. After reviewing the proceedings of the lower court, the Fourth Circuit again granted judgment in favor of AOL. In this proceeding, Zeran again claimed a distinction between distributors and publishers, citing Cubby, Inc. v. CompuServe Inc. and Stratton Oakmont, Inc. v. Prodigy Services Co. Such a distinction was made in those rulings, but the court held that Zeran "misapprehends... the significance of that distinction for the legal issue we consider here." In the opinion of the court, distributors are a subset of publishers, and are thus protected under Section 230. In the words of the court, "‍[L]awsuits seeking to hold a service provider liable for its exercise of a publisher's traditional editorial functions—such as deciding whether to publish, withdraw, postpone or alter content—are barred."

Zeran's appeal also challenged the matter of Section 230 applying retroactively. Again the court cited a specific provision of the statute, which states that "No cause of action may be brought and no liability may be imposed under any State or local law that is inconsistent with this section." The court ruled that "Congress clearly expressed its intent that the statute apply to any complaint instituted after its effective date," and that therefore any issue of retroactivity was moot.

After having lost at the district court and the appeals court, Zeran petitioned the United States Supreme Court for a writ of certiorari. On June 22, 1998, the high court declined to hear the case.
