= Stratton Oakmont, Inc. v. Prodigy Services Co. =

1995 decision of the New York Supreme Court

- Court: New York Supreme Court
- Decided: May 24, 1995
- Citation: 23 Media L. Rep. 1794; 1995 WL 323710; 1995 N.Y. Misc. LEXIS 229

Case opinions
- Majority: Stuart L. Ain

Stratton Oakmont, Inc. v. Prodigy Services Co., 23 Media L. Rep. 1794 (N.Y. Sup. Ct. 1995), is a decision of the New York Supreme Court (Note: The New York Supreme Court is not the state's highest court and is primarily a trial court.) holding that online service providers can be liable for the speech of their users. The ruling caused controversy among early supporters of the Internet, including some lawmakers, leading to the passage of Section 230 of the Communications Decency Act in 1996.

== Facts ==
Prodigy, an early online content hosting site, featured a bulletin board called Money Talk on which anonymous persons could post messages about finance and investing. In October 1994, an unidentified user on Money Talk submitted a post claiming that Stratton Oakmont, a securities investment banking firm based in Long Island, New York, and its president Danny Porush had committed criminal and fraudulent acts in connection with a stock IPO. Stratton Oakmont sued Prodigy as well as the unidentified poster for defamation.

== Court ruling ==
Stratton Oakmont argued that Prodigy should be considered a publisher of the defamatory material, and was therefore liable for the postings under the common law definition of defamation. Prodigy requested a dismissal of the complaint, on the grounds that it could not be held liable for the content of postings created by its third-party users. This argument cited the 1991 precedent Cubby, Inc. v. CompuServe Inc., which had found CompuServe, an online service provider, not liable as a publisher of user-generated content.

The Stratton court held that Prodigy was liable as the publisher of the content created by its users because it exercised editorial control over the messages on its bulletin boards in three ways: 1) by posting content guidelines for users; 2) by enforcing those guidelines with "Board Leaders"; and 3) by utilizing screening software designed to remove offensive language. The court's general argument for holding Prodigy liable, distinguishing from the CompuServe case, was that "Prodigy's conscious choice, to gain the benefits of editorial control, has opened it up to a greater liability than CompuServe and other computer networks that make no such choice."

== Impact ==
This case conflicted with the 1991 federal district court decision in Cubby, Inc. v. CompuServe Inc., which had suggested that courts should not consider online service providers to be publishers. In that case, the court held that CompuServe and other website operators should be considered more like a library than a publisher. The important difference between CompuServe and Prodigy for the Stratton court was that Prodigy engaged in content screening and therefore exercised editorial control.

Some federal legislators noticed the contradiction between the two rulings, while Internet enthusiasts found that expecting website operators to accept liability for the speech of third-party users was both untenable and likely to stifle the development of the Internet. Representatives Christopher Cox (R-CA) and Ron Wyden (D-OR) co-authored legislation that would resolve the contradictory precedents on liability while enabling websites and platforms to host speech and exercise editorial control to moderate objectionable content without incurring unlimited liability by doing so. The legislation, originally titled the Internet Freedom and Family Empowerment Act, passed the House of Representatives on August 4, 1995 by a vote of 420–4. Six months later, this bill was added to the Telecommunications Act of 1996 during a House-Senate conference. The conference report including the Cox-Wyden legislation as part of the Communications Decency Act (a subsection of the Telecommunications Act) was then passed by the Senate by a vote of 91–5 on February 1, 1996.

In 1997, the rest of the Communications Decency Act was overturned by the Supreme Court as an unconstitutional speech restriction, but Section 230 was upheld and is still in effect, because it was intended to enable speech rather than restrict it. Section 230 also served to overturn the New York Supreme Court ruling in the Stratton case, as the legislation clarified that website operators and Internet service providers are not to be considered "publishers" of third-party content and instead merely provide a platform for their users.
