= Cubby, Inc. v. CompuServe Inc. =

1991 US District Court decision

- Court: United States District Court for the Southern District of New York
- Decided: October 29, 1991
- Citation: 776 F. Supp. 135 (S.D.N.Y. 1991)

Holding
- CompuServe was merely a distributor, rather than a publisher of content on its forums, and hence could only be liable for defamation if it knew, or had reason to know, of the defamatory nature of the content.

Court membership
- Judge sitting: Peter K. Leisure

Keywords
- Defamation

Cubby, Inc. v. CompuServe Inc., 776 F. Supp. 135 (S.D.N.Y. 1991), was a 1991 court decision in the United States District Court for the Southern District of New York which held that Internet service providers were subject to traditional defamation law for their hosted content.

The case resolved a claim of libel against CompuServe, an Internet service provider that hosted allegedly defamatory content in one of its forums. The case established a precedent for Internet service provider liability by applying defamation law, originally intended for hard copies of written works, to the Internet medium. The court held that although CompuServe did host defamatory content on its forums, CompuServe was merely a distributor, rather than a publisher, of the content. As a distributor, CompuServe could only be held liable for defamation if it knew, or had reason to know, of the defamatory nature of the content. As CompuServe had made no effort to review the large volume of content on its forums, it could not be held liable for the defamatory content.

The application of traditional defamation law to the Internet context was soon to create controversy in Stratton Oakmont, Inc. v. Prodigy Services Co., in which a service provider was found liable for defamation on the grounds of good-faith attempts to filter objectionable content. In 1996, service providers were granted immunity as publishers and distributors by Section 230 of the Communications Decency Act as an incentive to moderate posted material.

== Facts ==
Cubby, Inc. and Robert Blanchard brought suit against CompuServe Inc. in the United States District Court of the Southern District of New York in 1991 for libel, business disparagement, and unfair competition.

CompuServe, an Internet service provider, hosted an online news forum, the contents of which were generated by a contractor. Cameron Communications, Inc. agreed to "manage, review, create, delete, edit, and otherwise control the contents" of certain forums. Cameron Communications then subcontracted the production of Rumorville USA, a daily newsletter.

In April 1990, Rumorville published defamatory content about a competing online newsletter developed by Blanchard and Cubby, Inc. CompuServe did not dispute the defamatory nature of the content. However, no evidence presented during the trial demonstrated that CompuServe knew, or should have known, of the existence of the defamatory content.

== Legal proceedings ==
Given the established facts, the court determined that a trial was unnecessary and granted summary judgment in favor of CompuServe for all claims.

=== Libel claim ===
Cubby alleged that CompuServe was the publisher of the defamatory statements. A "publisher," in the context of defamation law, is one who publishes or otherwise republishes content. According to federal law and in agreement with New York state law, a publisher who repeats or republishes defamatory content has the same liability as the original publisher of the content.

CompuServe maintained that it was merely a distributor of the published statements. Distributors of defamatory content can only be held liable if they knew, or had reason to know, of the defamatory nature of the content. The court held that "CompuServe has no more editorial control over such a publication [as Rumorville] than does a public library, book store, or newsstand, and it would be no more feasible for CompuServe to examine every publication it carries for potentially defamatory statements than it would be for any other distributor to do so."

=== Business disparagement and unfair competition claims ===
Both the business disparagement claim, which was viewed as trade libel, and the unfair competition claim, based on disparaging remarks, required that CompuServe knew or had reason to know of the defamatory remarks. Again, CompuServe was unaware of the nature of the statements and was thus not held liable.

== Impact ==
Cubby v. CompuServe treated internet intermediaries lacking editorial involvement as distributors, rather than publishers, in the context of defamation law. This decision removed any legal incentive for intermediaries to monitor or screen the content published on their domains.

In 1995, Stratton Oakmont, Inc. v. Prodigy Services Co. further clarified Internet service providers' liabilities. Because Prodigy filtered and occasionally removed offensive content from bulletin boards that it hosted, the court held that Prodigy was a publisher of, and therefore liable for, published defamatory content. As these decisions were not appealed to higher level courts, they were not mandatory precedent. However, the incentive was clear: Internet service providers that chose to remain ignorant of their content were immune from liability, while those that edited content, even in good faith, assumed full publisher liability.

In 1996, Section 230 of the Communications Decency Act granted Internet service providers immunity from liability for content provided by others, with certain exceptions. Section 230 distinguishes between interactive computer services, e.g. Internet service providers, and information content providers, e.g. users who post messages in forums. Interactive computer services are not considered publishers of content from information content providers and cannot be held liable on account of "Good Samaritan" attempts to filter objectionable content.
