= Comparison of feed aggregators =

Comparative list of RSS feed aggregators

The following is a comparison of RSS feed aggregators. E-mail programs and web browsers that have the ability to display RSS feeds are listed, as well as some cloud-based services that offer feed aggregation.

Many BitTorrent clients support RSS feeds for broadcatching.

== Release history ==
| Client | License | First stable release | | Latest stable release |
| Client | License | Date | Version | Latest stable release |
|---|---|---|---|---|
| Akregator | ? | ? | R14.1.2 18 April 2024 | |
| Amarok | ? | ? | 3.3.2 18 January 2026 | |
| AOL Explorer | June 2005 | 1.0 | 1.5 May 2006 | |
| Awasu | February 2003 | 1.0 | 3.3 28 February 2023 | |
| BlogBridge | ? | ? | 6.6.1 26 February 2009 | |
| Bloglines | ? | ? | Merged with NetVibes | |
| Canto | | 0.6.0 | 0.9.8 3 December 2020 | |
| Claws Mail | | 1.0.0 | 4.4.0 9 March 2026 | |
| CommaFeed | Apache-2.0 | ? | ? | 7.2.0 10 July 2026 |
| Cooliris | ? | ? | ? | ? |
| Digg Reader | Proprietary | ? | ? | Discontinued on March 26, 2018 |
| Feed Viewer | Proprietary | April 2006 | 1.0 | Windows 150.2.10 (August 10, 2021) iOS 0.1.39 (August 10, 2021) |
| Feedbin | MIT | March 12, 2013 | ? | (web site, continuous updates) |
| Feedly | Proprietary | 2008 | ? | (web site, continuous updates) |
| Feedreader | Proprietary | ? | ? | |
| Fiper | Proprietary | 2018 | 1.0 | 2.1.5 (28 sept 2025) |
| Flipboard | Proprietary | ? | ? | |
| Flock | Proprietary | November 2, 2007 | 1.0 | 3.5.3.4641 1 February 2011 |
| Gnus | GPL-3.0-or-later | February 1, 1988 | ? | |
| Google Reader | Proprietary | September 17, 2007 | 2.0 | Discontinued on July 1, 2013 |
| HCL Notes (Note: Previously known as IBM Lotus Notes.) | Proprietary | 1989 | 1.0 | 14.0.0 7 December 2023 |
| Inoreader | Proprietary | ? | ? | (web site, continuous updates) |
| iTunes | Proprietary freeware | ? | ? | 12.12.8.2 30 March 2023 |
| Juice | GPL-2.0-or-later | ? | ? | 2.2 11 November 2005 |
| K-Meleon | GPL | November 26, 2000 | 0.2 | 76.4.7 7 April 2023 |
| Kazehakase | GPL-2.0-or-later | January 29, 2003 | ? | 0.5.8 29 September 2009 |
| Liferea | GPL | ? | ? | 2.0 19 August 2026 |
| Maxthon | Proprietary | September 8, 2005 | 1.0.0250 | Windows: 6.1.2.3000 / September 24, 2021; 5 years ago; Android: 6.0.2.3500 / December 9, 2021; 4 years ago; Mac: 5.1.60 / August 27, 2018; 8 years ago; iOS: 6.0.6 / December 14, 2021; 4 years ago; Windows Phone: 2.2.0 / March 30, 2017; 9 years ago; Linux: 1.0.5.3 / September 9, 2014; 12 years ago |
| MediaMonkey | Freemium | ? | ? | Windows: 2024.0.0.3082 / 5 December 2024 |
| Microsoft Office Outlook | Proprietary / Commercial software | 1997 | 97 | 15.0.4517.1509 (January 29, 2013) |
| Mozilla Firefox | MPL-2.0 | September 23, 2002 | 0.1 | Builtin RSS reader was removed in Version 64, Available as an add-on.: Standard: 157.0.1 / October 6, 2026; 4 days ago; ESR 153: 153.4.0esr / September 29, 2026; 11 days ago; ESR 140: 140.17.0esr / September 29, 2026; 11 days ago; ESR 115: 115.42.0esr / September 29, 2026; 11 days ago |
| Mozilla Thunderbird | MPL-2.0 | December 7, 2004 | 1.0 | 157.0.1 1 October 2026 |
| My Yahoo! | ? | ? | ? | Discontinued in Dec. 2024 |
| NetNewsWire | MIT | February 11, 2003 | 1.0 | 6.1.3 29 June 2023 |
| Netscape Browser | Proprietary | May 19, 2005 | 8.0 | 8.1.3 (April 2, 2007; 19 years ago) [±] |
| Netscape Navigator 9 | Proprietary | October 15, 2007 | 9.0 | 9.0.0.6 (February 20, 2008) |
| Netvibes | Proprietary | ? | ? | ? |
| News360 | Proprietary | November 2010 | ? | ? |
| Newsbeuter | MIT | January 16, 2007 | 0.1 | 2.9 19 February 2015 |
| NewsBlur | MIT | October 26, 2010 | 1.0 | 14.3 |
| Newsboat | MIT | September 20, 2017 | 2.10 | 2.45 4 October 2026 |
| NewsFire | Proprietary | ? | ? | 2.0 |
| OmniWeb | Proprietary | March 17, 1995 | 1.0 | 5.11.2 20 July 2012 |
| Pegasus Mail | Proprietary, Donationware | 1990 | ? | 4.91 8 September 2025 |
| Protopage | Proprietary | May 2005 | 1.0 | 11.43 (December 2015) |
| Pulse | ? | ? | ? | ? |
| QuiteRSS | GPL-3.0-or-later | December 2014 | 0.14.0 | 0.19.4 21 April 2020 |
| Rhythmbox | GPL-2.0-or-later | ? | ? | 3.5.0 2 August 2026 |
| RSS Bandit | BSD-3-Clause | March 2003 | 1.0 | 1.9.0.1002 4 July 2010 |
| RSS Guard | GPL-3.0-only | February 4, 2014 | 1.9.9.3 | 5.2.5 20 August 2026 |
| RSSOwl | EPL-1.0 | December 19, 2004 | 1.0 | 2.2.1 30 December 2013 |
| Safari | Proprietary | ? | ? | |
| Sage | MPL-1.1 | ? | ? | 1.5.5 (June 16, 2017) |
| Shiira | BSD-3-Clause | ? | ? | 2.3 11 August 2009 |
| Sleipnir | Proprietary | October 2005 | 2.00 | Windows (Sleipnir 6) 6.5.15 (March 24, 2026; 6 months ago) Windows (Sleipnir 4) 4.8.15 (March 24, 2026; 6 months ago) iOS 5.1.1 (July 31, 2026; 2 months ago) Android 3.8.5 Update 1 (December 23, 2025; 9 months ago) |
| Songbird | GPL | ? | ? | 2.2.0, Build 2453 4 February 2013 |
| The Bat! | Shareware | March 1998 | 1.00 Build 1310 | |
| The Old Reader | Proprietary | June 12, 2012 | ? | Rolling release |
| Tiny Tiny RSS | GPL-3.0-or-later | ? | ? | rolling releases, most recent February 2019 |
| Winamp | Freemium | ? | ? | 5.9.2 Build 10042 (April 26, 2023; 3 years ago) [±] |
| Windows Live Mail | Proprietary | ? | ? | 2012 (v16.4.3528.0331) (November 4, 2014; 11 years ago) [±] |
| Zimbra | Zimbra licensing | March 2006 | 3.5 | 10.1.21 31 August 2026 |
| Zune | Proprietary | ? | ? | 4.08.2345 (August 22, 2011; 15 years ago) [±] |
| Client | License | Date | Version | Latest stable release |
| Client | License | First stable release | | Latest stable release |

Netscape Messenger 9 is a fork of Mozilla Thunderbird and has the same features.

== Operating system support ==
| Client | Windows | macOS | Linux | BSD | Solaris | Android | iOS | Other |
|---|---|---|---|---|---|---|---|---|
| | ? | Yes | Yes | No | No | No | | |
| | Yes | Yes | Yes | Yes | No | No | No | |
| AOL Explorer | No | No | No | | | | | |
| Awasu | Yes | No | No | No | No | No | | |
| BlogBridge | Yes | Yes | Yes | No | No | No | No | No |
| Canto | Yes | No | No | No | No | No | | |
| Claws Mail | Yes | Yes | Yes | Yes | Yes | No | No | |
| CommaFeed | Yes | Yes | Yes | Yes | Yes | Yes | Yes | Client side: every platform with a web browser Server side: every platform with Java |
| Cooliris | Yes | Yes | No | No | No | No | No | No |
| Feed Viewer | Yes | No | No | No | No | Yes | Windows Phone dropped | |
| Feedreader | Yes | No | No | No | No | No | No | No |
| Flock | Yes | Yes | Yes | Yes | No | No | No | No |
| Gnus | Yes | Yes | Yes | Yes | Yes | Yes | No | DOS |
| HCL Notes | Yes | Yes | Yes | No | No | No | No | No |
| Inoreader | Yes | Yes | Yes | No | No | Yes | Yes | No |
| Internet Explorer | No | No | No | No | No | | | |
| iTunes | as Podcasts app | No | No | No | No | No | No | |
| Juice | Yes | No | No | No | No | No | No | |
| K-Meleon | No | No | No | No | No | | | |
| Kazehakase | No | No | No | No | | | | |
| Liferea | No | No | No | No | | | | |
| Apple Mail | No | No | No | No | No | | | |
| Maxthon | No | No | No | No | | | | |
| MediaMonkey | No | No | No | No | No | | | |
Microsoft Office Outlook
| Mozilla Firefox | Yes | Yes | Yes | | | | | |
| Mozilla Thunderbird | Yes | Yes | Yes | Yes | Yes | Yes | Yes | Yes |
| NetNewsWire | No | Yes | No | No | No | No | Yes | |
| Netscape Browser | Yes | No | No | No | No | No | No | |
| Netscape Navigator 9 | Yes | Yes | Yes | No | No | No | No | No |
| Newsbeuter | No | Yes | Yes | Yes | No | No | No | Source code available |
| NewsBlur | Web based | Web based | Web based | Web based | Web based | Yes | Yes | every platform with a web browser |
| Newsboat | No | Yes | Yes | Yes | No | No | No | Source code available |
| NewsFire | No | Yes | No | No | No | No | No | No |
| OmniWeb | No | Yes | No | No | No | No | No | No |
| Pegasus Mail | Yes | No | No | No | No | No | No | No |
| Protopage | Web based | Web based | Web based | Web based | Web based | Dedicated Web App | Dedicated Web App | every platform with a Web browser |
| Pulse | Web based | Web based | Web based | Web based | Web based | Dedicated App | Dedicated App | every platform with a Web browser |
| QuiteRSS | Yes | Yes | Yes | No | No | No | No | Source code available |
| Rhythmbox | No | No | Yes | Yes | Yes | No | No | No |
| RSS Bandit | Yes | No | No | No | No | No | No | No |
| RSS Guard | Yes | Yes | Yes | Yes | No | No | No | Supports OS/2 starting with version 3.9.1. |
| RSSOwl | Yes | Yes | Yes | Yes | Yes | Yes | No | every platform with Java and SWT |
| Safari | Yes | Included | No | No | No | No | No | No |
| Sage | Yes | Yes | Yes | No | No | No | No | No |
| SeaMonkey Mail & Newsgroups | Yes | Yes | Yes | Yes | No | No | No | No |
| Shiira | No | Yes | No | No | No | No | No | No |
| Sleipnir | Yes | No | No | No | No | No | No | No |
| Songbird | Yes | Yes | Yes | No | Yes | No | No | No |
| The Bat! | Yes | No | No | No | No | No | No | No |
| The Old Reader | Web based | Web based | Yes | Web based | Web based | Multiple apps | Multiple apps | Windows Phone, Symbian, WebOS, Firefox OS |
| Tiny Tiny RSS | Yes | Yes | Yes | Yes | Yes | Yes | Yes | every platform with a web browser |
| Winamp | Yes | No | Obsolete | No | No | No | No | No |
| Windows Live Mail | Yes | No | No | No | No | No | No | No |
| Zimbra | Yes | Yes | Yes | Yes | No | No | No | No |
| Zune | Yes | No | No | No | No | No | No | Windows Mobile |
| Client | Windows | macOS | Linux | BSD | Solaris | Android | iOS | Other |

== Web feed and protocol support ==
| Client | feed URI scheme | RSS 0.91 | RSS 1.0 | RSS 2.0 | RSS enclosure | MRSS | Atom | other format | Delta updates | IPv6 | Auto updates | HTTP Basic Auth |
|---|---|---|---|---|---|---|---|---|---|---|---|---|
| Akregator | ? | Yes | Yes | Yes | Yes | Yes | Yes | ? | No | Yes | Yes | Yes |
| Amarok | ? | ? | Yes | Yes | Yes | ? | Yes | ? | No | ? | Yes | ? |
| AOL Explorer | ? | ? | ? | ? | ? | ? | Yes | ? | ? | Yes | ? | ? |
| Awasu | Yes | Yes | Yes | Yes | Yes | Yes | Yes | any XML format (via XSL) | ? | Yes | Yes | ? |
| BlogBridge | ? | ? | ? | ? | ? | ? | ? | ? | ? | ? | ? | ? |
| Canto | ? | Yes | Yes | Yes | Yes | ? | Yes | ? | ? | ? | Yes | ? |
| Claws Mail | ? | No | Yes | Yes | ? | ? | Yes | ? | No | Yes | Yes | ? |
| CommaFeed | Yes | Yes | Yes | Yes | Yes | Yes | Yes | RSS 0.90, RSS 0.92, RSS 0.93, RSS 0.94, Atom 0.3, Atom 1.0 | No | Yes | Yes | No |
| Cooliris | ? | ? | ? | ? | Yes | Yes | ? | ? | No | ? | ? | ? |
| Feed Viewer | ? | Yes | Yes | Yes | Yes | Yes | Yes | CDF, RDF | No | Yes | Yes | ? |
| Feedreader | Yes | Yes | Yes | Yes | Yes | ? | ? | ? | ? | ? | Yes | ? |
| Flock | Yes | ? | ? | ? | ? | Yes | Yes | ? | ? | Yes | Yes | ? |
| Gnus | ? | Yes | Yes | Yes | ? | ? | No | Newsgroups | ? | Yes | No | ? |
| HCL Notes | ? | Yes | Yes | Yes | ? | ? | Yes | ? | ? | Yes | ? | ? |
| Internet Explorer | No | Yes | Yes | Yes | Yes | ? | Yes | Web Slice | Yes | Yes | Yes | ? |
| iTunes | ? | ? | ? | Yes | Yes | ? | Yes | ? | No | ? | Yes | ? |
| Juice | ? | ? | ? | ? | Yes | ? | ? | ? | No | ? | ? | ? |
| K-Meleon | ? | ? | ? | ? | ? | ? | Yes | ? | ? | Yes | ? | ? |
| Kazehakase | ? | ? | ? | ? | ? | ? | ? | LIRS, HINA-DI | ? | Yes | ? | ? |
| Liferea | Yes | Yes | Yes | Yes | Yes | Yes | Yes | ? | Yes | Yes | Yes | ? |
| Mail (OS X) | ? | ? | ? | Yes | ? | ? | Yes | ? | No | Yes | Yes | ? |
| Maxthon | ? | ? | ? | ? | ? | ? | Yes | ? | Yes | Yes | ? | ? |
| MediaMonkey | ? | ? | ? | ? | Yes | ? | ? | ? | ? | ? | ? | ? |
| Microsoft Office Outlook | ? | Yes | Yes | Yes | ? | ? | Yes | ? | Yes | Yes | Yes | ? |
| Miro | ? | ? | ? | ? | Yes | Yes | ? | ? | ? | ? | ? | ? |
| Mozilla Firefox | ? | Add-on | Add-on | Add-on | ? | Add-on | Add-on | ? | No | Add-on | Add-on | ? |
| Mozilla Thunderbird | ? | Yes | Yes | Yes | ? | ? | Yes | Newsgroup | No | Yes | Yes | Yes |
| NetNewsWire | Yes | ? | ? | ? | ? | ? | ? | ? | No | ? | ? | No |
| Netscape Browser | ? | ? | ? | ? | ? | ? | Yes | ? | No | Yes | Yes | ? |
| Netscape Navigator 9 | ? | ? | ? | ? | ? | ? | Yes | ? | No | Yes | Yes | ? |
| NewsBlur | Yes | Yes | Yes | Yes | Yes | Yes | Yes | RSS 0.90, RSS 0.92, RSS 0.93, RSS 0.94, Atom 0.3, Atom 1.0 | Yes | Yes | Yes | ? |
| Newsboat | ? | Yes | Yes | Yes | ? | ? | Yes | ? | ? | Yes | ? | ? |
| NewsFire | ? | ? | ? | ? | ? | ? | ? | ? | ? | ? | ? | ? |
| OmniWeb | ? | ? | ? | ? | ? | ? | Yes | ? | ? | Yes | ? | ? |
| Pegasus Mail | ? | Yes | Yes | Yes | ? | ? | ? | ? | ? | ? | ? | ? |
| Protopage | Yes | Yes | Yes | Yes | Yes | Yes | Yes | RSS 0.90, RSS 0.92, RSS 0.93, RSS 0.94, Atom 0.3, Atom 1.0 | ? | Yes | Yes | ? |
| Pulse | ? | ? | ? | ? | ? | ? | ? | ? | ? | ? | ? | ? |
| Quiterss | ? | ? | Yes | Yes | ? | ? | Yes | ? | ? | ? | Yes | ? |
| Rhythmbox | ? | ? | ? | ? | Yes | ? | ? | ? | No | ? | Yes | ? |
| RSS Bandit | ? | ? | ? | ? | ? | ? | ? | ? | No | ? | ? | ? |
| RSS Guard | Yes | Yes | Yes | Yes | Yes | Yes | Yes | Gmail, JSON feeds, Inoreader, Nextcloud News, Feedly, Tiny Tiny RSS, FreshRSS, other services via Google Reader API | Google Reader API, Feedly, Gmail | Yes | Yes | Yes |
| RSSOwl | Yes | Yes | Yes | Yes | Yes | Yes | Yes | Newsgroup | No | Yes | Yes | ? |
| Safari | Yes | ? | Yes | Yes | ? | ? | Yes | ? | No | Yes | Yes | ? |
| Sage | ? | Yes | Yes | Yes | No | No | Yes | ? | ? | Yes | Yes | ? |
| SeaMonkey Mail & Newsgroups | ? | Yes | Yes | Yes | ? | ? | Yes | Newsgroup | ? | Yes | Yes | ? |
| Songbird | ? | Yes | Yes | Yes | Yes | Yes | Yes | ? | No | Yes | Yes | ? |
| Shiira | ? | ? | ? | ? | ? | ? | Yes | ? | ? | Yes | ? | ? |
| Sleipnir | ? | ? | ? | ? | ? | ? | Yes | ? | No | Yes | ? | ? |
| The Bat! | ? | Yes | Yes | Yes | ? | ? | Yes | ? | ? | Yes | ? | ? |
| The Old Reader | Yes | ? | ? | Yes | Yes | ? | Yes | PubSubHubbub | No | Yes | Yes | ? |
| Tiny Tiny RSS | ? | ? | ? | Yes | ? | ? | Yes | ? | No | ? | Yes | ? |
| Winamp | ? | ? | ? | ? | Yes | ? | ? | ? | ? | Yes | Notification only | ? |
| Windows Live Mail | ? | Yes | Yes | Yes | ? | ? | Yes | ? | Yes | Yes | Yes | ? |
| Zimbra | ? | Yes | Yes | Yes | ? | ? | Yes | ? | ? | ? | ? | ? |
| Zune | ? | ? | ? | ? | Yes | ? | ? | ? | ? | ? | ? | ? |
| Client | feed URI scheme | RSS 0.91 | RSS 1.0 | RSS 2.0 | RSS enclosure | MRSS | Atom | other standard | Delta updates | IPv6 | Auto updates | HTTP Basic Auth |

== Interface and notes ==
Web browsers and Internet suites have for browser plugin a N/A, because they don't need it.

| Client | Pop-up | Tray notification | Browser plugin | Email | "newspaper"-like | Media aggregator | Notes | Downloadable attachments |
|---|---|---|---|---|---|---|---|---|
| Akregator | Yes | Yes | Yes (integration with konqueror) | Yes | ? | Yes | KDE | ? |
| Amarok | ? | ? | ? | ? | ? | Yes | KDE | ? |
| AOL Explorer | ? | ? | —N/a | ? | ? | ? | Discontinued; Feed support is available in Internet Explorer 7 | ? |
| Awasu | Yes | Yes | —N/a | Yes | Yes | Yes | Supports user-written plugins. | Yes |
| BlogBridge | ? | ? | ? | ? | ? | ? | | ? |
| Canto | ? | ? | ? | ? | ? | ? | Ncurses/console based reader | ? |
| Claws Mail | Yes | Yes | Yes | Yes | ? | ? | RSSyl plugin needed | ? |
| CommaFeed | ? | ? | Yes | ? | Yes | ? | Web browser | ? |
| Cooliris | ? | ? | Yes | ? | ? | ? | Web browser plugin | ? |
| Feed Viewer | No | No | —N/a | No | Yes | Yes | | No |
| Feedreader | Yes | No | No | ? | Yes | ? | | ? |
| Flock | ? | ? | —N/a | ? | ? | Yes | Discontinued | ? |
| Gnus | Add-on | ? | ? | Yes | ? | ? | Emacs-based mail and news client | ? |
| HCL Notes | ? | ? | ? | ? | ? | ? | Studio Blog Reader is one RSS reader application for IBM Lotus Notes; Notes version 8.x introduced a native RSS reader | ? |
| Internet Explorer | ? | ? | —N/a | ? | Yes | ? | Feed support is available in Internet Explorer 7 | ? |
| iTunes | ? | ? | ? | ? | ? | Yes | | ? |
| Juice | ? | ? | ? | ? | ? | Yes | Designed as Podcast aggregator | ? |
| K-Meleon | ? | ? | ? | ? | ? | ? | Web browser | ? |
| Kazehakase | ? | ? | —N/a | ? | ? | ? | Web browser | ? |
| Liferea | Yes | Yes | ? | ? | ? | ? | | ? |
| Mail (OS X) | ? | ? | ? | Yes | ? | ? | | ? |
| Maxthon | ? | ? | —N/a | ? | ? | ? | Web browser | ? |
| MediaMonkey | ? | ? | ? | ? | ? | Yes | Media Player | ? |
| Microsoft Office Outlook | ? | ? | ? | ? | ? | ? | Feed support is available in Microsoft Office Outlook 2007 | ? |
| Miro | ? | ? | ? | ? | ? | Yes | Media Player | ? |
| Mozilla Firefox | Add-on | Add-on | —N/a | ? | ? | ? | Web Browser | ? |
| Mozilla Thunderbird | ? | Add-on | ? | Yes | No | ? | Mail Client | ? |
| NetNewsWire | ? | ? | ? | ? | ? | ? | | ? |
| Netscape Browser | ? | ? | —N/a | ? | ? | ? | Discontinued; Web browser | ? |
| Netscape Navigator 9 | Yes | ? | —N/a | ? | ? | ? | Discontinued | ? |
| NewsBlur | ? | ? | ? | ? | ? | ? | | ? |
| Newsboat | No | No | Yes | ? | ? | ? | Default browser can be configured in settings | ? |
| NewsFire | ? | ? | ? | ? | ? | ? | | ? |
| OmniWeb | ? | ? | ? | ? | ? | ? | Part of the OmniWeb browser | ? |
| Pegasus Mail | ? | ? | ? | Yes | ? | ? | Pegasus Mail can convert RSS feeds to e-mails via free add-ons | ? |
| Rhythmbox | ? | ? | ? | ? | ? | ? | Media Player | ? |
| RSS Bandit | ? | ? | ? | ? | ? | ? | .NET Framework based | ? |
| RSS Guard | Yes | Yes | No | Yes | Yes | Yes | Qt-based, supports online feed/message synchronization via Tiny Tiny RSS, Nextcloud News, Inoreader and others. Supports plugins written in C++/Qt, custom message filters via JavaScript, tags/labels. | Yes |
| RSSOwl | Yes | Yes | No | No | Yes | Yes | no longer support for Google Reader synchronization since version 2.2.0 | Yes |
| Safari | ? | ? | —N/a | ? | Yes | ? | Web Browser | ? |
| Sage | ? | ? | ? | ? | Yes | ? | a Firefox extension | ? |
| SeaMonkey Mail & Newsgroups | ? | ? | —N/a | Yes | ? | ? | Part of the SeaMonkey Internet suite | ? |
| Songbird | ? | ? | ? | ? | ? | Yes | Media Player | ? |
| Shiira | ? | ? | —N/a | ? | ? | ? | Web browser | ? |
| Sleipnir | ? | ? | —N/a | ? | ? | ? | Feed support is available in Internet Explorer 7 | ? |
| The Bat! | ? | ? | ? | Yes | No | No | Mail client; rss2mail or rss2pop3 plugin needed for versions prior to 6.4; newer versions support RSS natively | ? |
| The Old Reader | ? | ? | Yes | ? | ? | ? | | ? |
| Winamp | No | ? | No | No | No | Yes | Media Player | ? |
| Windows Live Mail | ? | ? | ? | Yes | ? | ? | | ? |
| Zimbra | ? | ? | ? | ? | ? | ? | Groupware suite | ? |
| Zune | ? | ? | ? | ? | ? | Yes | Media player | ? |
| Client | Pop-up | Tray notification | Browser plugin | Email | "newspaper"-like | Media aggregator | Notes | Downloadable attachments |

== Capabilities ==
| Client | Offline support | Search | Annotations | News Filtering | Pluginable | Automatic Update | Publish Capabilities |
|---|---|---|---|---|---|---|---|
| Akregator | Yes | Yes | No | Yes | ? | Yes | No |
| Amarok | ? | ? | ? | ? | ? | ? | ? |
| AOL Explorer | ? | ? | ? | ? | ? | ? | ? |
| Awasu | Yes | Yes | Yes | Yes | Yes | Yes | Yes |
| BlogBridge | ? | ? | ? | ? | ? | ? | ? |
| Canto | ? | ? | ? | ? | ? | ? | ? |
| Claws Mail | ? | ? | ? | ? | ? | ? | ? |
| CommaFeed | ? | Yes | ? | ? | ? | Yes | ? |
| Cooliris | ? | ? | ? | ? | ? | ? | ? |
| Feed Viewer | Yes | Yes | ? | No | No | Yes | Sharing |
| Feedreader | Yes | Yes | ? | ? | ? | Yes | ? |
| Flock | ? | ? | ? | ? | ? | ? | ? |
| Gnus | Yes | Yes | ? | ? | ? | Yes | ? |
| HCL Notes | ? | ? | ? | ? | ? | ? | ? |
| Internet Explorer | ? | ? | ? | ? | ? | ? | ? |
| iTunes | ? | ? | ? | ? | ? | ? | ? |
| Juice | ? | ? | ? | ? | ? | ? | ? |
| K-Meleon | ? | ? | ? | ? | ? | ? | ? |
| Kazehakase | ? | ? | ? | ? | ? | ? | ? |
| Liferea | Yes | Yes | ? | Yes | ? | Yes | ? |
| Mail (OS X) | ? | ? | ? | ? | ? | ? | ? |
| Maxthon | ? | ? | ? | ? | ? | ? | ? |
| MediaMonkey | ? | ? | ? | ? | ? | ? | ? |
| Microsoft Office Outlook | ? | ? | ? | ? | ? | ? | ? |
| Mozilla Firefox | ? | ? | ? | ? | ? | ? | ? |
| Mozilla Thunderbird | Yes | Yes | ? | Yes | ? | Yes | ? |
| NetNewsWire | Yes | Yes | ? | No | ? | ? | ? |
| Netscape Browser | ? | ? | ? | ? | ? | ? | ? |
| Netscape Navigator 9 | ? | ? | ? | ? | ? | ? | ? |
| Newsbeuter | Yes | Yes | Yes | Yes | Yes | Yes | No |
| NewsBlur | Yes | Yes | Yes | Yes | ? | ? | Yes |
| Newsboat | No | Yes | No | Yes | ? | Yes | No |
| NewsFire | ? | ? | ? | ? | ? | ? | ? |
| OmniWeb | ? | ? | ? | ? | ? | ? | ? |
| Pegasus Mail | ? | ? | ? | ? | ? | ? | ? |
| QuiteRSS | ? | ? | ? | Yes | ? | ? | ? |
| Rhythmbox | ? | ? | ? | ? | ? | ? | ? |
| RSS Bandit | ? | ? | ? | ? | ? | ? | ? |
| RSS Guard | Yes | Yes | Yes | Yes | Yes | Yes | Supports "share-to-published" feature for Tiny Tiny RSS., Sending e-mails via Gmail. |
| RSSOwl | No | Yes | ? | Yes | Yes | Yes | ? |
| Safari | ? | ? | ? | ? | ? | ? | ? |
| Sage | ? | ? | ? | ? | ? | ? | ? |
| SeaMonkey Mail & Newsgroups | ? | ? | ? | ? | ? | ? | ? |
| Shiira | ? | ? | ? | ? | ? | ? | ? |
| Sleipnir | ? | ? | ? | ? | ? | ? | ? |
| Songbird | ? | ? | ? | ? | ? | ? | ? |
| The Bat! | Yes | Yes | Yes | Yes | Yes | Yes | Yes |
| The Old Reader | Via some mobile apps | Yes | ? | ? | ? | Yes | Sharing |
| Tiny Tiny RSS | Yes | Yes | Yes | Yes | Yes | Yes | Yes |
| Winamp | ? | ? | ? | ? | ? | ? | ? |
| Windows Live Mail | ? | ? | ? | ? | ? | ? | ? |
| Zimbra | ? | ? | ? | ? | ? | ? | ? |
| Zune | ? | ? | ? | ? | ? | ? | ? |
| Client | Offline support | Search | Annotations | News Filtering | Pluginable | Automatic Update | Publish Capabilities |

== See also ==
- Comparison of email clients
- Comparison of web browsers
