= RSS Guard =

Free and open-source news aggregator

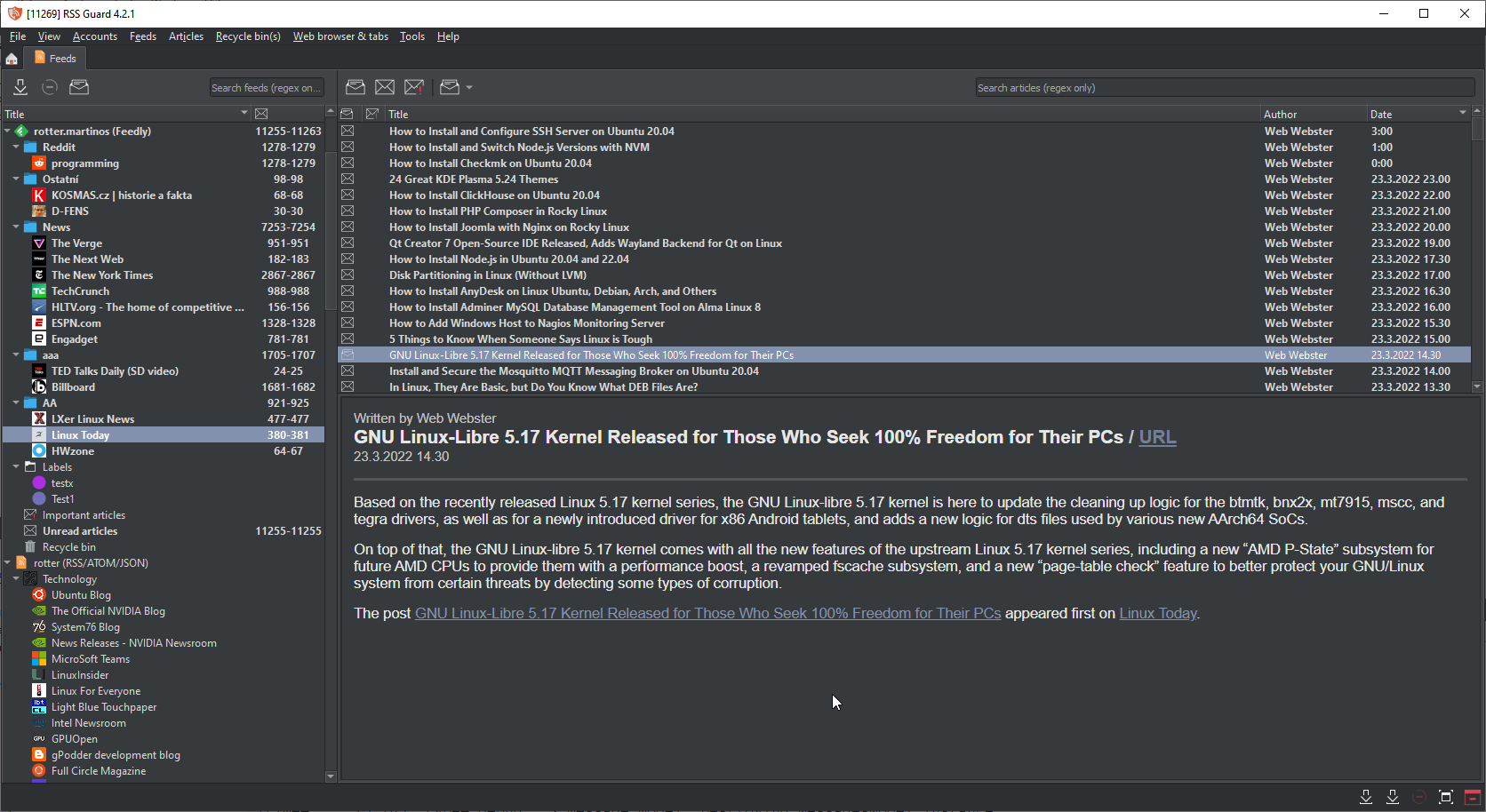
- RSS Guard, version 4.2.1 (dark mode)
- Developer: Martin Rotter
- Stable release: 4.8.6 / 7 September 2025
- Repository: github.com/martinrotter/rssguard
- Written in: C++ and Qt (software)
- Operating system: Microsoft Windows, macOS, Linux, OS/2, BSD
- Type: News aggregator
- License: GPL-3.0-only
- Website: github.com/martinrotter/rssguard

RSS Guard is a free and open-source news aggregator for web feeds and podcasts. It is written in C++ and uses Qt, which allows it to fit with the look and feel of different operating systems while remaining cross-platform. It includes a file downloader, advanced network proxy configuration, and supports external media viewing tools.

RSS Guard is released under the GPL-3.0-only license and is available for Windows, macOS, OS/2 and various Linux distributions.

== Features ==
=== Supported formats ===
The feed formats supported by RSS Guard are RSS/RDF, Atom, and JSON Feed. RSS Guard also supports Sitemaps.

RSS Guard can synchronize data with online feed services Tiny Tiny RSS, Nextcloud News, Feedly, Inoreader, feed readers which use Google Reader's API such as FreshRSS, The Old Reader, and Bazqux. The application may also act as a simple e-mail client for Gmail.

=== Feed discovery ===
RSS Guard is able to automatically detect all types of supported content given URL input.

=== Other features ===
RSS Guard can mark articles as read, unread, and important. Both article and feed lists can be filtered using regular expressions.

Time intervals for fetching feeds are configurable, and, through feed settings, they can be adjusted for each feed separately.

=== Scriptable article filtering and website scraping ===
RSS Guard is bundled with JavaScript engine which is used to write article filters - small scripts which define how the application should react when new article is downloaded.

RSS Guard also provides unified way of executing custom programs, which gives another way to modify raw feed data or even generate it, scraping the data from websites that do not offer a regular feed.

=== User interface ===
The application's toolbar and status bar are highly customizable. They can also be hidden, making RSS Guard look very minimalistic.

When in a horizontal layout, the articles viewer of RSS Guard is placed to the right side of the articles list.

RSS Guard supports skins. Light and dark skins are available by default.

User interface of RSS Guard is deliberately programmed in a way to be minimalistic and traditional.

=== Database ===
Feed data can be stored using SQLite or MariaDB. RSS Guard also supports the ability to import and export the database file and settings configuration to/from OPML 2.0.

=== Recycle bin ===
RSS Guard has its own recycle bin to prevent the accidental loss of saved articles. After emptying the recycle bin, removed articles will not appear in the list even after fetching. The actual deletion of articles, along with their cache, from the database should be done with the built-in database cleaning tool.

== Versions ==
RSS Guard offers two different versions:

- Standard version with embedded web viewer and a web browser for accessing content
- Lightweight version with simple text-based viewer

== Localizations ==
RSS Guard has been translated into many languages: Chinese (Simplified), Chinese (Traditional), Czech, Danish, Dutch, English, Finnish, French, Galician, German, Indonesian, Italian, Japanese, Lithuanian, Polish, Portuguese, Russian, Spanish, Swedish and Ukrainian.

== See also ==
- Comparison of feed aggregators
