= Newsboat =

Free and open source text-based RSS/Atom feedreader

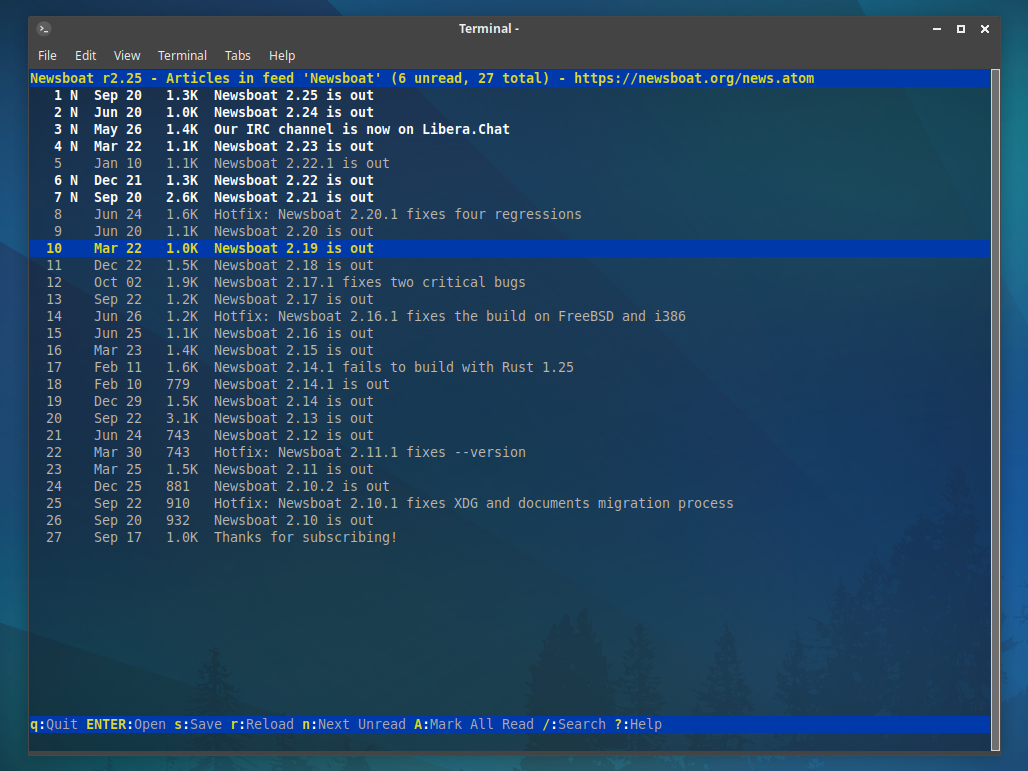
- Newsboat version 2.25 displaying news articles
- Original authors: Alexander Batischev and contributors
- Developers: Alexander Batischev and contributors
- Release: September 20, 2017; 9 years ago
- Stable release: 2.45 / 4 October 2026; 6 days ago
- Written in: C++, Rust
- Operating system: Linux, macOS, FreeBSD
- Available in: Catalan, Chinese, Chinese (Taiwan), Dutch, French, German, Hungarian, Italian, Japanese, Norwegian (Bokmål), Polish, Portuguese (Brazilian), Russian, Slovak, Spanish, Swedish, Turkish, and Ukrainian
- Type: News aggregator
- License: MIT License
- Website: newsboat.org
- Repository: github.com/newsboat/newsboat

Newsboat is a free and open-source RSS/Atom feed reader for text terminals for Unix-like operating systems, released under the MIT License. It is an actively maintained fork of Newsbeuter which was abandoned in September 2017. Newsbeuter's original developers advise users to switch to Newsboat, and Newsboat's version numbers continued where Newsbeuter left off. Newsboat supports feed formats RSS and Atom and can import and export subscription lists in the OPML format. It also supports podcasting and synchronization with other news reading services.

== Installation ==
Newsboat has been tested on Linux (with glibc and musl-libc), FreeBSD and macOS. The program can be installed from binary packages on major Linux and BSD distributions and Homebrew, it is available as a distribution-independent snap package, or it can be compiled from source.

== Operation ==
Newsboat is controlled entirely with the keyboard, and its default keybindings resemble those of vi. The keyboard shortcuts and a lot of other options can be configured with a single text file.

The feeds are placed in another plain textfile. Because Newsboat, like most feedreaders, supports the OPML format it can also import files from other feedreaders. In addition to merely importing feedlist from other readers, Newsboat can act as a client for news reading services like Tiny Tiny RSS, The Old Reader, Inoreader, NewsBlur, the newsreader apps for ownCloud and Nextcloud, and some more.

== Podcast support ==
Newsboat also provides basic podcast support through Podboat, a separate but included application that facilitates downloading and queuing of podcast episodes. It does not actually play the podcasts; for this an external media player is needed. While viewing a podcast feed in Newsboat, a user can press a single key to download the episode to their download queue. All the information will be stored in a queue file in the newsboat directory. Podboat reads this queue and downloads the episode(s) to the user's local drive.

== Reception ==
According to a review on Opensource.com "Newsboat is an excellent RSS reader, whether you need a basic set of features or want your application to do a whole lot more." Luke Baker of website Linuxlinks summarized his preview as "Newsboat is a wonderful, open source RSS reader. It’s lean, compact, super fast, endowed with a good feature set, and a worthy continuation of the Newsbeuter project. The software is extremely configurable and offers a great feature set without any bloat." Linux Magazine in its FOSSPicks praises Newsboats speed: "Everything happens so quickly. With your feeds listed in the main view, pressing R will reload the state of every feed in your list, and this happens quickly even with dozens of feeds." and mentions the benefits of a simple distraction-free text interface.

== See also ==
- Comparison of feed aggregators
