= Newsbeuter =

News aggregator for text terminals

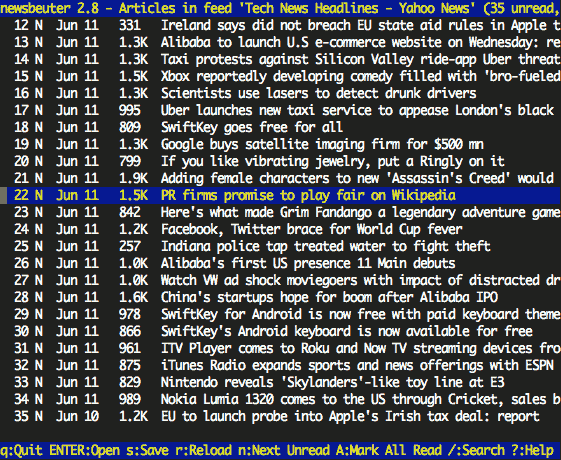
- Newsbeuter displaying news articles
- Original author: Andreas Krennmair
- Release: January 16, 2007; 19 years ago
- Stable release: 2.9 / 19 February 2015
- Written in: C++
- Operating system: Linux, macOS, FreeBSD
- Size: 421 KB (tar.gz source)
- Available in: 15 languages
- Type: News aggregator
- License: MIT License
- Website: www.newsbeuter.org
- Repository: github.com/akrennmair/newsbeuter

Newsbeuter was a text-based news aggregator for Unix-like systems. It was originally written by Andreas Krennmair in 2007 and released under the MIT License. The program is aimed at power users and strives to be "the mutt of rss feed readers." It supports the major feed formats including RSS and Atom and can import and export subscription lists in the OPML format. Newsbeuter (podbeuter) also supports podcasting and synchronization. As of 2017, the project is no longer maintained; the original developers advise users to switch to Newsboat, an actively maintained fork of Newsbeuter.

== Name ==
"Newsbeuter" is a pun on the German word Wildbeuter, which means "hunter-gatherer". According to Clifford Wolf, who is credited for coming up with the name, "during the stone age, people hunted and gathered their food, and these days, they hunt and gather news and information."

== Operation ==
Newsbeuter is entirely controlled by the keyboard, and its default keybindings resemble those of vi. The program supported synchronization with Google Reader since version 2.2, but this feature was removed when Google discontinued Google Reader. Support for alternatives such as The Old Reader and NewsBlur was introduced in version 2.8.

=== Configuration ===
Newsbeuter's appearance and keyboard shortcuts are configured with a single text file.

== Reception ==
Newsbeuter was the most popular news reader among Arch Linux users in 2012, and received 1.8% of votes in the "Best RSS Reader" category in a 2013 survey by Linux Journal. The program is often featured in magazine articles and software lists to demonstrate the power and versatility of the command line interface.

As an alternative to compiling the source files, Newsbeuter can be installed from pre-built binary packages on Debian, Ubuntu, Arch Linux, Gentoo, Slackware, FreeBSD, OpenSUSE, Fedora, Mandriva, PLD Linux, and OS X through the Homebrew package manager.

== See also ==
- List of feed aggregators
- Comparison of feed aggregators
