= Danny Thorpe =

American programmer noted

Danny Thorpe (died 22 Oct 2021) was an American programmer noted mainly for his work on Delphi.

== Career ==
He was the Chief Scientist for Windows and .NET developer tools at Borland Corporation starting from January 2004 until October 2005, as well as Chief Architect of the Delphi programming language from 2000 to 2005. He joined Borland in 1990 as an associate QA engineer working on Turbo Pascal 6.0. He was a member of the team that created the Delphi programming language, Visual Component Library (VCL), and IDE, released in 1995. In 1999, he was a founding member of the Kylix team, implementing the Delphi compiler and development environment on Linux, released in 2001. After the release of Kylix, he was the founder and lead programmer for Borland's Delphi .NET effort, porting and extending the Delphi language to the Microsoft .NET platform.

In 1994 while at Borland, he contracted with Santa Cruz startup Cinematronics (David Stafford and Mike Sandige) to build a component model and collision physics engine for a software pinball game. Cinematronics licensed an early version of the pinball engine to Microsoft for the Windows 95 Plus! Pack's "Space Cadet" pinball game. Cinematronics was later acquired by Maxis, who published Full Tilt! Pinball in 1996 and a sequel in 1998.

He joined Google in October 2005 and was a founding member of the Google Gears team, responsible for designing the client side browser local storage subsystem and JavaScript interface bindings.

He joined Microsoft's Windows Live Platform team in April 2006 as a Principal Software Development Engineer. His primary focus at Microsoft was the development of a secure client-side cross-domain scripting library for browser web apps, as well as the Windows Live Contacts Control built upon that library.

In October 2007, he joined startup Cooliris to work on the PicLens browser plugin for 3D visualization of web content.

In June 2008, he returned to Microsoft to work in a newly formed Cloud Computing Tools incubation team creating Visual Studio extensions to support development of applications for Microsoft's Windows Azure hosted services environment and Live Mesh / Live Framework client-side and offline web application environment.

In October 2010 he joined BiTKOO as Chief Software Architect to develop XACML based cloud scale distributed authorization and access control technologies. When BiTKOO was acquired by Quest Software in December 2011, he assumed the role of Product Architect in the Identity and Authorization Management (IAM) group at Quest Software. When Quest Software was acquired by Dell in September 2012, he continued to work on XACML authorization technologies under the title of Authorization Architect.

== Personal life ==
He lived on a small farm in the Santa Cruz mountains in Ben Lomond, California, which burned to the ground during the August 2020 CZU Lightning Complex fires. He and his wife, Cindy Fairhurst-Thorpe, had just purchased land in Oregon to retire to, and after the fires, moved there. Danny contracted brain cancer in 2017, and died on 22 Oct 2021 after a protracted battle. He is survived by his wife.

== Published work ==
- Delphi Component Design, Addison-Wesley Longman, ISBN 0-201-46136-6, 1997
