= Liferea =

News aggregator software

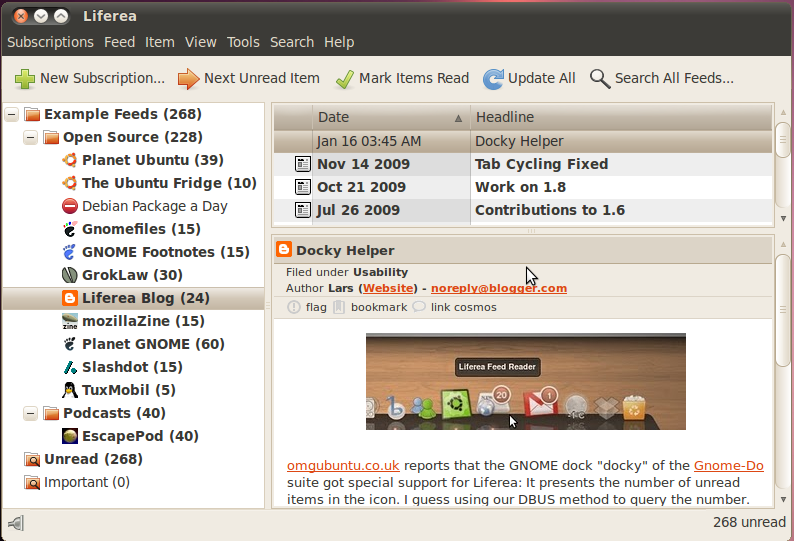
- Liferea browsing Linux related news
- Original author: Lars Windolf
- Stable release: 1.14.6 / 2 August 2023
- Written in: C, Python
- Operating system: Linux, BSD, Solaris
- Type: News aggregator
- License: GNU GPL
- Website: lzone.de/liferea
- Repository: github.com/lwindolf/liferea

Liferea (short for Linux Feed Reader) is a news aggregator for online news feeds and podcasts. It supports the major feed formats including RSS/RDF and Atom and can import and export subscription lists in OPML format. Liferea is intended to be a fast, easy to use, and easy to install news aggregator for GTK+ that can be used with the GNOME desktop. Liferea features a script manager, in which users can add custom scripts that run whenever a certain action occurs.

== Pronunciation ==
The lead programmer of Liferea, Lars Windolf, who is German, pronounces the name of the software [lifəreja].

== Distinguishing features ==
To easily read linked articles or weblog comments, Liferea allows reading websites using an embedded WebKit-based browser. Additionally, the user can configure an external browser (e.g. Firefox, Web, Konqueror) with which to open links.

It supports a number of different feed formats including RSS/RDF, CDF, Atom, OCS, and OPML, many of which its contemporaries cannot.

By sorting subscriptions into folders, the user can read all headlines of a folder at once. By enabling a filtering preference, all previously read headlines of the folder can be hidden.

Similar to the mail client Evolution, Liferea supports search folders, which allow the user to save searches. Each search folder contains all headlines that match its user-defined search rules.

Liferea can synchronize with online services such as Tiny Tiny RSS and The Old Reader to allow reading news feeds from multiple devices.

== Browser integration ==
In GNOME Web, there is a news feed subscription extension which allows adding news feeds when viewing websites.

For Firefox 1.5+ there is an extension (FeedBag) that allows adding subscriptions by simple clicking the LiveBookmarks icons in the Firefox address bar.

Since Firefox 2.0+, Liferea can be used without a special extension. To subscribe to new feeds from within Firefox, the Liferea helper script "liferea-add-feed" has to be configured in the Firefox feed subscription preferences.

== See also ==
- Comparison of feed aggregators
