= Feed URI scheme =

Proposed uniform resource identifier for web feeds

The feed URI scheme was a suggested uniform resource identifier (URI) scheme designed to facilitate subscription to web feeds; specifically, it was intended that a news aggregator be launched whenever a hyperlink to a feed URI was clicked in a web browser. The scheme was intended to flag a document in a syndication format such as Atom or RSS. The document would be typically served over HTTP.

== History ==
In 2006 the feed URI scheme was supported by several popular desktop aggregators, including NetNewsWire, FeedDemon, Safari, and Flock. As of 2011 no effort seems to be underway to officially register the scheme at IANA.

Critics hold that the purpose of the feed URI scheme is better served by MIME types, or that it is not a user-friendly solution for the problem of feed subscription, since a user who has not installed the appropriate software will receive an unhelpful browser error message on clicking a link to a feed URI.

The feed URI scheme was suggested in 2003 in draft-obasanjo-feed-URI-scheme-01 and 02. These expired drafts were not submitted as Internet drafts; the author later contributed to the work on the Atom standard.

== Syntax ==
The syntax for a feed URI may be expressed in Backus–Naur form as follows:

 <feed_uri> ::= "feed:" <absolute_uri> | "feed://" <authority> <path-abempty>

Specifically, a feed URI may be formed from any absolute URI (such as an absolute URL) by prepending feed, and as a special case, may be formed from any absolute http URI by replacing the initial http:// with feed://.

The <authority> and <path-abempty> constructs in the syntax are specified in RFC 3986 also known as STD 66. Here <authority> is in essence the userinfo@host:port part of the original http URI, and <path-abempty> is the following absolute path introduced by a slash "/"; it can be empty or absent. Therefore, the following are two examples of valid feed URIs:

feed:https://example.com/entries.atom
feed://example.com/entries.atom
