= RSSOwl =

Discontinued news aggregator

- RSSOwl Logo
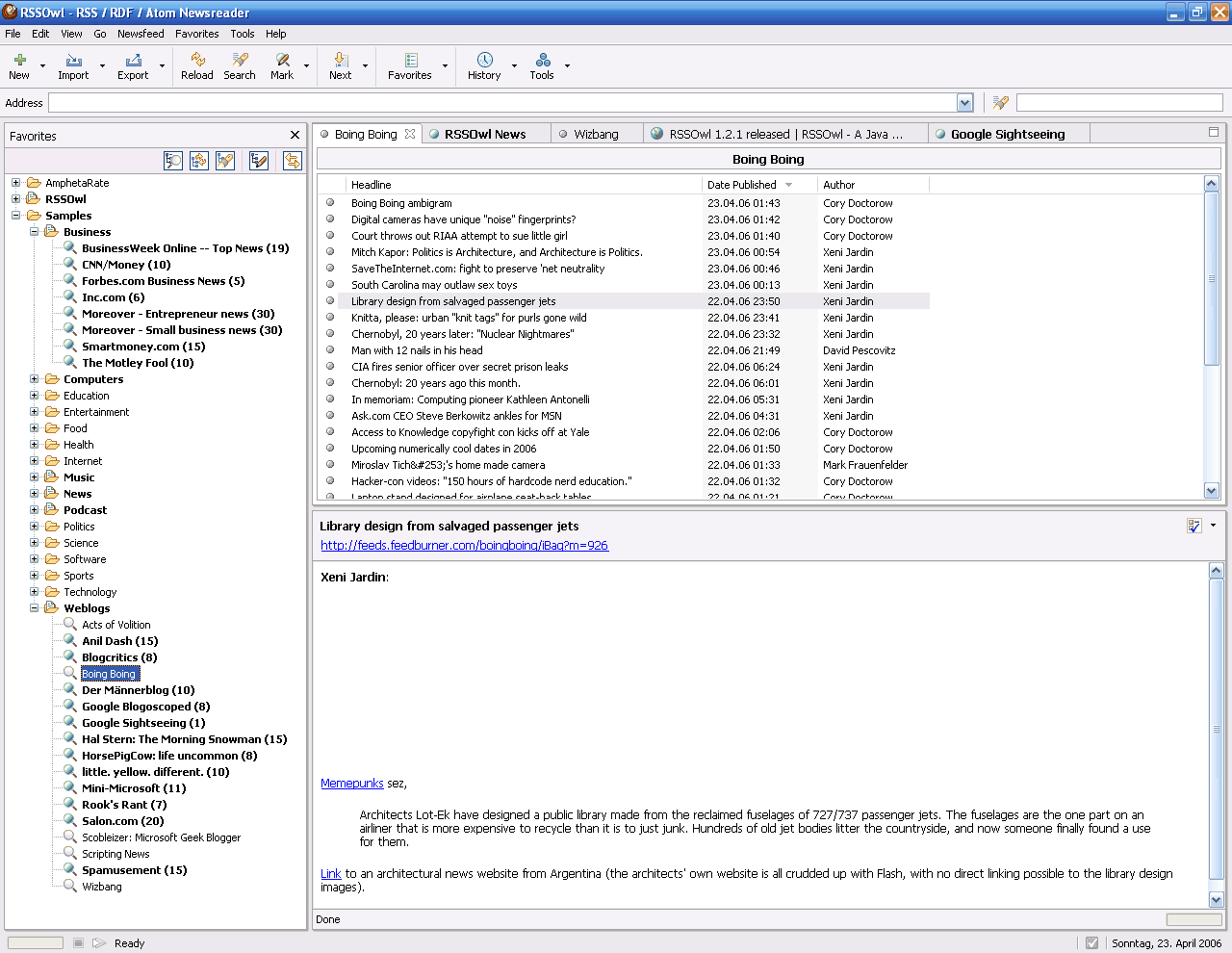
- Screenshot of RSSOwl
- Developer: Benjamin Pasero
- Initial release: December 19, 2004; 21 years ago
- Final release: 2.2.1 / 30 December 2013
- Repository: github.com/rssowl/RSSOwl
- Written in: Java
- Operating system: Cross-platform
- Platform: Eclipse
- Type: News aggregator
- License: EPL-1.0
- Website: rssowl.org

RSSOwl is a discontinued news aggregator for RSS and Atom news feeds. It is written in Java and built on the Eclipse Rich Client Platform which uses SWT as a widget toolkit to allow it to fit in with the look and feel of different operating systems while remaining cross-platform. Released under the EPL-1.0 license, RSSOwl is free software.

In addition to its full text searches, saved searches, notifications and filters, RSSOwl v2.1 synchronized with the now discontinued Google Reader.

== History ==
RSSOwl began as small project on SourceForge at the end of July 2003. The first public version was 0.3a.

=== Version 1.0 ===
RSSOwl 1.0 was released on December 19, 2001. It was released with support for RSS and Atom news feeds. The initial release also supported exporting feeds to PDF, RTF, and HTML. This release was available for Windows, Mac, Linux, and Solaris. RSSOwl 1.1 added support for toolbars and quick search in news feeds. Version 1.2 improved toolbar customization and added support for Atom 1.0 News feeds. Versions 1.2.1 and 1.2.2 added universal binary support for the Mac as well as drag and drop for tabs and a built-in feed validator. RSSOwl was the SourceForge Project of the Month for January 2005.

=== Version 2.0 ===
RSSOwl 2.0 was announced on March 7, 2007, at EclipseCon 2007. Version 2.0 was rebuilt on the Eclipse Rich Client Platform and used db4o for database storage and Lucene for text searching. Several milestone versions were released before the final 2.0 version that added labeling of news feeds, pop-up notification of new feeds and storage of news articles in news bins. The final 2.0 version was released as milestone 9 and added support for secure password and credential storage, news filters, support for embedding Firefox 3.0 XULRunner to render news feeds, and proxy support for Windows. Version 2.1, released July 15, 2011, added Google Reader synchronization support and new layouts.

=== Forks ===
RSSOwl is no longer maintained by its original developer. However, a maintained fork of it is available, known as RSSOwlnix.

== Features ==
=== Format support ===
- Full support for RSS & RDF versions 0.91, 0.92, 1.0, 2.0
- Support for Atom Syndication Format version 1.0
- Generate PDF, RTF, and HTML documents from any aggregate feed

=== Organization ===
- Powerful Newsfeed keyword-based search engine
- Perform a full-text search with results, highlighting favorites and categories
- Aggregate news of an entire category to one news tab
- Save favorite newsfeeds in categories
- Store newsfeeds in Blogrolls and share them with other people
- Mail News Tips to friends

=== Security ===
- Authentication via Base64, Digest and NTLM
- Display HTTPS secure newsfeeds

=== Import and Export ===
- Import and Export favorite newsfeeds using OPML (Outline Processor Markup Language)
- Import and Export your settings in RSS Owl to use them on another computer

=== Other ===
- Support for podcast downloading using news filters
- Integrated Newsfeed validator
- Erroneous favorites are marked
- Read news either in the internal browser or a Rich Text window
- Blog news viewed in RSS Owl with your favorite blogging tool
- Huge list of sample Newsfeeds pre-saved
- Select an auto-update-interval for your favorites
- View properties of a selected favorite

== Internationalization ==
RSSOwl has been translated into many languages, including Bengali, Bulgarian, Czech, Chinese (Simplified), Chinese (Traditional), Danish, Dutch, English, Finnish, French, Galician, German, Greek, Hungarian, Italian, Japanese, Korean, Norwegian, Polish, Portuguese, Russian, Serbian (Cyrillic), Serbian (Latin), Slovenian, Spanish, Swedish, Thai, Turkish, and Ukrainian.

== See also ==
- Comparison of feed aggregators
