= RSS Bandit =

Open source RSS aggregator

- Developer(s): Dare Obasanjo and Torsten Rendelmann
- Initial release: 2003; 22 years ago
- Stable release: 1.9.0.1002 / 4 July 2010
- Operating system: Windows
- Type: News aggregator
- License: BSD-3-Clause
- Website: rssbandit.org

RSS Bandit is an open source RSS/Atom aggregator based on the Microsoft .NET framework. It was originally released as a code sample in a series of articles the Extreme XML column written by Dare Obasanjo on MSDN in 2003. The code samples were developed into an open source project. It is currently hosted on GitHub and the primary contributors are Dare Obasanjo and Torsten Rendelmann.

== Features ==
=== Interface ===
The three-pane user interface is modeled after desktop email clients, with a tree view showing the list of feeds. The application has a number of features inspired by email readers and other RSS readers including:

- Search folders for reading all items that match a search term or just all unread items
- Import and export subscription lists as an OPML file
- Keyboard shortcuts for main functions
- Ability to download podcasts
- Automatic marking of items as read as they are scrolled past
- Search in all feeds, across all updates from subscriptions
- Current subscription lists and read/unread state of items in the application can be synchronized via a FTP or WebDAV server, allowing use from multiple computers
- Feeds can be read from a Google Reader account, allowing the user to subscribe or unsubscribe from feeds, mark items as read or star them in RSS Bandit and have these changes reflected in Google Reader
- Feeds can be read from Facebook accounts, to read their news feed and comment on the status updates of their friends.

== Reception ==
The application received 4 out 5 stars in a review on Download.com. It has also received 4 out of 5 stars in a review on About.com.

== See also ==
- Comparison of feed aggregators
