= Feedreader (application) =

RSS and Atom news aggregator software

- Feedreader Feed Window
- Developer: i-Systems Inc.
- Operating system: Microsoft Windows
- Type: Feed reader
- License: Proprietary
- Website: www.feedreader.com

Feedreader is a free RSS and Atom aggregator for Windows. It has a stripped down, though configurable, three-pane interface similar to NetNewsWire on Mac OS X. Recent beta versions use MySQL as database back-end.

Feedreader was one of the first desktop feed readers; version 1.54 of Feedreader of the application were distributed on April 24, 2001. The company behind Feedreader says that it was the first personal desktop RSS reader.

Feedreader has an auto-discovery feature, whose purpose is to find RSS feeds on any web page and subscribe to them in an automated fashion. Moreover, the program can use keyboard shortcuts, search through one's RSS feeds, and can be run from a USB flash drive. The installation file is 4.44 MB, which is notably small for a feed reader with such features.

== See also ==
- Comparison of feed aggregators

== Notes ==
- Fileforums.betanews.com
- i-Systems Inc. "About us", Feedreader Homepage, March 25, 2008. Accessed March 25, 2008
