= NewsFire =

RSS newsreader for Mac

- NewsFire ScreenShot
- Developer: David Watanabe
- Stable release: 2.0
- Operating system: Mac OS X
- Type: RSS Reader
- License: Proprietary
- Website: www.newsfirex.com

NewsFire is an RSS newsreader developed by David Watanabe for Mac OS X. It supports Atom, RSS, and Podcasting. NewsFire features groups, labels, smart groups, search, and integration with iTunes, Spotlight, and weblog editors. NewsFire can also import and export a blogroll from and to OPML; however, it cannot import Google Reader OPML at this time due to a known bug.

On March 1, 2008, NewsFire became freeware, but since the release of NewsFire 2.0 to the Mac AppStore on February 3, 2011, NewsFire is not freeware anymore.

NewsFire 1.3 requires Mac OS X v10.4. NewsFire 1.1 was the final version supporting Mac OS X v10.3.

In July 2025, NewsFire cannot be found in the Mac AppStore, and the download link from the website is broken.

== See also ==
- Comparison of feed aggregators
