= Feedbin =

Open source feed reader

- Written in: Ruby, Ruby on Rails
- Type: Feed Reader
- License: MIT License
- Website: feedbin.com

Feedbin is an open source feed reader created by Ben Ubois and launched in March 2013, one day prior to the announcement that Google Reader was shutting down. It is a web application which can be self hosted on a web server or used through a paid subscription. It has an Android client based on News+ as well as a native iOS application.

Since its launch, Feedbin and its related software have been regularly updated with new features, enhancements, and integrations, including, but not limited to:

- Privacy protections that hide user activity from third parties
- Visual upgrades, such as new themes and automatic dark mode
- Subscribing to newsletters with custom email addresses
- Browser extensions that provide "read later" functionality
- YouTube embeds
- Airshow for playing podcasts subscribed to in Feedbin
- Triggering Actions in response to feeds
