= BlogBridge =

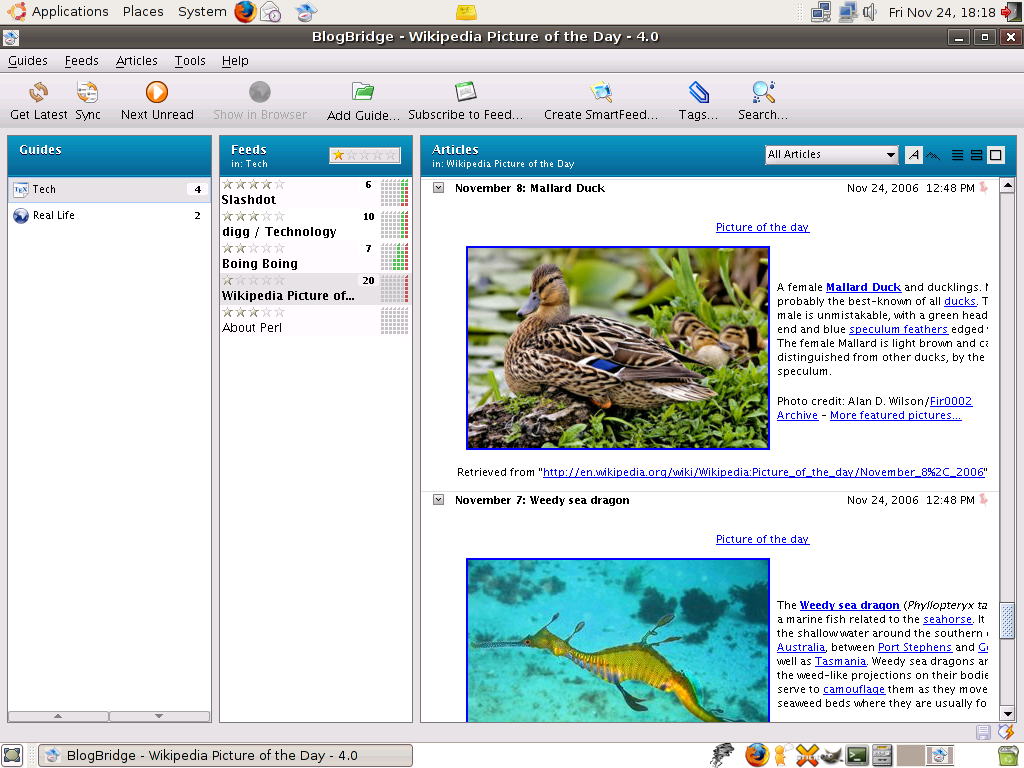
- BlogBridge viewing a feed
- Final release: 6.6.1 / 26 February 2009
- Preview release: 6.3 / 10 April 2008
- Operating system: Windows, Mac OS X, Linux
- Type: feed aggregator
- License: GPL-2.0-or-later
- Website: www.blogbridge.com
- Repository: github.com/pitosalas/blogbridge

BlogBridge is an open-source Java-based feed aggregator. It is aimed at users who subscribe to many feeds, including journalists, PR professionals and OPML enthusiasts.

Its development team is led by Pito Salas. The software contains a feature called a SmartFeed, which returns articles from other feeds containing user-defined keywords.

== BlogBridge service ==
BlogBridge also gives users the option to create an account with a free BlogBridge service, which lets users upload a list of their feeds to their account so that they can synchronize their feeds across multiple computers. The service can also be used to back up feeds in the event of data loss. From version 6.0, BlogBridge features a built-in memo tracker and detailed statistics, along with performance improvements and fixes.

BlogBridge seems to be no longer maintained or further developed since 2013.

== See also ==
- Comparison of feed aggregators (with a list)
