= Address bar =

Web browser widget that shows the current URL

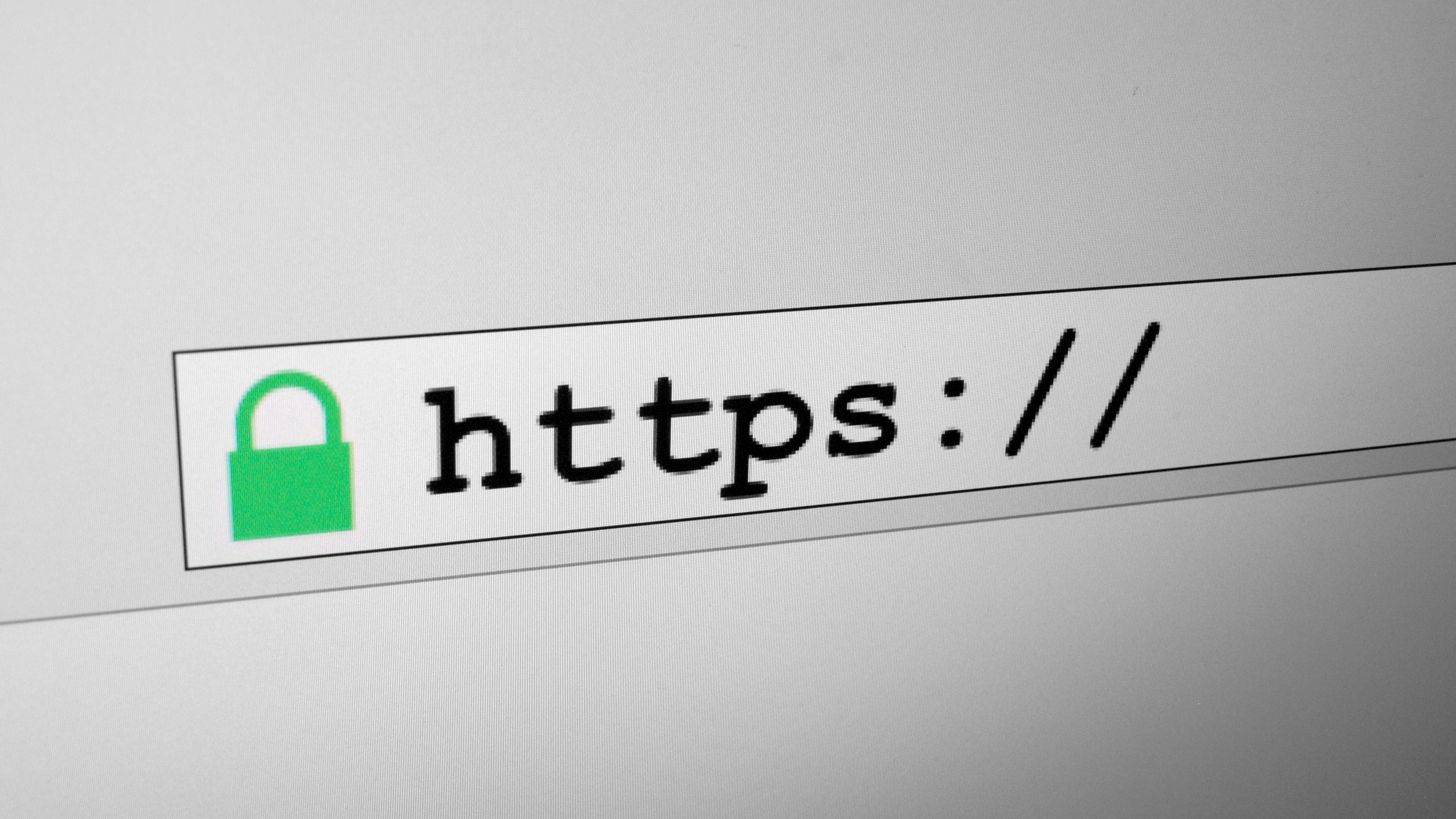
An address bar.

In a web browser, the address bar (also location bar or URL bar) is the element that shows the current URL. The user can type a URL into it to navigate to a chosen website. In most modern browsers, non-URLs are automatically sent to a search engine. In a file browser, it serves the same purpose of navigation, but through the file-system hierarchy.

Many address bars offer features like autocomplete, and a list of suggestions that appear while the address is being typed in. This auto-fill feature bases its suggestions on the browser's history. Some browsers have keyboard shortcuts to auto-complete an address.

== Features ==
In addition to the URL, some address bars feature icons showing features or information about the site. For websites using a favicon (a small icon that represents the website), the favicon may be present within the address bar, a generic icon appearing if the website does not specify one. The address bar is also used to show the security status of a web page; various designs are used to distinguish between insecure HTTP and encrypted HTTPS, alongside the use of an Extended Validation Certificate, which some websites use to verify their identity.

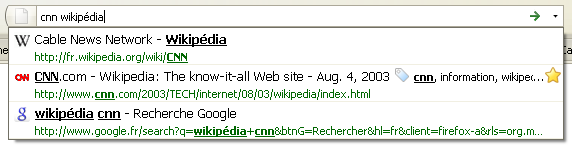
An example of the Firefox browser treating non-URL text as a search term

Most web browsers allow for the use of a search engine if the term typed in is not clearly a URL. This will usually also auto-complete, if the search engine offers this feature, to popular answers, some engines even suggesting answers to basic maths queries. Some browsers, such as Firefox, Opera and Google Chrome, allow for website-specific searches to be set by the user. For example, by associating the shortcut "!w" with Wikipedia, "!w cake" can be entered into the address bar to navigate directly to the Wikipedia article for cake. This feature is standardised for users of the search engine DuckDuckGo as "bangs".

Web browsers often include a feature called Smart Bookmarks. In this feature, the user sets a command that allows for a function (such as searching, editing, or posting) of a website to be expedited. Then, a keyword or term associated with the command is typed into the address bar followed by entering the term afterwards or selecting the command from a list.

In some browsers, such as Opera and Safari, the address bar can double as a progress bar that indicates how much of the contents of the page has been loaded.

== Comparisons ==
The following sections compare address bar widgets for a few well-known web browsers. The screenshots below are meant to be representative, and may not exactly match the browsers' current user interfaces.

=== Google Chrome ===
Google Chrome's address bar when visiting the main page of the English Wikipedia as seen from Chrome OS

Google Chrome's address bar when visiting the secure Wikimedia main page as seen from

Chrome's address bar when visiting a site that has an Extended Validation Certificate as seen from Windows 7

=== Firefox ===
Firefox version 62's address bar when visiting example.com

Firefox's address bar when visiting the English Wikipedia

Firefox's address bar when visiting the Wikimedia Foundation's credit card payment page, which uses an Extended Validation Certificate

=== Opera ===
Opera version 9's address bar when visiting the English Wikipedia

Opera's address bar when visiting the English Wikipedia secure

=== Microsoft Edge ===
The address bar of Microsoft Edge when visiting the English Wikipedia through HTTPS

== See also ==
- Combo box
