= Media RSS =

Extension for RSS web feeds

Media RSS (MRSS) is an RSS extension that adds several enhancements to RSS enclosures, and is used for syndicating multimedia files (audio, video, image) in RSS feeds. It was originally designed by Yahoo! and the Media RSS community in 2004, but in 2009 its development has been moved to the RSS Advisory Board. One example of enhancements is specification of thumbnails for each media enclosure, and the possibility to enclose multiple versions of the same content (e.g. different file formats).

The format can be used for podcasting, which uses the RSS format as a means of delivering content to media-playing devices, as well as Smart TVs. Media RSS allows for a much more detailed description of the content to be delivered to the subscriber than the RSS standard. The standard is also used by content publishers to feed media files into Yahoo! Video Search, which is a feature of Yahoo! Search that allows users to search for video files.

== Support ==
=== Applications supporting MRSS ===
- Adobe Media Player
- Amazon Fire TV
- Cooliris
- Dailymotion
- Dokuwiki
- QuiteRSS
- Roku
- VideoNest

=== Services supporting MRSS ===
- Cooliris
- The Filter
- Phanfare
- DeviantArt
- JW Player
- PeerTube
- Brightcove
