= News360 =

Defunct news aggregation app

- Developer: News360 Inc.
- Release: 2010
- Operating system: iOS, Android, Windows 8, Windows Phone
- Platform: iPad, iPhone, iPod Touch; Android devices, Windows 8, Windows Phone
- Type: News Aggregator, Personalization
- Website: news360.com

News360 was a personalized news aggregation app for smartphones, tablets and the web. It attempted to learn a user's interests by analyzing their interaction with news stories on the app and using semantic analysis and natural language processing to create an Interest Graph and construct a unique feed of relevant content for each user. The app claimed an audience of more than 4 million users.

Initially released for iPhone in late 2010, News360 was eventually available for all major mobile platforms, with versions for the iPad, iPhone, Android, Windows 8, Windows Phone, BlackBerry and the web.

In August 2019, News360 was acquired by PressReader.

As of August 2022, News360 ceased operations.

== History ==
News360 was founded in July, 2010. In October 2010, the first News360 Windows Phone 7 app was released. In November 2010, the first News360 iPhone app was released, followed by an iPad version in March 2011. In May, 2011 the company released News360 for Android tablets, and in July - for Android phones. News360 2.0 was released in November, 2011, adding an ability to create custom feeds. The next version, News360 3.0, was launched in July, 2012, introducing the News360 personalization engine and the "Home" feed, which merges all of the user's interests, custom feeds and sources into a single feed that uses behavioral analysis to get better at selecting the most relevant content the more the user uses the app. The release was generally well-received, with a New York Times reviewer saying "For a great news experience, the free app News360 has to be one of the better news-aggregating [apps] I’ve seen on any platform". In September, 2012 News360 announced the Publisher Partnership Program together with 30 brands, including the Chicago Tribune, CNBC, Fox Sports, Business Insider, Gigaom and others.

In March 2019, News360 announced the launch of Audio Briefings and an ad-free version as features available in a paid subscription plan called News360 Premium.

== Technology ==
News360 uses a semantic analysis engine, developed in-house by the company, to analyze content aggregated from over 100,000 sources around the web. After performing named-entity recognition, classification, and cluster analysis, News360 uses a complex formula to rank stories, taking in the influence of the source, author, text quality and complexity, size and velocity of the story cluster and many other metrics. The system then takes the clustered and ranked set of stories and identifies a personalized selection for each user, based on their interest graph. The Interest Graph is initially constructed by collecting, with permission, user data from Facebook, Twitter or Evernote. As the user uses News360, additional data is collected from their behavior - as they read stories and give feedback, the interest graph becomes more and more accurate and attuned to their real interests, making the personalization more effective.

In 2016, News360 launched NativeAI, an audience analytics tool for publishers and content marketers. NativeAI tracks over a million unique audience interests based on reader behavior on publishers' websites and provides publishers with a cloud-based analytics & content monetization service. The content monetization works through sponsored content while the analytics uses machine learning to give insights on audience engagement.

== See also ==
- Flipboard
- Pulse
