= Digital newspaper =

A digital newspaper is a digital version of a printed newspaper. Newspapers can be digitally published online or as a digital copy on a digital device, such as a mobile phone or an E Ink reader.

== Online ==
=== Web ===
Many organisations that publish a printed newspaper have also an online newspaper. Newspapers can decide to publish the same information as in the printed version online, or choose to provide different articles compared to the printed newspaper. Information can be provided for free or as a paid subscription. Some printed newspapers have decided to have their publication only published online. In the Netherlands the freesheet DAG killed the printed edition in 2008. In the US The Capital Times decided also to continue online in 2008. In Australia, the Australia Times became the first Australian newspaper to publish a digital newspaper edition in May 2010 which is accessed through its Australia Times Reader software.

Some newspapers provide digitalized versions of their printed editions. A commonly used format is pdf.

Others experiment with new layouts to provide the news on their websites. The New York Times tried to fit as many articles as possible on a screen by using a layout that resembles a full newspaper sheet.

=== Mobile phones ===
PressDisplay.com created an application to read newspapers on the iPhone. The New York Times has also a special application designed for the iPhone and iPod Touch.

=== Future ===
Some people have argued that any device could be suitable for distributing news as long as the distribution is kept easy and intuitive. Journalist David Carr discussed in the International Herald Tribune the possible success for an 'iTunes' for news. The Economist also discussed this option.

== Offline ==
=== E ink ===
It is possible to read several newspapers on e-readers via an application of the company Newspaper Direct, which runs on the DR1000 series of IREX. Newspaper Direct offers a kind of virtual newspaper kiosk where the user can choose the paper. The company offers titles from eighty countries. The Dutch newspapers involved are: AD, Telegraaf, de Volkskrant, NRC and Het Nederlands Dagblad. Company Press Display offers a similar service.

Examples of newspapers on e ink:

- Dutch Newspaper NRC Handelsblad on the Ilead
- Several newspapers on Amazon's Kindle
- French newspaper Les Echos on epaper
- Le Monde and Figaro
