= OmniWeb =

Web browser

- Wikipedia on OmniWeb 6.0 preview on macOS Monterey
- Developer: The Omni Group
- Release: March 17, 1995; 31 years ago
- Stable release: 5.11.2 / 20 July 2012
- Preview release: 6.0 test (v636.0.14) / 24 February 2026
- Operating system: Mac OS X 10.4.8 or later
- Available in: English, Finnish, French, German, Italian, Japanese, Simplified Chinese, Swedish
- Type: Web browser
- License: Proprietary (browser), LGPL (WebKit)
- Website: omnigroup.com/more

OmniWeb is a web browser developed and marketed by The Omni Group exclusively for Apple's macOS operating system. Though a stable version is no longer maintained, it is still available as a free download, and unstable versions are still being released.

== History ==
OmniWeb was originally developed by Omni Group for the NeXTSTEP platform and was released by Lighthouse Design on March 17, 1995, after only one month's development. As NeXTSTEP evolved into OPENSTEP and then Mac OS X, OmniWeb was updated to run on these platforms. These early versions of OmniWeb also run on Microsoft Windows through the Yellow Box or the OpenStep frameworks. After Sun Microsystems bought Lighthouse Design, the Omni Group released the product from version 2.5 onwards. From version 4.0 onwards, OmniWeb was developed solely for the OS X platform.

OmniWeb was developed using the Cocoa API, which allows it to take full advantage of OS X features. It uses Quartz to render images and smooth text. It uses multiple processors, if available, and features an interface that uses Aqua UI features such as drawers, sheets, and customizable toolbars.

The Omni Group originally employed its proprietary HTML layout engine that uses standard API NSText components. However, this engine was very slow, particularly when scrolling, and was not fully compatible with the most recent web standards, such as Cascading Style Sheets. In OmniWeb version 4.5, the Omni Group adopted Apple's KHTML-based WebCore rendering engine, which was created by Apple for its Safari browser.

On August 11, 2004, the Omni Group released version 5.0 of OmniWeb, which added several new features. The most notable addition was an unusual implementation of tabbed browsing, in which the tabs are displayed vertically in a drawer on the side of the window (including optional thumbnail pictures of the pages.) Despite controversy over the merits of a tab drawer over a tab toolbar, the feature persists through the final version.

On September 7, 2006, version 5.5 was released. Major new features include the use of a custom version of WebKit instead of WebCore, universal binary support, saving to the web archive, support for user-defined style sheets, a "Select Next Link" feature, FTP folder display, ad-blocking improvements, updated localizations, and many other small changes and bug fixes.

OmniWeb was Omni Group's flagship app, but as OS X web browsers improved—Apple eventually bundled Safari into OS X— and Omni successfully introduced other products such as OmniGraffle and OmniOutliner, OmniWeb's importance diminished. OmniWeb's price was successively lowered, first to $39.95, then on February 24, 2009, Omni Group announced that OmniWeb would be made available for free, a change from its previous price of $14.95.

== Features ==
- Separate window form editing: Click the square in the upper right corner of multi line form fields to open it in a separate window. This helped when adding much text to a small area and wanting to see all of it at once. This feature also allowed you to enter tab characters.
- Workspaces: groups of web browser windows and tabs in them. A user can have multiple workspaces for different web research topics and quickly switch between them with a key shortcut or menu choice
- View Links: By clicking on this button in the toolbar, one can quickly view all the links contained in the page.
- Ad blocking: OmniWeb uses a powerful pattern match ad blocking feature to stop images from loading from servers matching the pattern. It is also possible to block images that didn't originate from the current server and to block images that match common advertisement sizes.
- Shortcuts: allows one to type a key word or phrase to open a certain web site or begin a specific web search.
- Site-specific preferences: OmniWeb allows you to specify preferences that apply to specific websites. For example, if you adjust the font size on a given web page, the adjusted font size is used on all other pages of the same site. Preferences are saved automatically and retained between browsing sessions.

== Reception ==
OmniWeb was popular in the early 2000s when OmniGroup's experience developing for OpenStep (which became the foundation for Mac OS X) gave them an edge over other developers. Until Apple's Safari, the Omni Group had the best support for Mac OS X technologies among its competition (chiefly Mozilla Firefox and Internet Explorer for Mac). John Siracusa, a technology journalist and critic writing for Ars Technica, said, "Finding [this level of functionality] in a proper Mac OS X application from a respected developer with a proven track record is like finding a perfect 1/10,000th scale replica of the Eiffel Tower in a box of crackerjacks. Then the tower transforms into a tiny robot and makes you lunch."

== See also ==
- List of web browsers
- Comparison of web browsers
- List of feed aggregators
- Comparison of feed aggregators
