= Pito Salas =

Software developer

Pito Salas is a Curaçaoan-American Cambridge, Massachusetts-based software developer. While working with Lotus' Advanced Technology Group in 1986, Salas invented the pivot table, a "next-generation" spreadsheet concept that was released by Lotus in 1989, as Lotus Improv.

In their book Pivot Table Data Crunching, authors Bill Jelen and Mike Alexander call Pito Salas the "father of pivot tables" and credit the pivot table concept with allowing an analyst to replace fifteen minutes of complicated data table and database functions with "just seconds" of dragging fields into place.

In 1996, Salas co-founded eRoom Technology, Inc. with Jeffrey Beir and served as the company's CTO until it was acquired by Documentum in 2002. He is a principal architect of the BlogBridge Newsreader software.

Salas is Professor of the Practice of Computer Science at Brandeis University, where he earned his degree.
