= LinkedIn Pulse =

Former news aggregation app now part of LinkedIn

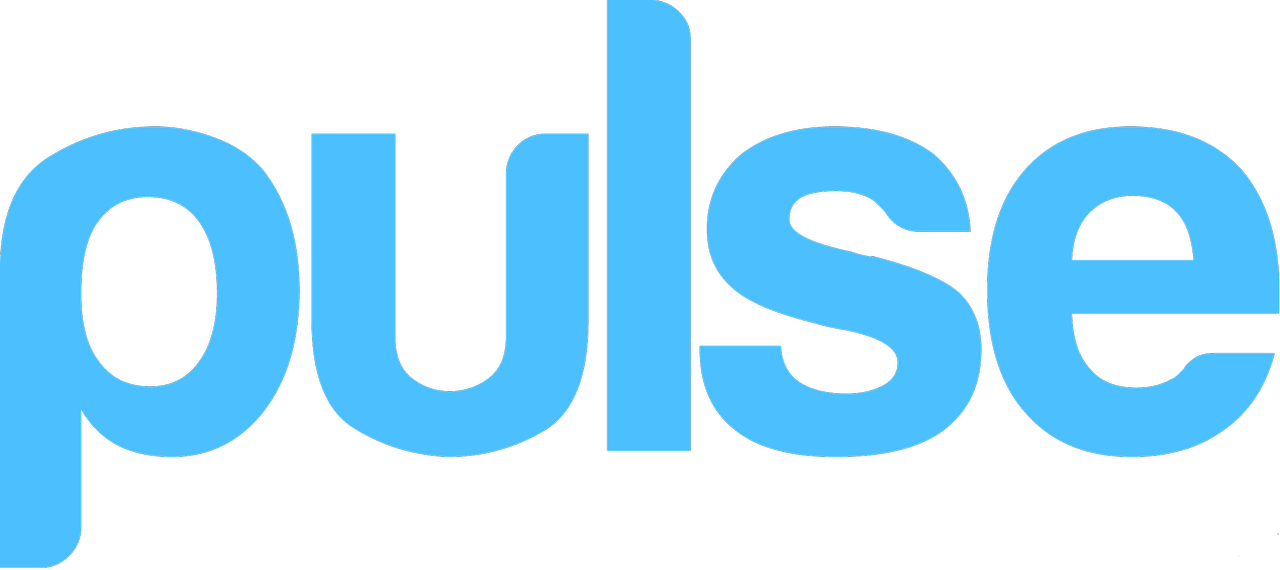
- Icon
- Developer: LinkedIn
- Release: May 2010; 16 years ago
- Platform: Web Browser, iOS, Android
- Type: News aggregator
- License: Free
- Website: linkedin.com/pulse

LinkedIn Pulse was a news aggregation app originally developed for Android, iOS and HTML5 browsers, originally released in 2010. The app, in its original incarnation, was deprecated in 2015 and integrated into LinkedIn.

== History ==
Pulse Mobile Application icon

Pulse was originally released in May 2010 for the Apple iPad. The app was created by Ankit Gupta and Akshay Kothari (two Stanford University graduate students) as part of a course at the Institute of Design. The company they formed, Alphonso Labs, was one of the first to use Stanford's business incubator SSE Labs. Pulse received positive reviews for its easy-to-use interface.

On 8 June 2010, the app was temporarily removed from the App Store hours after it was mentioned by Apple co-founder Steve Jobs at WWDC 2010, because The New York Times complained to Apple that the app pulled content from the nytimes.com and boston.com RSS feeds in violation of the terms of use prohibiting commercial redistribution. The app was approved once again and restored to the App Store later the same day after removing The New York Times feed.

On 2 July 2010 a version of the app was released for iPhone and iPod Touch named Pulse News Mini. It featured the same interface and features as the iPad version on a smaller scale. Later that month the app was also released for Android smartphones.

On 1 October 2010 Pulse version 2.0 was released, this update included the ability to add up to 60 news feeds and introduced pages that could be configured to show different types of news.

On 15 November 2010 Pulse was made a free app for iOS and Android.

In 2011 Pulse was selected as one of 50 apps in Apple's App Store Hall of Fame and named one of TIME's top 50 iPhone apps of the year. This raised the profile of the app helping it to gain even more popularity.

On 9 August 2012 a Pulse web app was announced. The app featured a radically different design using different sized tiles put together to form a 'mosaic' like interface. Written in HTML5 the app works with all modern web browsers, however a special partnership formed between Alphonso Labs and Microsoft brings unique features such as gestures to users of Internet Explorer 10.

On 8 November 2012 Pulse 3.0 was released for iOS and Android. It included a redesigned sidebar similar to the one found on the web app for switching between pages. Also included in the update was a new icon and the ability to add an unlimited number of news feeds.

Pulse was listed among Time Techland's 50 Best Android Applications for 2013.

On 11 April 2013 it was announced as previously rumoured that LinkedIn had purchased Pulse from Alphonso Labs for $90 million. In the beginning of November 2013, version 4.0 was launched, integrating the Pulse app and LinkedIn. Along with the integration was a massive UI overhaul that was met largely by negative reviews by longtime users. On 17 June 2015, Pulse decided to completely redesign the new experience from the ground up. The stated reason for this change was to deliver personalized news from a user's professional network (primarily from LinkedIn, the purchaser of Pulse), and allow little to none user customization. This change also triggered a wave of negative backlash from the app's userbase, including a dramatic drop in ratings in the App Store and Google Play.

On 25 November 2015, LinkedIn announced that the original Pulse app was to be retired on 31 December 2015, after which user feeds ceased to update.

== See also ==
- Comparison of feed aggregators
- Feedly
- Flipboard
