= Juice (aggregator) =

Podcast aggregator

- Developer: Juice Team
- Stable release: 2.2 / 11 November 2005
- Preview release: 2.2.2-a1 / 20 July 2006
- Written in: Python
- Operating system: OS X, Windows
- Type: Podcasting
- Licence: GPL-2.0-or-later
- Website: juicereceiver.sourceforge.net

Juice is a podcast aggregator for Windows and OS X used for downloading media files such as ogg and MP3 for playback on the computer or for copying to a digital audio player. Juice lets a user schedule downloading of specific podcasts, and will notify the user when a new show is available. It is free software available under the GNU General Public License. The project is hosted at SourceForge. Formerly known as iPodder and later as iPodder Lemon, the software's name was changed to Juice in November 2005 in the face of legal pressure from Apple, Inc.

== Development ==
The original development team was formed by Erik de Jonge, Robin Jans, Martijn Venrooy, Perica Zivkovic from the company Active8 based in the Netherlands, Andrew Grumet, Garth Kidd and Mark Posth joined the team soon after the first release. The development team credited the program concept to Adam Curry who founded ipodder.org, wrote a little Applescript as a proof of concept and provided the first podcast shows (then referred to as 'audio enclosures') but primarily to Dave Winer who was the inspiration for Adam Curry. The first version also included a screenscraper for normal HTML files. Initially, it was not clear that podcasting would be completely tied to RSS. Although that was eventually the method chosen, during the early development phase a diverse range of people were working on alternatives, including a version based on Freenet.

The program is written in Python and, through use of a cross-platform UI library, runs on Mac OS X and Microsoft Windows 2000 or Windows XP. A Linux variant has not been developed.

In 2006 the team effectively stopped further development of the program, the developers started working in other fields, some Podcasting related. Adam Curry and Andrew Grumet started working on a commercial show network (podshow) where all the shows are sponsored and the distinction between show and commercial is faded to the background. Others went on to other ventures.

== Legacy ==
The 2004 growth of podcasting inspired other podcatching programs, such as IPodderX, based on pyPodder, and jPodder, as well as Apple iTunes June 2005 addition of a podcast subscription feature in its music player. This development quickly put an end to the popularity of the Juice application.

== Forks ==
There have been several forks of Juice.

The team from Active8 created PodNova an application which integrates well with Juice with an opml interface, which was available on Windows, Mac OS X and Linux, but closed at the end of February 2010.

== See also ==
- Comparison of feed aggregators
