= PressReader =

Digital newspaper company based in Canada

- Type: Private
- Industry: Computer software
- Founded: 1999 (27 years ago) as NewspaperDirect; Richmond, British Columbia, Canada
- Founder: Alexander Kroogman
- Headquarters: Vancouver, British Columbia, Canada,
- Key people: Ruairí Doyle (CEO)
- Services: Digital newspaper & magazine publishing and distribution
- Number of employees: 500
- Website: pressreader.com

PressReader is a digital newspaper distribution and technology company with headquarters in Vancouver, Canada, and offices in Dublin, Ireland, and Manila, Philippines.

PressReader distributes digital versions of over 7,000 newspapers and magazines in more than 60 languages through its applications for iOS, Android, Windows, Mac and various e-readers as well as its website, and operates digital editions of newspapers and magazines for publishers, including The New York Times, Financial Times, The Economist, The Wall Street Journal, National Post and The Globe and Mail.

== History ==
Founded in 1999 as NewspaperDirect, the company started as a service for printing physical copies of newspapers, aimed at travelers who wished to read their home newspaper while staying in a hotel abroad, and launched a digital product in 2003.

In 2013, the company rebranded as PressReader.

In 2017, the company opened an office in Dublin, Ireland.

In 2019, the company acquired News360, makers of the News360 personalised news app and NativeAI, an audience intelligence product for news publishers.

In 2022, PressReader announced the CEO succession. Ruairí Doyle was appointed chief executive officer; Alexander Kroogman transitioned to executive director.

== Products ==
=== PressReader ===
PressReader's eponymous product is an all-you-can-read newspaper and magazine subscription service, which costs $29.99 per month and grants access to all of the titles in the company's library via PressReader apps and website. The company partners with various hotels, airlines, cafes and other businesses which sponsor access to the service for their customers.

As of May 2019, PressReader has 12 million monthly active users.

=== Branded editions ===
PressReader operates the digital editions of various newspapers and magazines on their websites and apps through a white-labeled platform called Branded Editions.

== Partnerships ==
In October 2023, The New York Times Company (NYT) and PressReader announced a new partnership to further expand NYT's global presence through PressReader's network of channel partners spanning over 150 countries. PressReader has become the exclusive distributor of NYT's digital news products and digital replica editions to hotels, airlines, cruise and ferry lines, and non-U.S. public libraries.

In August 2023, PressReader announced an expanded partnership with Gannett – the largest newspaper publisher in the U.S. and owner of USA Today.

In January 2023, PressReader became The Economist's exclusive digital distributor globally in public libraries, hotels, aviation, marine and healthcare as part of an expansion of the two parties' strategic partnership.

== Cyber attack ==
On 3 March 2022, PressReader's web platform was blocked by a cyberattack and access to 7,000 publications, worldwide, was halted. The attack came just a few days after PressReader removed dozens of Russian newspapers from its catalogue. The company began to restore its services on 6 March.

== See also ==
- Apple News
- Texture
- Scribd
