= Feed Viewer =

News aggregator application

- Developer(s): Vaclav Dajbych
- Initial release: April 2006
Stable release
- Windows: 150.2.10 / August 10, 2021; 3 years ago
- iOS: 0.1.39 / August 10, 2021; 3 years ago
- Written in: C#
- Operating system: Windows, iOS
- Type: News aggregator
- Website: www.feedviewer.app

Feed Viewer is a news aggregator application for PCs and mobile devices running Windows. It presents online sources for the user in unified layout. Feed Viewer was first released in 2006.

== History ==
The app Feed Viewer was initially launched in April, 2006, designed as a Windows Vista gadget. It was written in C# for .NET runtime allowing running on Windows XP. It won journalist award for desktop application and ranked among best RSS readers of Živě.cz journal. In February, 2012, the Windows Phone version was released. It was primarily designed for mobile devices without mobile internet access. In 2010 started development of the online indexing service allowing feed aggregation in the cloud. In January, 2013, the version for Windows 8 was released followed by a new Windows Phone version featuring clutter free user experience. Both of them were connected to the cloud-based RSS aggregation service. Versions for Windows 10, both desktop and mobile, were introduced shortly after the release of these operating systems.

== User interface ==
The application's user interface is designed for visual overview of the news, allowing browsing a large amount of content quickly. It strictly follows guidelines for Windows Runtime apps.

== See also ==
- Comparison of feed aggregators
