= Awasu =

Windows RSS aggregator

Awasu is an RSS aggregator for Windows. It features a multi-pane view with the list of channels on the left and details about the feed on the right, and can alert the user when a feed gets updated. It was positively reviewed by both CNET.com and PC Magazine, which both gave it 4/5.
