= QuiteRSS =

Free software RSS reader

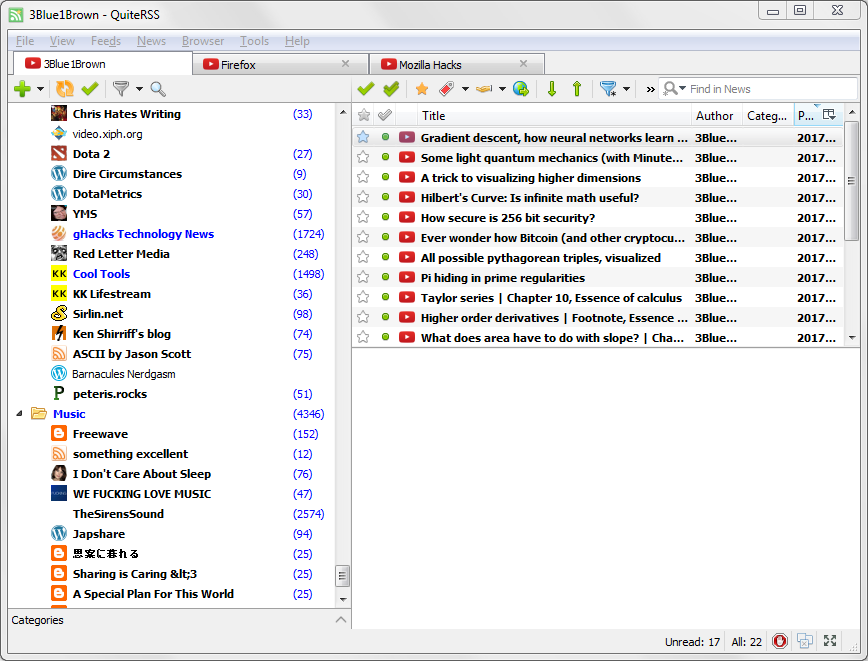
- Screenshot of Quite RSS
- Developers: Aleksey Khokhryakov, Shilyaev Egor
- Release: 2012; 14 years ago
- Stable release: 0.19.4 / March 8, 2020; 6 years ago
- Written in: C++
- Operating system: Linux, MacOS, Windows, FreeBSD, OS/2
- Platform: Qt
- Type: News aggregator
- License: GPL-3.0-or-later
- Website: quiterss.org
- Repository: github.com/QuiteRSS/quiterss

QuiteRSS was a free and open source cross-platform news aggregator for RSS and Atom news feeds. QuiteRSS is released under the GPL-3.0-or-later license. It is available for Microsoft Windows, MacOS, Linux, and OS/2. QuiteRSS is also available as a portable application for Windows.

== Features ==
QuiteRSS has two layout modes, classic and newspaper. The classic layout has a three-panel view for the feed list, posts and browser. The program supports tabbed browsing, import/export of OPML feeds, basic web browsing functions, adblocking, tags and system tray integration. It uses the WebKit browsing engine for its embedded browser

In 2020, support for Media-RSS was added which allows multimedia content to be sent in an RSS feed.

== Forks ==
The project was revived through NotQuiteRSS, a software fork. This version removes the HTML engine, ports the application to the Qt6 framework, introduced new features, and resolves existing bugs.

== See also ==
- News aggregator
