= CommaFeed =

Free and open source feed reader

- Commafeed Logo

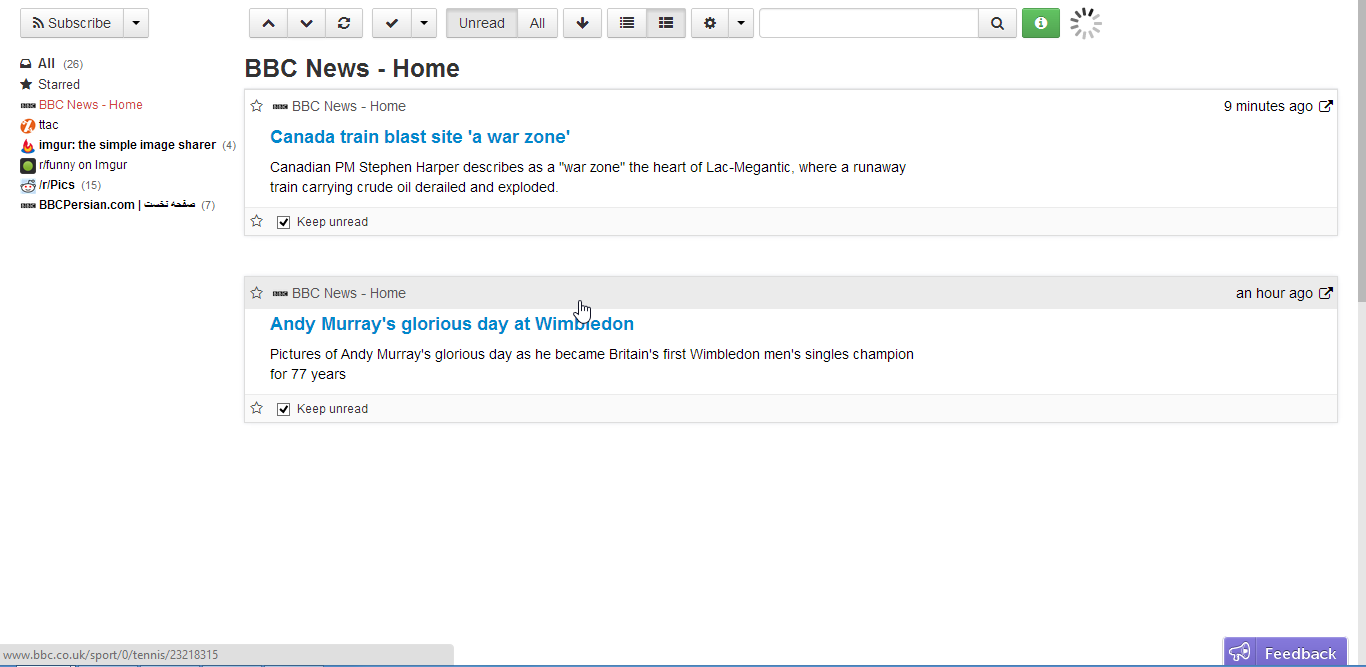
- Commafeed.com screenshot
- Original author: Jérémie Panzer
- Stable release: 4.3.1 / 12 February 2024
- Preview release: 2.5.0-beta1 / 12 October 2017
- Repository: github.com/Athou/commafeed
- Written in: Java
- Operating system: Multi-platform
- Available in: Multi-languages
- Type: Feed Reader
- License: Apache License, Version 2.0
- Website: www.commafeed.com

CommaFeed is a free and open source feed reader. It is a web application which can be self hosted on a web server or used through commafeed.com. It has responsive design supporting desktop, tablet and mobile browser simultaneously. An Android News+ client was available but discontinued. It supports right-to-left feeds.
