= Protopage =

RSS Reader, Virtual Desktop and Internet Start page launched in London on 15 May 2005

Protopage Ltd.
- Company type: Limited company
- Available in: Multilingual
- Founded: London, 2004
- Headquarters: London, United Kingdom
- Area served: Worldwide
- Founder: Andre Parrie
- Website: www.protopage.com
- Launched: May 15, 2005; 21 years ago
- Current status: Active

Protopage is an RSS reader, virtual desktop, and Internet start page launched in London, United Kingdom, on 15 May 2005.

The design offers color-coded tabs and categories to organize information, an audio and video podcast function, a news reader, the option to add cartoons, and a selection of widgets, which can be dragged onto the desktop, arranged, and re-sized. It is highly customizable and has been described as "simple to use." One criticism is that it has only one mail widget, which requires connection via IMAP.

Protopage has not taken venture capital and is debt-free. Protopage outlasted Google's competitor service iGoogle, which also launched in 2005 (just a few days after Protopage) but was shut down in November 2013, as well as Netvibes, launched in 2005 too but closed in June 2025.

In 2007, the site was named one of the top 10 best free web apps by PC Magazine. In 2008, it scored 4.5 out of 5 stars in a review by About.com. In 2013, Chris Pirillo called Protopage "the best designed AJAX portal".

In August 2015, support for "Universal headline import" was announced, which allows the service to import headlines from any web site regardless of whether that site supports RSS feeds or not.

== See also ==
- Start page
