= Kazehakase =

Web browser for Unix systems, 2003–2009

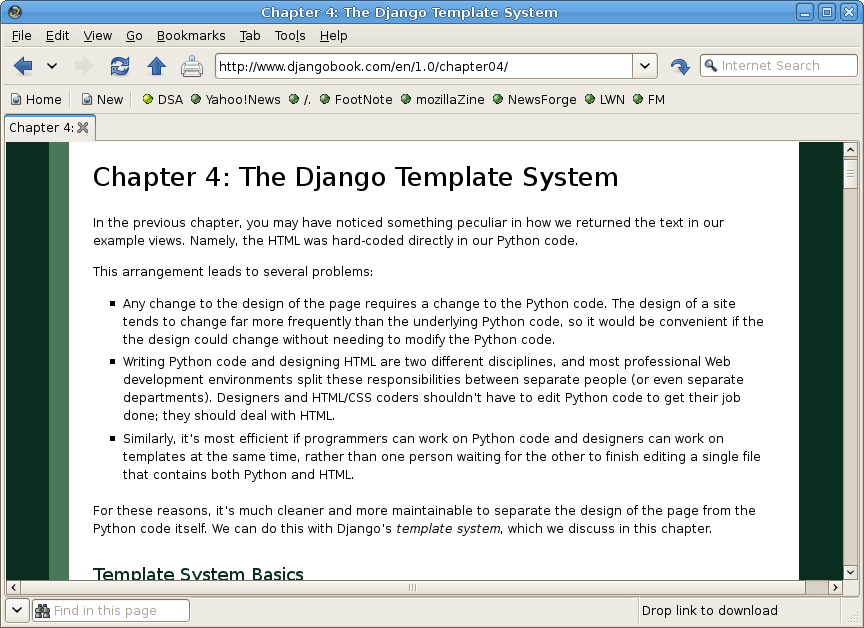
- Screenshot of Kazehakase
- Initial release: January 29, 2003
- Final release: 0.5.8 / 29 September 2009
- Operating system: Unix-like
- Type: Web browser Feed reader
- License: GPL-2.0-or-later
- Website: Archived March 4, 2016, at the Wayback Machine

Kazehakase (Japanese: Dr. Wind (風博士, kaze hakase)) is a discontinued web browser for Unix-like operating systems that uses the GTK+ libraries. Kazehakase embeds the Gecko layout engine as well as GTK+ WebKit.

The browser is named after the short story "Kazehakase" by the Japanese author Ango Sakaguchi; its literal meaning is "Dr. Wind" (a PhD rather than a medical doctor).

== Features ==
Notable features include:

- Support for RSS as well as its Japanese variants LIRS and HINA-DI
- Drag-and-drop of browser tabs
- Mouse gestures
- Import of bookmarks from Mozilla Firefox, Mozilla Application Suite, Netscape Browser, Galeon, Konqueror, and w3m; shared bookmarks (with XBEL)
- "Smart Bookmarks" programmable with regular expressions
- Full text search in browser history
