= The Old Reader =

News aggregator

- Logo used until February 2017
- Website type: news aggregator
- Available in: English, Spanish, French, German, Italian, Catalan, Portuguese, Norwegian, Swedish, Dutch, Greek, Slovene, Polish, Czech, Hungarian, Ukrainian, Russian, Turkish, Chinese
- Owner: Levee Labs
- Website: theoldreader.com
- Registration: Required
- Users: 450,000+
- Launched: 12 June 2012; 14 years ago
- Current status: Online
- Written in: Ruby on Rails

The Old Reader is a web-based news aggregator that delivers website, blog, and other Internet content to a web-based inbox. The service sprang up when Google removed social features from Google Reader; the site supports social media sharing, including the ability to "like" content and find friends via social media networks.

== History ==
The Old Reader was started as a hobby project by Elena Bulygina, Dmitry Krasnoukhov, and Anton Tolchanov. In March 2013, it had only 10,000 users, but it started gaining popularity quickly after Google announced that month that it would retire Google Reader. By the end of April 2013, the project already had 200,000 users and Anton had to quit, leaving just Elena and Dmitry.

By July 2013, The Old Reader team announced plans to close the public version of the service, following a significant increase in users after Google Reader's shutdown. At the time, the platform had 420,000 registered users, including 60,000 new sign-ups in a single day. The team announced their intention to close the public version of the reader, leaving only a private website for a limited number of people. However, a few days later, another announcement stated that the website will remain public, with support from an unnamed "corporate entity in the United States". In November 2013, the team mentioned that the new owner was Levee Labs.

In 2014, a new team upgraded The Old Reader's infrastructure, added features like a browser bookmarklet, and introduced a Premium service to support the platform financially, maintaining the original founders' ad-free approach.

In March 2024, Ben Wolf, one of the owners of Levee Labs, posted on LinkedIn that they had closed an acquisition and that The Old Reader would have a new team taking over, but no more details were given since.

== Features ==
The Old Reader is free for up to 100 feeds and offers a Premium version with full-text search and up to 500 subscriptions and 1 year of post storage. Former users of Google Reader or other RSS readers can import feeds via OPML export. A browser bookmarklet lets users send web pages directly to The Old Reader account.

The service is integrated with Facebook or Google to help users find friends also using the site. There is also support for Readability, Instapaper, and Spritz, a service to help read content faster.

== Mobile applications ==
The Old Reader has made its mobile API freely available to facilitate support for mobile applications. The service is supported by a number of mobile applications for all major platforms, including Reeder and Feeddler for iOS, Greader for Android (no longer available as of 2018), Old Reader for Windows Phone and ThOR for Symbian.

== Reception ==
The Old Reader's reception was generally positive. PC Magazine praised its simple design and social aspects, but noted it lacked some of the features of its competitors. Dave Winer, one of the creators of RSS and other technology pundits have praised The Old Reader team's commitment to open web standards and delivering ad-free services, although as of 17 March 2015 the service includes "sponsored posts" inline with aggregated content.

== See also ==
- Comparison of feed aggregators
- RSS Reader
- Feedly
- Digg Reader
- NewsBlur
