= Inoreader =

RSS feed reader

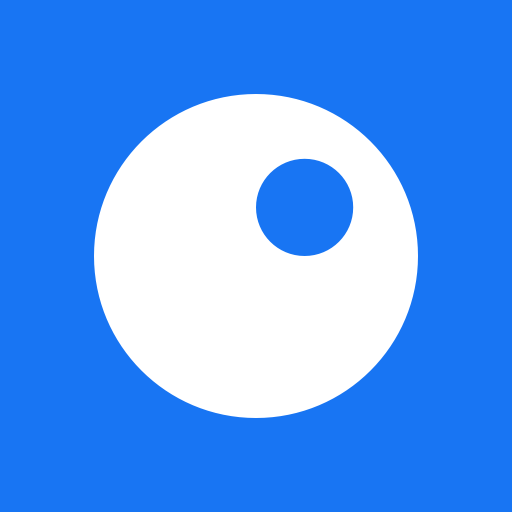
- Developer: Innologica
- Release: 2013
- Stable release: 7.6.6 / 28 October 2023; 2 years ago
- Written in: PHP
- Operating system: Android iOS
- Platform: Web Browser, mobile
- Type: News aggregator
- License: Freemium
- Website: inoreader.com

Inoreader is a web-based content and RSS feed reader, a cloud-based service for web browsers and mobile devices running iOS and Android. It compiles news feeds from online sources for the user in unified layout to customize and share with others. Inoreader was first released by Innologica in 2013.

== History ==
In 2012, Ivo Djokov and Yordan Yordanov co-founded Innologica Ltd. They started working on a project, called Inoreader, after reading 2012 speculation that Google Reader was to shut down. The founders sought to create a platform that used RSS feeds, content reading, and was power-user friendly, with social media integration to connect users to the information they find interesting. In 2013, Inoreader was officially launched in three versions: Basic, Plus, and Professional, which supported both RSS and Atom.

After the initial release of Inoreader, several developers joined the project and Innologica opened its API for other developers' use.

== Interface ==
The application interface evolved several times from an early version, optimized for a wide range of devices. The application requires registration and can be configured to fetch feeds within regular intervals. In late 2013, Inoreader had an upgrade to its user experience and design. Apart from the basic function of content and feed reader, Inoreader serves additional functions, some of the features are

- automating specific tasks with internal rules
- saving pages from the web for reading later
- searching in all indexed feeds, not just subscriptions
- creating searches that are updated with new articles matching specific keywords
- organizing feeds in folders and assigning tags
- manual import of feeds from other aggregators
- display extended article content
- PDF downloads
- sharing to social networks and internally in the platform
- full archive of past items in the user’s subscriptions

=== Organization ===
For further control over the reader’s interface and how things function, user can access the preferences menus and control various aspects of the app’s behavior from the Reading tab. One could then order that list by date or relevance. Users can also choose the layout of feeds and folders. Folders organize subscriptions and tags serve to organize different articles manually.

=== Android and iOS app ===
In July, 2013, Innologica released an Android app for Inoreader, and in July 2014 they launched the iOS app. The app is free to use for all users, while the functionality options depend on the account type. The application syncs the feed information for the whole account, so readers can continue with the unread articles they had on the web platform. As of Feb 2016, the app has a rating of 4.3 out of 5 on Google Play and 5 out of 5 on iTunes.

=== Web browser applications ===
In April, 2013, Innologica released Google Chrome, Safari, Firefox and Opera extensions for Inoreader. Inoreader integrates into the web browser, where all of the news feeds can be found and filtered in search. The user can use the extension to subscribe to feeds or save web pages. The extension has a rating of 4.79 out of 5 on the Chrome Web Store.

== Reception ==
Early reviews for the application have been mostly positive. It was considered one of the main Google Reader alternatives and its UI was found very similar to Google Reader. It has been appreciated mostly for the many different functions it provides to users, most of which are included in the free Basic plan, although with limited use. In 2015, Innologica monetized their application and introduced ads to their platform, which was initially criticized by its users. The company later announced that ads can be removed if the user opts for a plan upgrade.
