= Cooliris (plugin) =

Web browser extension

- Developer(s): Cooliris
- Initial release: January 2008; 17 years ago
- Operating system: Microsoft Windows, Mac OS X, Linux
- Type: Web Application framework
- Website: www.cooliris.com As of January 2024 this domain name is for sale.

Cooliris (for Desktop), formerly known as PicLens, was a web browser extension developed by Cooliris, Inc, and later acquired by Yahoo. The plugin provides an interactive 3D-like experience for viewing digital images and videos from the web and from desktop applications. The software places a small icon atop image thumbnails that appear on a webpage. Clicking on the icon loads the Cooliris 3D Wall, a browsing environment that gives the user the effect of flying through a three-dimensional space.

Released to the public in January 2008, The New York Times described Cooliris as the "new immersive approach to Web navigation". Cooliris went out to win the 2008 Crunchies Award for Best Design. The plugin has received over 50 million downloads.

As of May 2014 browser plugins are unavailable from the official website. There are only links to tablet apps - for iOS and Android.
