= Tiny Tiny RSS =

Free web-based feedreader

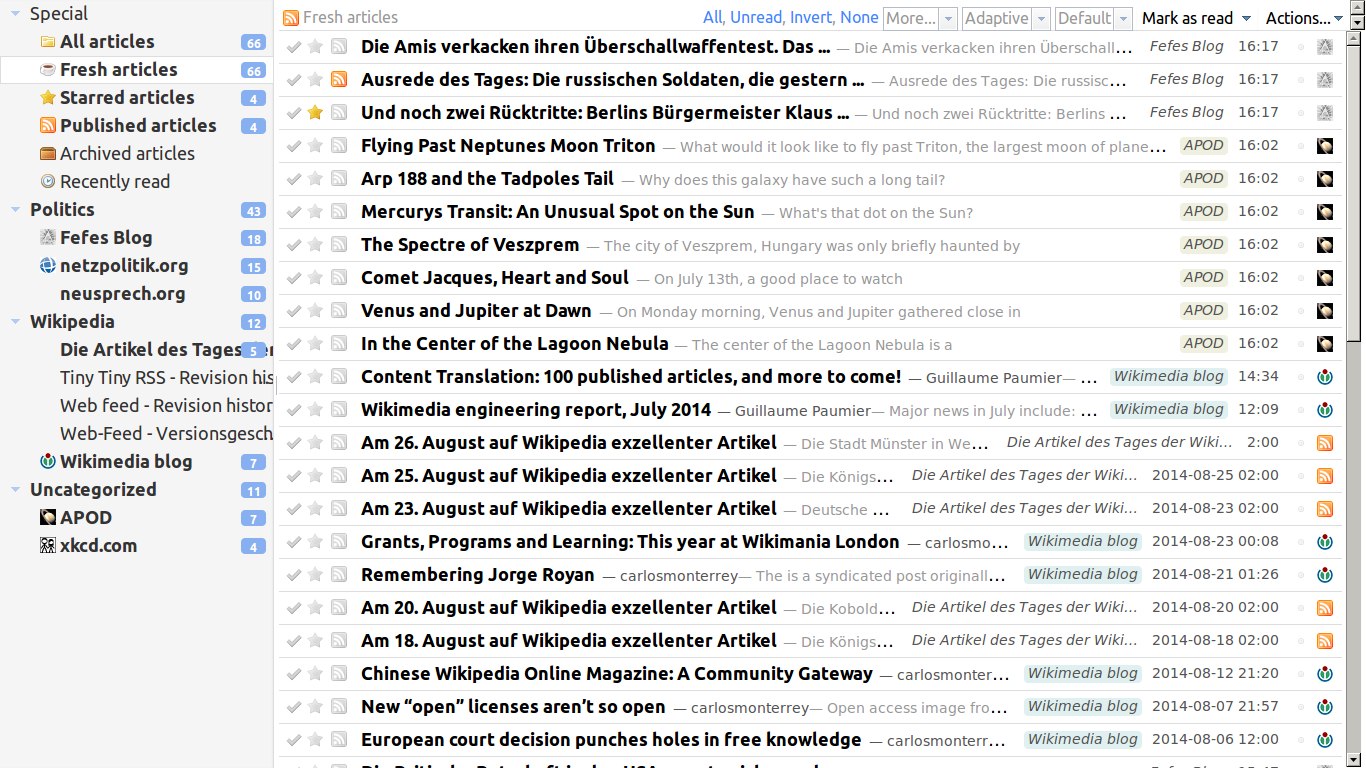
- Graphical user interface from Tiny Tiny RSS
- Developers: tt-rss project, Andrew Dolgov
- Initial release: 22 August 2005; 20 years ago
- Stable release: rolling releases (git)
- Repository: github.com/tt-rss/tt-rss
- Written in: PHP
- Type: Feed reader
- License: 2013: GPL-3.0-or-later; 2005: GPL-2.0-only
- Website: tt-rss.org

Tiny Tiny RSS is a free RSS feed reader. It is a web application which must be installed on a web server.

Following Google's announcement that they would be retiring Google Reader, Tiny Tiny RSS was widely reviewed as a possible replacement for it in major tech blogs and online magazines. Reviewers praised its versatility but criticized its performance and installation process.

== See also ==
- Comparison of feed aggregators
