= NetNewsWire =

News aggregator for macOS

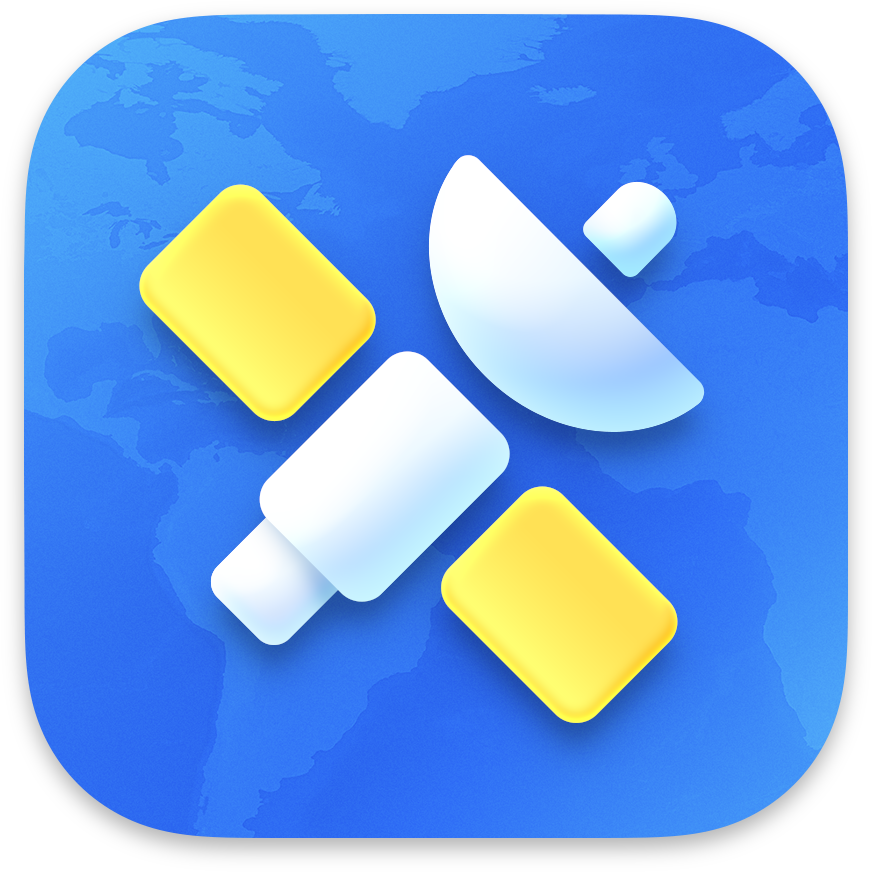
- macOS icon for NetNewsWire
- Developers: Current: Brent Simmons; Former: Black Pixel, NewsGator Technologies
- Release: July 12, 2002; 24 years ago
- Stable release: 6.1.3 / 29 June 2023
- Operating system: iOS, macOS
- Type: News aggregator
- License: MIT License
- Website: netnewswire.com
- Repository: github.com/Ranchero-Software/NetNewsWire

NetNewsWire is a free and open-source RSS reader for macOS and iOS, originally developed by Brent and Sheila Simmons through Ranchero Software. It was first introduced on in 2002 as NetNewsWire Lite, a free version with fewer features compared to the commercial release. Ownership transitioned over time, with NewsGator acquiring it in 2005 and Black Pixel in 2011, before Brent Simmons regained the intellectual property in 2018 and released his open source Mac RSS reader, "Evergreen" as NetNewsWire 5.0d1. NetNewsWire has been well received by the community, receiving awards such as Macworld's Editor's Choice.

== History ==
NetNewsWire was developed by Brent and Sheila Simmons for their company Ranchero Software. It was introduced on July 12, 2002, with NetNewsWire Lite, a free version missing some advanced features of the (then commercial) version, introduced some weeks later. Version 1.0 was released on February 11, 2003, and version 2.0 was released in May 2005. At that time it included custom feed views, custom downloading and opening of podcasts, synchronization of feeds and feed status between computers, Bloglines support, and a built-in tabbed browser.

In October 2005, NewsGator bought NetNewsWire, bringing their NewsGator Online RSS synchronization service to the Mac. Brent Simmons was hired by NewsGator to continue developing the software.

NetNewsWire 3.0 was released on June 5, 2007. The version added Spotlight indexing of news items, integration with iCal, iPhoto, Address Book, and VoodooPad, Growl support, a new user interface, performance enhancements, and more.

The application was originally shareware, but became free with the release of NetNewsWire 3.1 on January 10, 2008. NetNewsWire Lite was discontinued at the same time. NetNewsWire 3.2 moved to an advertisement-supported model with the option to purchase the application to remove ads.

An iOS version of NetNewsWire with support for the iPhone, iPod Touch and later for the iPad was released on the first day of the App Store. It included syncing of unread articles with the desktop version.

NetNewsWire Lite 4.0 was introduced on March 3, 2011, on the Mac App Store. While it misses several of the advanced features included in NetNewsWire 3.2, it includes a completely rewritten codebase which was used in the iOS version of the app and for NetNewsWire 4.0 which was released as shareware.

On June 3, 2011, the acquisition of NetNewsWire by Black Pixel was announced. For two years development had been apparently stalled, with a gap in updates from 2011 through the release of the version 4 Open Beta.

On June 24, 2013, NetNewsWire 4.0 was announced and released as an open beta by Black Pixel. This announcement also brought news that the product would be a commercial product with no free component (though the beta would be free to use through the final release).

The final release of NetNewsWire 4.0 occurred on September 3, 2015.

In 2017 support of JSON Feed was added into the code base.

On August 31, 2018, Black Pixel announced that they had returned the NetNewsWire intellectual property to Brent Simmons.

On September 1, 2018, Brent Simmons released NetNewsWire 5.0d1. It was a renamed version of his open source Mac RSS reader, "Evergreen". Almost a year later, NetNewsWire 5.0 was released on August 26, 2019 as an open source application.

On December 22, 2019, Brent Simmons started a public beta for the NetNewsWire iOS app which was distributed through TestFlight. The iOS version of NetNewsWire 5.0 was released March 9, 2020.

On March 27, 2021, Brent Simmons released NetNewsWire 6.0 for macOS along with a public beta for iOS which, again, was distributed through TestFlight.

On June 22, 2021, Brent Simmons released NetNewsWire 6.0 for iOS.

On January 27, 2026, NetNewsWire 7 for Mac was released. The headlining feature was the adoption of the Liquid Glass design for macOS 26.

== Reception ==
NetNewsWire has been well regarded by many users and reviewers. According to FeedBurner, NetNewsWire was the most popular desktop newsreader on all platforms in 2005. The software received a Macworld Editor's Choice Award in 2003 and 2005 and maintained a 4.8 out of five stars rating among reviewers at VersionTracker (now CNET). Ars Technica called NetNewsWire's built-in browser "hands-down the best of any Mac newsreader," and Walter Mossberg, technology columnist for The Wall Street Journal, said that NetNewsWire is his favorite for the Mac.

NetNewsWire 5.0 was also received well. MacStories praised the RSS reader's search engine and general stability, but lamented that some advanced features and customization options had not made it into the release, calling 5.0 "a solid foundation for the future". Gizmodo wrote that NetNewsWire 5.0 was off to a promising start, but agreed that it lacked some of the features that might be expected by a power user.

== See also ==
- List of feed aggregators
- Comparison of feed aggregators
