= NewsBlur =

American software company, founded 2009

- Company type: Private
- Industry: Software
- Founded: 2009
- Founder: Samuel Clay
- Headquarters: New York City and San Francisco, United States
- Website: newsblur.com

NewsBlur is an American software company based in New York City and San Francisco. NewsBlur is an open-source RSS reader that allows users to subscribe to various content types, including newsletters and YouTube channels, and offers features like full-article reading, story change tracking, and IFTTT integration. Available on iOS, Android, and the web, NewsBlur offers a limited free tier and a low-cost Premium plan with expanded capabilities and unlimited feeds. Furthermore, the software powering NewsBlur is available and is published in an open-source application, licensed under the MIT License. Limited access to the service is free for up to 64 sites; unlimited access is available for an annual subscription fee.

The company was founded in 2009 by Samuel Clay. In March 2013, following an announcement by Google that they would be shutting down their popular Google Reader news reader service, NewsBlur's subscriber base immediately rose from about 1,500 users to over 60,000.

== See also ==
- Comparison of feed aggregators
