= Cooliris =

American software company

Cooliris Inc.
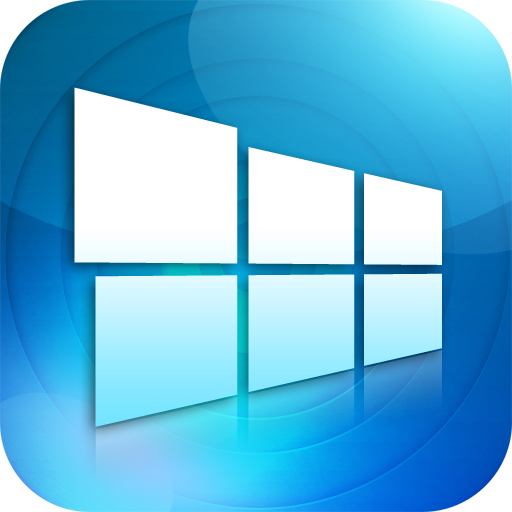
- Industry: Computer software Online media
- Founded: California (January 2006)
- Founder: Soujanya Bhumkar; Mayank Mehta; Josh Schwarzapel; Austin Shoemaker
- Defunct: November 21, 2014
- Fate: Acquired by Yahoo!
- Headquarters: San Francisco, California, United States
- Website: www.cooliris.com

Cooliris, Inc. was a US corporation headquartered in San Francisco, California, that developed photo viewing products on mobile, web, and desktop platforms. It was a venture backed by Kleiner, Perkins, Caufield & Byers, T-Venture, DAG Ventures, The Westly Group and NTT DOCOMO.

== History ==
The company was initially best known for its signature user interface, the Cooliris 3D Wall, which provided a 3D-like immersive media-viewing experience.

In January 2010, Google, Inc. tapped Cooliris to develop Android Gallery, a native photo application installed on over 40 million smartphones then running the Android operating system. The company's core product was the Cooliris mobile photo viewing and sharing app for iPad and iPhone, launched in July 2012.

On November 21, 2014, Cooliris was acquired by Yahoo!.
