= Feedly =

News aggregator

- Website type: News aggregator
- Available in: English
- Area served: Worldwide
- Website: feedly.com
- Commercial: Yes
- Registration: Yes
- Launched: 2008; 18 years ago
- Current status: Active
- Written in: Java (back-end), JavaScript, HTML, CSS (UI)

Feedly
- Developer: DevHD
- Release: 2008
- Stable release: 90.0.6 / 13 November 2023; 2 years ago
- Written in: Java (back-end), JavaScript, HTML, CSS (UI)
- Operating system: Android 5.1 or later iOS 10.0 or later (iPhone, iPad, and iPod touch)
- Platform: Web browser, mobile
- Type: News aggregator
- License: Freemium
- Website: feedly.com/news-reader

Feedly is a freemium news aggregator application for web browsers and mobile devices running Android and iOS. It is also available as a cloud-based service. It compiles news feeds from a variety of online sources for the user to customize and share with others. Feedly was first released by DevHD in 2008.

== History ==
DevHD's first project was Streets. It aggregates updates from a variety of online sources and is the basis of Feedly. Originally called Feeddo, Feedly was first released as a web extension before moving onto mobile platforms.

On March 15, 2013, Feedly announced 500,000 new users in 48 hours due to the closure announcement of Google Reader. By April 2, 2013, the total number of new users was up to 3 million. At the end of May 2013, the total user number was up to 12 million. In 2018, Feedly had 14 million registered users.

=== Denial-of-service attacks ===
On June 11–13, 2014, Feedly suffered denial-of-service attacks that prevented users from accessing their information. The attackers demanded ransom from Feedly, which the company refused to pay.

== Mobile app ==
The Feedly mobile application is available for Android and iOS devices. All versions of the app run on Streets (DevHD's other project), which allows for the application to run on the same code for all devices. Like its web counterpart, the mobile application's interface imitates a magazine spread. However, unlike the browser extension, the Feedly app cannot load an entire article. Instead, it will present a summary and a link to the actual article. The Feedly app does not support offline mode but third-party apps offer the service.

== See also ==
- Comparison of feed aggregators
