= Ping (blogging) =

Push mechanism for web content

In blogging, a ping is an XML-RPC-based push mechanism by which a weblog notifies a server that its content has been updated. An XML-RPC signal is sent from the weblog to one or more ping servers, as specified by originating weblog), to notify a list of their "services" of new content on the weblog.

A ping server may notify multiple services when pinged;

- Search engines
- Website directories
- News websites
- Aggregators
- Feed websites

== Adoptions ==
=== Server adoption ===
The technology was first introduced by Dave Winer to Weblogs.com in October 2001. The site was powered by receiving pings from individual blog and podcast websites using weblogUpdates.ping() calls over the XML-RPC protocol. The server protocol was later adopted by FeedBurner's Pingshot, Automattic's Ping-O-Matic, Google Blogsearch, Källström's Twingly, and others.

Open ping servers, like Moreover Technologies' Weblogs.com, let other web services subscribe to a list of blogs that have recently pinged them. Blog search engines can provide fresh results very quickly by polling only the newly updated blogs. Similarly, aggregators use results from ping servers to tell subscribers which items on their subscription lists have fresh material.

In addition to open ping servers, there are also proprietary ping servers that gather information only for their own applications. Most of the major blog search engines operate such ping servers, and most content management systems and blogs provide an easy way to modify ping services.

=== Client adoption ===
WordPress has included a ping client since its first release in 2003, which used Weblogs.com as its ping server until 2004. It now uses Automattic's Ping-O-Matic.

In 2005, Apple released Weblog Server as part of Mac OS X Server, which was based on the Blojsom open-source project and used Ping-O-Matic as its ping server.

In 2006, Geeklog added support for ping servers, using Ping-O-Matic by default.

As of 2016, most blog authoring tools automatically ping one or more servers each time the blogger creates a new post or updates an old one.

== Ping spam ==
The use of ping servers to direct attention to recent blog posts has led to a rash of ping spam or sping, which attempts to direct readers to web pages that are not, in fact, recent blog posts. Examples:

- Product vendors who use a weblog-like format to post product ads, meaningless batches of Google keywords, etc.
- Software vendors, who sell scripts that make automated "weblog postings" every hour around the clock.

Creators of ping spam or spam blogs may hope to benefit by creating pages to turn up in web searches for popular keywords. Typically, an individual spam post links to some external page that displays Google ads or offers a product for sale.

Although pinging adds no value to a website's rank-ability in search engines, it does help search engine Web crawlers discover content quicker, which may give it (the content) the visibility needed to attract traffic (often resulting in conversions such as sharing the website, which means additional backlinks, social shares, etc., which does help a website rank.

== See also ==
- Webmention, an alternate implementation of the pingback protocol that avoids the complexities of XML-RPC.
- Pingback, a variant of trackbacks based on the ping notification mechanism
- RSS and Atom, the main syndication formats used for blogs
