= Glossary of blogging =

This is a list of blogging terms. Blogging, like any hobby, has developed something of a specialized vocabulary. The following is an attempt to explain a few of the more common phrases and words, including etymologies when not obvious.

== Blog-related terms ==
=== A ===
Atom
A popular feed format developed as an alternative to RSS.
Autocasting
An automated form of podcasting that allows bloggers and blog readers to generate audio versions of text blogs from RSS feeds.
Audioblog
A blog where the posts consist mainly of voice recordings sent by mobile phone, sometimes with some short text messages added for metadata purposes. (cf. podcasting)

=== B ===
Beauty Blog
Beauty blogs are niche blogs that cover cosmetics, makeup or skincare related topics, events, product launches, product reviews, nail-art, makeup trends, highly curated products, insider tips from tastemakers and celebrities, et cetera.
Blawg
A blog about law and legal issues.
Bleg
An entry in a blog requesting information or contributions. A portmanteau of "blog" and "beg." also called "Lazyweb."
Blog Carnival
A blog article that contains links to other articles covering a specific topic. Most blog carnivals are hosted by a rotating list of frequent contributors to the carnival, and serve to both generate new posts by contributors and highlight new bloggers posting matter in that subject area.
Blog client
(weblog client) is software to manage (post, edit) blogs from the operating system with no need to launch a web browser. A typical blog client has an editor, a spell-checker, and a few more options that simplify content creation and editing.
Blog publishing service
A software that is used to create the blog. Some of the most popular are WordPress, Blogger, TypePad, Movable Type, and Joomla.
Blogger
Person who runs a blog. Also blogger.com, a popular blog hosting website. Rarely weblogger.
Bloggernacle
Blogs written by and for Mormons (a portmanteau of "blog" and "Tabernacle"). Generally refers to faithful Mormon bloggers and sometimes refers to a specific grouping of faithful Mormon bloggers.
Bloggies
One of the most popular blog awards
Blogroll
A list of other blogs that a blogger might recommend by providing links to them (usually in a sidebar list).
Blogosphere
All blogs, or the blogging community.
Blogware
A category of software that consists of a specialized form of a Content Management System specifically designed for creating and maintaining weblogs.
The BOBs
The largest international blog awards.

=== C ===
Catblogging (traditionally "Friday catblogging", sometime "Caturday")
The practice of posting pictures of cats, in typical cat postures and expressions, on a blog.
Collaborative blog
A blog (usually focused on a single issue or political stripe) on which multiple users enjoy posting permission. Also known as group blog.
Comment spam
Like e-mail spam. Robot “spambots” flood a blog with advertising in the form of bogus comments. A serious problem that requires bloggers and blog platforms to have tools to exclude some users or ban some addresses in comments.

=== D ===
Desktop Blogging Client
An off-line blog management (posting, editing, and archiving) tool
Domain Name
A domain name is the name of a blog/website. Google.com and Wikipedia.org are examples of blogs/websites' names.

=== E ===
Event blogging
When marketers create new blogs for upcoming events. For that, they buy EMDs or exact match domains for the upcoming events to attract people who are searching for that event. Because their domain is rich with keywords, they get better rankings in search engines. However, to establish an event blog, event bloggers may start working on their blogs 6 months or more before the event to make a decent amount of content and to get quality backlinks.

=== F ===
Fisking/To fisk
To rebut a news report line-by-line, or the result of doing so.
Flog
A portmanteau of "fake" and "blog"; a form of astroturfing.
A food blog; sometimes, a blog dedicated to food porn.
Feeds
RSS Feeds.

=== H ===
Health blog
A blog that covers health topics, events, and/or related content of the health industry and the general community. In short, anything related to health.

=== J ===
J-blog
A journalist blog.
A blog with a Jewish focus.

=== L ===
Legal blog
A blog about the law.
Lifelog
A blog that captures a person's entire life.
List blog
A blog consisting solely of list-style posts.
Listicle
A short-form of writing that uses a list as its thematic structure but is fleshed out with sufficient copy to be published as an article.
Litblog
A blog that focuses primarily on the topic of literature.

=== M ===
Milblog
A blog written by members or veterans of any branch of military service - Army, Navy, Air Force, or Marines. A contraction of military and blog.
Moblog
A portmanteau of "mobile" and "blog". A blog featuring posts sent mainly by mobile phone, using SMS or MMS messages. They are often photoblogs.
Mommy blog
A blog featuring discussions especially about home and family.
Multiblog
A blog constructed as a conversation between more than two people.

=== P ===
Permalink
Permanent link. The unique URL of a single post. Use this when you want to link to a post somewhere.
Phlog
Type of blog utilising the Gopher protocol instead of HTTP
A Photoblog. A portmanteau of "photo" and "blog".

Photoblog
A blog mostly containing photos, posted constantly and chronologically.
Pingback
The alert in the TrackBack system that notifies the original poster of a blog post when someone else writes an entry concerning the original post.
Podcasting
Contraction of “iPod” and “broadcasting” (but not for iPods only). Posting audio and video material on a blog and its RSS feed, for digital players.
Post or blog Post
A blog post is a piece of writings in the form of an article that's published on a blog by a blogger.
Post Slug
For blogs with common language URLs, the post slug is the portion of the URL that represents the post, such as "all-about-my-holiday" in www.example.com/all-about-my-holiday

=== R ===
RSS
Really Simple Syndication is a family of Web feed formats used to publish frequently updated content such as blog entries, news headlines, or podcasts.
RSS aggregator
Software or online service allowing a blogger to read an RSS feed, especially the latest posts on their favorite blogs. Also called a reader or feedreader.
RSS feed
The file containing a blog’s latest posts It is read by an RSS aggregator or reader and shows at once when a blog has been updated. It may contain only the title of the post, the title plus the first few lines of the post, or the entire post.

=== S ===
Search engine friendly URLs
or, for short, SEF URLs, implemented via URL mapping.
Spam blog
A blog that is composed of spam. A Spam blog or "any blog whose creator doesn't add any written value."
Slashdot effect
The Slashdot effect can hit blogs or another website, and is caused by a major website (usually Slashdot, but also Digg, Metafilter, Boing Boing, Instapundit and others) sending huge amounts of temporary traffic that often slow down the server.
Soldierblog
see Milblog
Subscribe
The term used when a blogs feed is added to a feed reader like Bloglines or Google. Some blogging platforms have internal subscriptions, this allows readers to receive a notification when there are new posts in a blog. A subscriber is a person who is willing to receive blogger's news and updates.

=== T ===
Templates
Templates, used on the "back end" of a blog that works together to handle information and present it on a blog.
Theme
CSS based code that when applied to the templates will result in visual element changes to the blog. The theme, as a whole, is also referred to as a blog design.
TrackBack
A system that allows a blogger to see who has seen the original post and has written another entry concerning it. The system works by sending a 'ping' between the blogs and therefore providing the alert.

=== V ===
Vlog
A video blog; a vlogger is a video blogger (e.g. someone who records himself interviewing people of a certain field).

=== W ===
Warblog
A blog devoted mostly or wholly to covering news events concerning an ongoing war.
Weblog
The unshortened version of 'blog'.
