= Serendipity (software) =

Blog and web-based content management system written in PHP

- Serendipity's official blog
- Developer: Serendipity Developer Team
- Stable release: 2.6.0 / 2026-04-10[±]
- Written in: PHP
- Operating system: Unix-like, Windows
- Platform: Cross-platform
- Type: content management system
- License: BSD-3-Clause
- Website: s9y.org
- Repository: github.com/s9y/Serendipity

Serendipity is a blog and web-based content management system written in PHP and available under a BSD license. It supports PostgreSQL, MySQL, SQLite database backends, the Smarty template engine, and a plugin architecture for user contributed modifications.

Serendipity is available through a number of "one-click install" services such as Installatron.

== Features ==
Serendipity's plugin architecture allows users to modify both the appearance of the blog and its features.

Serendipity's SPARTACUS plugin automatically checks the central repository for plugins/templates upgrades and new functionality whenever a user checks the list. Users can install more than 120 plugins.

- WYSIWYG and HTML editing
- Built-in media database, can add media from URL or local file
- Multiple authors, configurable permission/usergroup system
- Threaded comments, nested categories, post to multiple categories
- Multiple languages (internationalization)
- Online plugin and template repository for easy plug-and-play installation
- Drag-and-drop sidebar plugins organization
- Category-based sub-blogs
- Static Pages
- Podcasting
- RSS planet/aggregator
- Spam blocking
- Tag support
- One-click upgrading from any version
- Can be embedded into your existing web pages
- Standards-compliant templating through Smarty
- Remote blogging via XML-RPC
- BSD-style licensing
- Multiple Database support (SQLite, PostgreSQL, MySQL, MySQLi)
- Shared installations can power multiple blogs from just one codebase
- Native import from earlier blog applications (WordPress, Textpattern, Moveable Type, bblog, etc.)
- Search engine-friendly permalink structure
- TrackBack and Pingback
- default template for frontend and backend have responsive web design

== History ==
The Serendipity project was started by Jannis Hermanns in the winter of 2002, then still called jBlog. Due to a naming conflict with an existing blog publishing system, Sterling Hughes suggested the name serendipity. This suggestion is based on an Essay by Sam Ruby. The short form s9y stems from abbreviations such as i18n for internationalization where the number represents the amount of omitted letters. Today the project is maintained by Garvin Hicking.

== Book ==
Serendipity
- Author: Garvin Hicking
- Original title: Serendipity Individuelle Weblogs für Einsteiger und Profis
- Language: German
- Subject: Serendipity Weblog Software
- Genre: Weblog Software
- Publisher: OpenSourcePress
- Publication date: 2008
- ISBN: 978-3-937514-54-3

The first book about Serendipity was published in German by OpenSourcePress: Serendipity - Individuelle Weblogs für Einsteiger und Profis. The publisher donated the book's copyright to the Serendipity project, who has released it under a CC-BY-NC-SA license and made a GitHub repository available online.

== See also ==
- Comparison of content management systems
