= Adversarial information retrieval =

Information retrieval strategies in datasets

Adversarial information retrieval (adversarial IR) is a topic in information retrieval related to strategies for working with a data source where some portion of it has been manipulated maliciously. Tasks can include gathering, indexing, filtering, retrieving and ranking information from such a data source. Adversarial IR includes the study of methods to detect, isolate, and defeat such manipulation.

On the Web, the predominant form of such manipulation is search engine spamming (also known as spamdexing), which involves employing various techniques to disrupt the activity of web search engines, usually for financial gain. Examples of spamdexing are link-bombing, comment or referrer spam, spam blogs (splogs), malicious tagging. Reverse engineering of ranking algorithms, click fraud, and web content filtering may also be considered forms of adversarial data manipulation.

== Topics ==
Topics related to Web spam (spamdexing):

- Link spam
- Keyword spamming
- Cloaking
- Malicious tagging
- Spam related to blogs, including comment spam, splogs, and ping spam

Other topics:

- Click fraud detection
- Reverse engineering of search engine's ranking algorithm
- Web content filtering
- Advertisement blocking
- Stealth crawling
- Troll (Internet)
- Malicious tagging or voting in social networks
- Astroturfing
- Sockpuppetry

== History ==
The term "adversarial information retrieval" was first coined in 2000 by Andrei Broder (then Chief Scientist at Alta Vista) during the Web plenary session at the TREC-9 conference.

== See also ==
- Artificial intelligence content detection
- Information retrieval
- Spamdexing
