= Lloyd's Maritime and Commercial Law Quarterly =

- Discipline: Law
- Language: English
- Edited by: Francis Rose

Publication details
- History: 1974–present
- Publisher: Lloyd's List Intelligence (United Kingdom)

Standard abbreviations
- ISO 4: Lloyd's Marit. Commer. Law Q.

Indexing
- ISSN: 0306-2945

Links
- Journal homepage

Lloyd's Maritime and Commercial Law Quarterly ("LMCLQ") is a legal journal published by Lloyd's List Intelligence that publishes articles relating to commercial law and shipping law. It is currently edited by Professor Sir Francis Rose of the University of Southampton. The LMCLQ was established in 1974. The Australian Correspondent was for many years the current Chief Justice of Tuvalu, The Hon Charles Sweeney QC. The legal research repository Hein Online has described the journal as bringing its readership "in-depth discussion of current commercial law topics by some of the world’s leading legal thinkers". It is considered one of the "world's leading journals" in the area of maritime and commercial law.

As of 2013, it is the most cited English law journal in the world in the field of maritime Law.
