= Pastanjauhantaa =

Pastanjauhantaa is a popular Finnish food blog and formerly a popular blog in Finland.

== See also ==
- Pastanjauhantaa
