= Randy Charles Morin =

Randy Charles Morin is a Canadian web publisher and the former chairman of the RSS Advisory Board, a group that publishes the RSS 2.0 specification. Randy authored the RSS autodiscovery specification and contributed to the RSS profile. He also runs the TalkSports website.

In 2005, Morin began Rmail, a startup that enabled RSS feeds to be read over email. The site grew to more than 50,000 subscribers, and in April 2007 was sold to the broadcast network NBC. NBC digital media executive George Kliavkoff said the acquisition would enable the company to "make predictive understandings of what they might be interested in and start learning about RSS." NBC rebranded the service as SendMeRSS.

Morin began TalkSports after a 2005 blog post he wrote about hockey player Sidney Crosby received a comment from a female inquiring whether Crosby had a girlfriend. He explained to Drama Scene Live Radio in an interview, "Google immediately picked up that new comment and within a few days that page was getting 1,000 hits per day. And I thought, I've got an idea ..."

== Bibliography ==
He authored and co-authored several technical books.

- Programming Windows Services (2000) ISBN 0-471-38576-X
- Waite Group's COM/DCOM Primer Plus
- COM/DCOM Unleashed (1999) ISBN 0-672-31352-9
- Microsoft SQL Server 7.0 Programming Unleashed (1999) ISBN 0-672-31293-X
- COM/DCOM (Korean)
- COM/DCOM (Japanese)
- COM+ Unleashed

== In the news ==
- On January 30, 2006, Joined the RSS Advisory Board.
- On August 12, 2008, becomes chairman of the RSS Advisory Board.
