= Moreover Technologies =

Business intelligence company

- Type: Private
- Industry: Media monitoring
- Founded: 1998
- Headquarters: 1902 Campus Commons Dr, Suite 400, Reston, Virginia, 20191-1563, United States
- Parent: LexisNexis
- Website: www.moreover.com

Moreover Technologies (generally known as "Moreover") is a provider of business intelligence, media monitoring and news aggregation products for enterprises, also offering free news feeds for consumers. Moreover was founded in 1998 by Nick Denton, David Galbraith, and Angus Bankes.

In October 2014, Moreover was acquired by LexisNexis.

== History ==
Moreover became involved with developing the Really Simple Syndication (RSS) 1.0 standard in 2000 and was later acquired by VeriSign in 2005 for $30m. As part of VeriSign the Moreover business unit was renamed as Real-Time Publisher Services being paired with Weblogs.com to create a platform for publishers and bloggers to track and distribute content. In May 2009, Moreover was sold to a private investor group led by Paul Farrell. The sale included Weblogs.com with the ping server becoming wholly owned and run by Moreover.

== Current history ==
Moreover currently powers the Ask.com News Search and BBC Newstracker, having global headquarters in Reston, Virginia and further offices in Dayton, New York, San Francisco, Seattle and London; furthermore, in October 2014, Moreover was acquired by LexisNexis. LexisNexis has since integrated Moreover's flagship product, Newsdesk, into their portfolio of media intelligence solutions.

== See also ==
- Ask BigNews
- BBC News Online
