= GNSS spoofing =

Type of spoofing attack

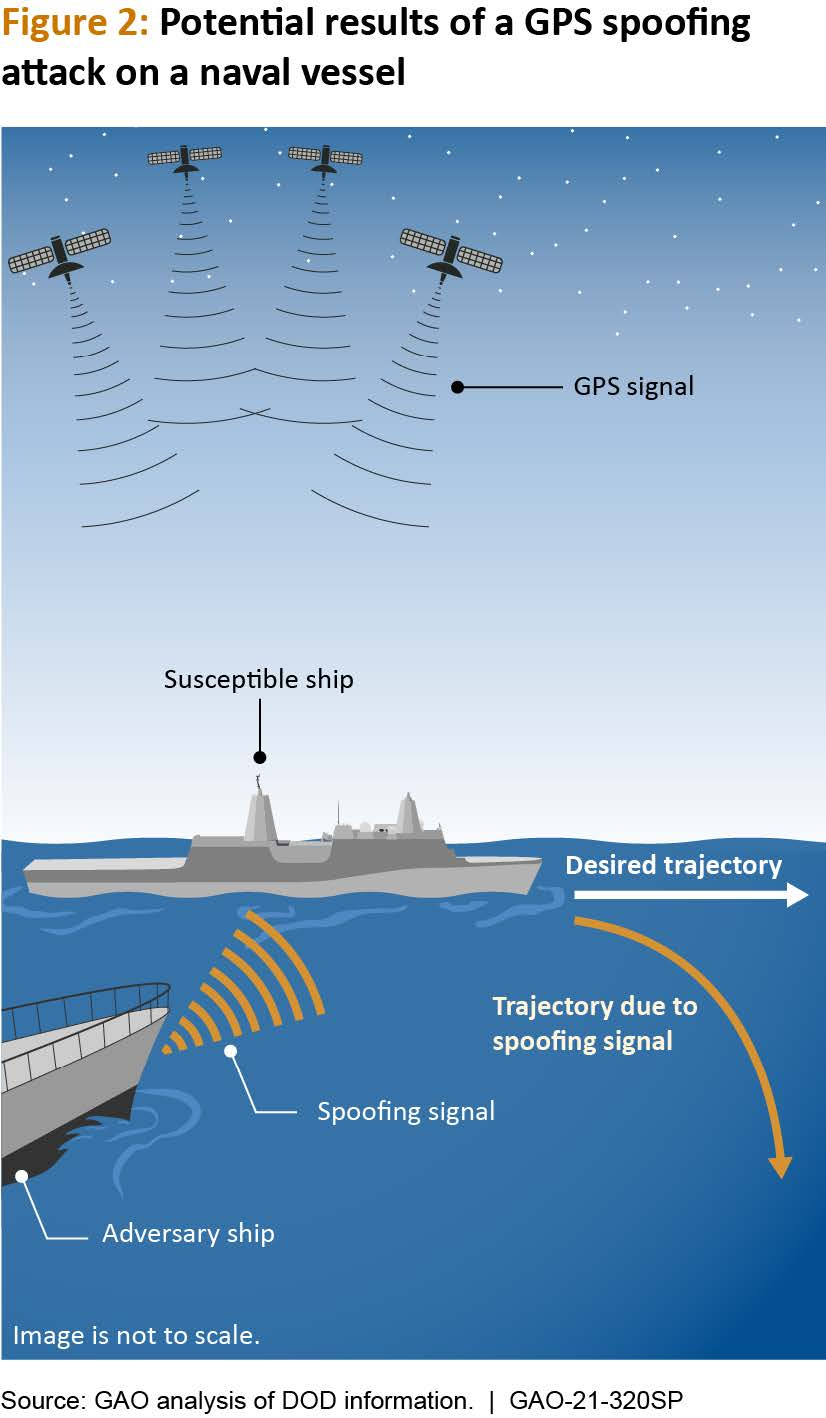
Potential use of GPS spoofing against a naval vessel

In global navigation satellite systems (GNSS), a spoofing attack attempts to deceive a GNSS receiver by broadcasting fake GPS or other GNSS signals, structured to resemble a set of normal GNSS signals, or by rebroadcasting genuine signals captured elsewhere or at a different time. GNSS spoofing is a more sophisticated and deceptive practice than GNSS jamming, which merely blocks affected devices from being able to use GNSS systems at all.

Spoofing attacks are generally hard to detect as adversaries generate counterfeit signals. These spoofed signals are challenging to recognize from legitimate signals, thus confusing ships' calculation of positioning, navigation, and timing (PNT). This means that spoofed signals may be modified in such a way as to cause the receiver to estimate its position to be somewhere other than where it actually is, or to be located where it is but at a different time, as determined by the attacker. One common form of a GNSS spoofing attack, commonly termed a carry-off attack, begins by broadcasting signals synchronized with the genuine signals observed by the target receiver. The power of the counterfeit signals is then gradually increased and drawn away from the genuine signals.

Even though GPS and other GNSS networks are among the most relied upon navigational systems, they have demonstrated critical vulnerabilities towards spoofing attacks. GNSS satellite signals have been shown to be vulnerable due to the signals' being relatively weak on Earth's surface. A reliance on GNSS could result in the loss of life, environmental contamination, navigation accidents, and financial costs. However, since 80% of global trade is moved through shipping companies, relying upon GNSS systems for navigation remains unavoidable.

As of 2022, all public-access GNSS systems, such as the US GPS, Russia's GLONASS, China's BeiDou, and Europe's Galileo constellation, are vulnerable to this technique. In order to mitigate some of the vulnerabilities the GNSS systems face concerning spoofing attacks, the use of more than one navigational system at once is recommended. In 2025, Galileo deployed a feature that allows supporting receivers to differentiate between real and forged signals using cryptography.

The term GPS spoofing may refer either to a GNSS spoofing attack or to a distinct phenomenon more accurately known as AIS spoofing or first-party spoofing, in which a vessel or aircraft deliberately broadcasts false information about its own position via AIS signals, despite its crew knowing its correct position.

== Occurrences ==
The December 2011 capture of a Lockheed RQ-170 Sentinel drone aircraft in northeastern Iran may have been the result of such an attack. GNSS spoofing attacks had been predicted and discussed in the GNSS community as early as 2003. A "proof-of-concept" attack was successfully performed in June 2013, when the luxury yacht White Rose of Drachs was misdirected with spoofed GPS signals by a group of aerospace engineering students from the Cockrell School of Engineering at the University of Texas in Austin. The students were aboard the yacht, allowing their spoofing equipment to gradually overpower the signal strengths of the actual GPS constellation satellites, altering the course of the yacht.

In 2019, the British oil tanker Stena Impero was seized by Iranian forces in the Strait of Hormuz, with the vessel, including its crew and cargo, subsequently used as pawns in a geopolitical conflict. Analysis by Lloyd's List Intelligence concluded that the ship had likely been redirected into Iranian waters by GNSS spoofing prior to the seizure.

On October 15, 2023, Israel Defense Forces (IDF) announced that GPS had been "restricted in active combat zones in accordance with various operational needs," but has not publicly commented on more advanced interference. In April 2024, however, researchers at University of Texas at Austin detected false signals and traced their origin to a particular air base in Israel run by the IDF.

=== Russian GPS spoofing ===
In June 2017, approximately twenty ships in the Black Sea complained of GPS anomalies, showing vessels to be transpositioned miles from their actual location, in what Professor Todd Humphreys believed was most likely a spoofing attack. GPS anomalies around Putin's Palace and the Moscow Kremlin, demonstrated in 2017 by a Norwegian journalist on air, have led researchers to believe that Russian authorities use GPS spoofing wherever Vladimir Putin is located.

The mobile systems named Borisoglebsk-2, Krasukha and Zhitel are reported to be able to spoof GPS.

Incidents involving Russian GPS spoofing include during a November 2018 NATO exercise in Finland that led to ship collision (unconfirmed by authorities). and a 2019 incident of spoofing from Syria by the Russian military that affected the civil airport in Tel Aviv.

In December 2022 significant GPS interference in several Russian cities was reported by the GPSJam service; the interference was attributed to defensive measures taken by Russian authorities in the wake of the invasion of Ukraine.

As of 2026, Lloyd's List Intelligence reported that the Black Sea, the Sea of Azov, Russian ports in the Baltic Sea and Arctic Ocean, and the Red Sea near Sudan were the areas where signs of GNSS spoofing were being seen "most intensely and frequently" in ship AIS signals, and that the practice had become more difficult to detect over the past year.

== GPS spoofing with SDR ==
Since the advent of software-defined radio (SDR), GPS simulator applications have been made available to the general public. This has made GPS spoofing much more accessible, meaning it can be performed at limited expense and with a modicum of technical knowledge. Whether this technology applies to other GNSS systems remains to be demonstrated.

== Prevention ==
=== Receiver modification ===
The Department of Homeland Security, in collaboration with the National Cybersecurity and Communications Integration Center (NCCIC) and the National Coordinating Center for Communications (NCC), released a paper which lists methods to prevent this type of spoofing. Some of the most important and most recommended to use are:

1. Obscure antennas. Install antennas where they are not visible from publicly accessible locations or obscure their exact locations by introducing impediments to hide the antennas.
2. Add a sensor/blocker.
  - Sensors can detect characteristics of interference, jamming, and spoofing signals, provide local indication of an attack or anomalous condition, communicate alerts to a remote monitoring site, and collect and report data to be analyzed for forensic purposes.
  - Blockers are used to attenuate horizon-level signals, which are more likely to come from a (ground-based) spoofer than an overhead signal. This feature can be integrated into the antenna design (a horizon-blocking antenna). A much more advanced approach along these lines is the controlled reception pattern antenna, which can continually reshape its receptive field to "tune out" jammers and spoofers and to focus on real signals.
3. Extend data spoofing whitelists to sensors. Existing data spoofing whitelists have been and are being implemented in government reference software, and should also be implemented in sensors.
4. Use more GNSS signal types. Modernized civil GPS signals are more robust than the L1 signal and should be leveraged for increased resistance to interference, jamming, and spoofing.
5. Reduce latency in recognition and reporting of interference, jamming, and spoofing. If a receiver is misled by an attack before the attack is recognized and reported, then backup devices may be corrupted by the receiver before hand-over.

These installation and operation strategies and development opportunities can significantly enhance the ability of GPS receivers and associated equipment to defend against a range of interference, jamming, and spoofing attacks.

A system- and receiver-agnostic detection software offers applicability as cross-industry solution. Software implementation can be performed in different places within the system, depending on where the GNSS data is being used, for example as part of the device's firmware, operating system, or on the application level.

==== Checking against other data ====
A method proposed by researchers from the Department of Electrical and Computer Engineering at the University of Maryland, College Park and the School of Optical and Electronic Information at Huazhong University of Science and Technology that aims to help mitigate the effects of GNSS spoofing attacks by using data from a vehicles controller area network (CAN) bus. The information would be compared to that of received GNSS data and compared in order to detect the occurrence of a spoofing attack and to reconstruct the driving path of the vehicle using that collected data. Properties such as the vehicles speed and steering angle would be amalgamated and regression modeled in order to achieve a minimum error in position of 6.25 meters. Similarly, a method outlined by researchers in a 2016 IEEE Intelligent Vehicles Symposium conference paper discuss the idea of using cooperative adaptive cruise control (CACC) and vehicle to vehicle (V2V) communications in order to achieve a similar goal. In this method, the communication abilities of both cars and radar measurements are used to compare against the supplied GNSS position of both cars to determine the distance between the two cars which is then compared to the radar measurements and checked to make sure they match. If the two lengths match within a threshold value, then no spoofing has occurred, but above this threshold, the user is notified so that s/he can take action.

In maritime navigation, increasing GNSS spoofing and jamming incidents have led operators to adopt resilient navigation technologies including inertial navigation systems and fibre-optic gyrocompasses (FOG). These systems can maintain heading and motion data independently of satellite signals and may support radar plotting, collision avoidance, and autopilot functions during GNSS disruption.

In space navigation where more and more satellites also use GNSS receivers for direct positioning, Star Tracker can be used to detect GNSS spoofing attempts and maintaining the positioning and orbit determination by the provided positions.

=== Signal modification ===
==== Encryption ====
Military GNSS signals are encrypted, making them unreadable to those who do not have the encryption key. Encryption also prevents spoofing as an apparently valid signal cannot be produced without the key.

==== Digital signature ====
Civilian GNSS signals are not encrypted and their formats are public to ensure that everyone can decode them. This also makes them subject to spoofing because a malicious party can use the format to construct seemingly-valid navigational signals. As a result, there needs to be a way to ensure the authenticity of the data without obscuring its content. Cryptographic signatures are commonly used to ensure the authenticity of digital data without encrypting it. The publisher of the data holds a private key and publishes the corresponding public key. The public key can be used by any member of the public to verify that a signature for a piece of data comes from the publisher. At the same time, attackers without access to the private key are unable to forge a signature. In the context of GNSS, a satellite can possibly broadcast a cryptographic signature along with the navigational data, therefore allowing the receiver to verify that the message is real.

Galileo has deployed an authentication scheme on its open service. A different "Chimera" scheme was scheduled for test in GPS L1C in 2023, but there has been no further updates since then.

Signature schemes only protect against spoofing (fake signals). They cannot help against GNSS jamming (drowning out the real signal) and hence is not sufficient for fully assured navigation.

===== Galileo Open Service Navigation Message Authentication =====
Galileo's open service includes an Open Service Navigation Message Authentication (OSNMA) feature where the navigational data is signed using the Timed Efficient Stream Loss-Tolerant Authentication (TESLA) scheme. It is available to worldwide users for free. The OSNMA service is operational since July 24, 2025.

===== QZSS =====
QZSS includes two open service digital signature schemes: signatures for its own PNT signals broadcast as part of its PNT navigation messages and signatures for GPS and Galileo PNT signals broadcast on its L6E band along with the MADOCA-PPP service. The former tells the user whether the QZSS PNT signal is the same as was broadcast. The latter tells the user whether the GPS or Galileo PNT signal is the same as the QZSS ground station has received. It has been operational since 2024.

== See also ==
- Cybersecurity in space
