= Jenny Levine =

Jenny Levine may refer to:

- Jenny Levine (librarian), American librarian and digital strategist
- Jenny Cooper nee Levine (born 1974), Canadian actress

== See also ==
- Jennifer Levin (died 1986), victim of American murderer Robert Chambers
