= Imooty.eu =

Imooty.eu is the first aggregator to concentrate on European news, launched in August 2007. It aggregates stories from traditional news sources as well as independent blogs, and currently includes feeds from across the European Union, as well as non-member countries. Its interface allows users to access news by region, both in English and in local languages, and was founded by Blaise Bourgeois and Kristoffer J. Lassen. It is currently based in Berlin.
