= Webmention =

Open standard for linkback notifications

- Status: W3C Recommendation
- First published: January 12, 2017
- Organization: World Wide Web Consortium
- Editors: Aaron Parecki
- Base standards: HTTP, URI
- Related standards: Microformats, h-entry
- Domain: Social web, communications protocol
- Website: www.w3.org/TR/webmention/

Webmention is a W3C recommendation that describes a simple protocol to notify any URL when a website links to it, and for web pages to request notifications when somebody links to them. Webmention was originally developed in the IndieWebCamp community and published as a W3C working draft on January 12, 2016. As of January 12, 2017 it is a W3C recommendation. Webmention enables authors to keep track of who is linking to, referring to, or commenting on their articles. By incorporating such comments from other sites, sites themselves provide federated commenting functionality.

To send a Webmention, the sender discovers the receiver's endpoint from an HTTP Link header or an HTML <link>...</link> or <a>...</a> element whose rel value is webmention. It then sends the source and target URLs to that endpoint as form-encoded parameters.

Similar to pingback, Webmention is one of four types of linkbacks, but was designed to be simpler than the XML-RPC protocol that pingback relies upon, by instead only using HTTP and x-www-urlencoded content. Beyond previous linkback protocols, Webmention also specifies protocol details for when a page that is the source of a link is deleted, or updated with new links or removal of existing links.

== See also ==
- Pingback, the XML-RPC based protocol that Webmention was modeled after.
- Refback, a similar protocol but easier than Pingbacks since the site originating the link doesn't have to be capable of sending a Pingback request.
- Trackback, a similar protocol but more prone to Sping (Trackback spam) since there is no authentication or verification possible with Trackbacks.
