= BBC News Online =

Website of British news

- BBC News Online homepage (as it appears to British viewers) in February 2024
- Website type: News
- Available in: 32 languages
- Owner: BBC
- Website: www.bbc.co.uk/news/; www.bbc.com/news/
- Advertising: Yes (International edition only)
- Commercial: No
- Registration: Required for some services
- Launched: 4 November 1997; 29 years ago
- Current status: Online
- OCLC number: 50165437

BBC News Online is the website of BBC News, the division of the public-service British Broadcasting Corporation (BBC) responsible for newsgathering and production. It is "Britain's most popular online news destination", used by 62% of the country's internet users for news. (Note: As of 2022) There is also an international edition of the site which receives 1.2 billion monthly website visits worldwide, (Note: As of April 2021) making it is one of the most popular news websites globally.

The website contains global news coverage, as well as British, entertainment, science, lifestyle and political news, by the BBC's digital editorial team. Many reports are accompanied by audio and video from the BBC's television and radio news services, while the latest TV and radio bulletins are also available to view or listen to on the site together with other current affairs programmes. The website's text output is also fed to BBC Red Button.

The domestic version of BBC News Online is closely linked to its sister department website, that of BBC Sport. Both sites follow similar layout and content options and respective journalists work alongside each other. Location information provided by users is also shared with the website of BBC Weather to provide local content.

== History ==
The original BBC News website design, May 1998

The website was launched on 4 November 1997, and was headed by founding editor Mike Smartt and Project Director Bob Eggington. The broader editorial team was brought together from within the BBC, from print journalism and from some online sites.

The BBC had previously created special websites marking the 1995 Budget, the 1996 Olympic Games, 1997 general election, and the death of Princess Diana in 1997, but nothing on the scale of the launch of the main site itself, which required the development of a completely new production system, for which a team, led by Matthew Karas, was specially hired. Until that point, most BBC news staff were broadcasters and the only text-based journalists were those running Ceefax.

The original design was created by a team, including Matt Jones, and was based on designs by Mike Bennett and design studio Sunbather. Sunbather worked with consultancy Lambie-Nairn, who looked after the overall brand, and has been redesigned several times mainly to match the visual style of BBC News television bulletins and to exploit increases in readers' typical screen resolutions. A major overhaul in 2003, primarily by Paul Sissons and Maire Flynn, coincided with a relaunch of the BBC News Channel (then BBC News 24) and featured a wider page design. The site launched a set of semi-official RSS 0.91 syndication feeds in June 2003 and upgraded them to full feed RSS 2.0 in 2008. Each news index has its own RSS feed, including the in-depth sections.

The overseas version of the website, originally called BBC News Online World Edition, launched in 2002 as a separate feed to the default site for visitors in Britain.

In 2004 the BBC News website partnered with Moreover Technologies, in a response to the 2003 Graf Report, to provide links from BBC articles to rival publishers. While the BBC does not censor or change results, the algorithms used tend to give greater weight to national and international sources over regional or local ones.

Mike Smartt, who became editor in chief in 2000, was later succeeded by Pete Clifton who was subsequently promoted to Head of BBC News Interactive and replaced by the previous editor Steve Herrmann in 2005. The BBC News Interactive was also responsible for Ceefax teletext service and CBBC Newsround amongst others.

The BBC began providing real-time global user information in June 2006.

A restructuring of BBC News starting in 2007 saw the dissolution of the separate BBC News Interactive department; the editorial and management departments joined the new multimedia newsroom along with television and radio news within BBC Television Centre.

BBC News Online logo used from 2008 to 2019

New features were gradually introduced, including the publicising of video content more prominently. From May 2007, the website began to offer a live video stream of BBC News 24, the rolling news channel now known as the BBC News channel. In line with the introduction of new features across BBC Online, including a new navigation bar, the site was updated in 2008 with wider centred page designs, larger images and an increased emphasis on audio and visual content.

Beginning on 30 April 2009, some published stories included in-text links, mostly to in-site profile articles on people, locations and organisations. The BBC announced on 19 November 2009 that it was to pay more attention to search engine optimisation by extending news headlines.

On 14 July 2010, the site was completely redesigned, with the vertical section headings moved to run horizontally near the top of the page. The new design, incorporating larger in-line videos within news articles and standardised font usage, was introduced as a first step to bringing the entire BBC website into line with its new style guidelines. It was met with mixed opinions; Stephen Fry stated his approval of the redesign, and the new design was praised for being "more attractive [and] graphically stronger". However, there was also criticism, with some stating that the use of white space was too widespread and led to the need for continuous and excessive scrolling.

BBC News Online logo used from 2019 to 2022

On 4 March 2014, the BBC launched a beta version of the website that was built around the principles of responsive web design, allowing the presentation of content to adjust automatically for a wide variety of screen sizes, from desktop computer to smartphones and tablet devices. The new design went live on 23 March 2015.

The online web version of the Newsbeat radio programme moved to the main BBC News site in 2018, available to readers in Britain.

In May 2023, the BBC launched BBC Verify on the website, a fact-checking and verification brand and team that go through stories and claims in an effort to combat disinformation.

On 26 June 2025, the BBC implemented an online paywall for its U.S.-based visitors to the website. It would later expand the paywall to Canada in the summer of 2026.

== Editions ==
There are two different editions of the site. The UK edition gives prominence to national stories. All Internet users with IP addresses originating from Britain and its Crown Dependencies are served the UK edition. On the other hand, all others receive the International edition, which prioritises international news and itself has versions tailored to U.S., European and Asian audiences. The international version is run by a separate core team of journalists: it is operated by BBC Global News Ltd., the for-profit BBC subsidiary that operates the BBC World News television channel, and also contains advertising.

== Features ==
=== Columnists ===
The blog style used on BBC News Online

BBC News Online uses a blog-style system for correspondents to write articles within their specialism. Journalists including Nick Robinson and Kamal Ahmed use blogs to provide updates on current events and topics. Editors also provide entries within the "Editors' blog", giving explanations for editorial decisions as well as announcing new features or services. Members of the public are also given the opportunity to comment on entries from journalists and editors.

Prior to the adoption of the blog-style, BBC News Online also had a number of topic-specific columns written by BBC journalists, such as former education correspondent Mike Baker's Mike Baker Weekly, and technology commentator Bill Thompson's bill board (formerly bill blog). BBC News Online Science Writer Ivan Noble, diagnosed with a malignant brain tumour in August 2002, shared his experiences of cancer in Tumour Diary until his death on 31 January 2005.

=== Magazine ===
The "Magazine" is a section of BBC News Online that includes a number of articles that are not tied to a particular event or topic, unlike the other articles on the site. The editor is Jonathan Duffy, who took over from Giles Wilson in April 2006.

A major part of the magazine was the "Magazine Monitor" column, which took an irreverent view on the day's news. It usually included the "Paper Monitor", which provided a commentary on the daily press in the United Kingdom. During the day a series of caption competitions and oddities were added. On weekday evenings at around 5 p.m. GMT, letters from readers, both serious and light-hearted, were published. Topics could be varied: comments on news stories; how to measure sizes in terms of London AEC Routemaster buses, or for larger geographical areas, Wales; spotting people mentioned in news stories whose name is particularly appropriate for their job, etc. Other favourite areas of discussion included the Flexicon, the gender of Paper Monitor or coming up with sardonic comments about previous letters.

On Friday evenings, ready for Saturday morning, an article called "10 things we didn't know last week" collated odd and interesting facts from the week's news. Readers were encouraged to send their own images depicting ten objects to accompany the facts; past examples have included 10 swans flying in formation and 10 toes.

Since a redesign of the BBC News Online in September 2006, the Magazine Monitor followed a blog-style layout, rather than as a page updated over the week in a similar way to news articles. Comments were allowed, but not published, other than a selection in the daily letters.

On 28 September 2016, the BBC News Magazine was rolled into the broader BBC Stories topic, which itself closed on 19 September 2020.

=== Have Your Say ===
Have Your Say (HYS) is a discussion message board on the BBC News website allowing readers to post comments and opinions on select articles. The feature has been present since the beginning of the website.

=== On This Day ===
On This Day is the name of the BBC's news archive website. It contains an online digital library of news stories reported by the BBC on the Second World War and world events from the 1950s to 2005. There are entries for every day of the year, many including video or audio reports which can be viewed online. The stories are arranged by years, by themes, by witness accounts and by the correspondents reporting the stories. The front page used to be refreshed daily with past events from the current date, but the site is no longer maintained. Unlike the rest of BBC News Online, it still has a working text only version.

=== Embedded video and audio ===
The launch of the BBC iPlayer, with the new Adobe Flash based BBC Embedded Media Player in July 2007 enabled BBC News and Sport Online to change the way it presented video content. Previously the site had delivered online video content using embedded RealPlayer video in pop-up windows branded as the BBC News Player. From March 2008 the BBC began to gradually introduce embedded video using the EMP into individual news articles and onto the front page. The news player also provides constant live streaming of the BBC News channel via the website. This had previously only been viewable in a separate window.

=== Mobile and text only versions ===
Previously, in addition to the standard website with embedded video and audio, there were XHTML and WAP versions optimised for users on mobile devices. A text-only version of the main news website could be accessed via the BBC Betsie text to speech parser (now discontinued).

In March 2010 the BBC announced that the low graphics and PDA versions of the site would be discontinued. As of May 2010 these versions of the site are no longer available and redirect to the main and mobile websites respectively.

As of 23 March 2015, separate mobile and text only versions have been removed, and replaced with a "responsive web design", allowing the presentation of content to adjust automatically for a wide variety of screen sizes, from desktop computer to smartphones and tablet devices.

However the low-graphics version of the On This Day pages does still work, as do the text versions of articles linked from it.

The BBC also have mobile apps for news and sport, available on the Android, iOS and Windows Phone systems. The news app launched in 2010, originally for the iPhone and iPad, followed by other providers. In January 2015, it was redesigned to include the option to play video and further links within articles to others.

== Awards ==
From 1998 to 2001 the site was named best news website at the BAFTA Interactive Entertainment Awards when the award category was withdrawn. In 2012, it was awarded best site for news-led journalism at the Online Media Awards in London.

It has also previously won both the Judges' award and the People's Voice award for best news site at the annual international Webby Awards. In 2011, BBC News won an international award for excellence in online journalism.

== Criticism ==
The site is primarily funded by the television licence, and used to carry no advertising. The World edition has received some subsidy from the UK's Foreign, Commonwealth and Development Office through its grant-in-aid to the BBC World Service. Proposals to include advertising on the international version of the website were discussed by the BBC Trust in February 2007, but were opposed by BBC journalists, who feared it would weaken public trust in the impartiality of the BBC. In October 2007, it was confirmed that the site would start to carry advertising. The advertising consists of large animated banners, which has led to complaints that these make the site's content harder to read.

It was reported in 2006 that the impartiality of the Have Your Say forums was disputed by the website News Sniffer: moderators have been accused of sometimes appearing to promote their own agenda.

Have Your Say received much criticism in 2009 for featuring the question "Should homosexuals face execution?" The BBC later removed it and apologised after the BBC Pride board lobbied against it and Eric Joyce, the Labour MP for Falkirk, called it "more than offensive" and "completely unacceptable".
