= Bloxsom =

Bloxsom or Bloxsome is a British surname, possessed by a surviving line of Bloxsome's in Australia who originally immigrated from Europe in the late 19th century to early 20th century.

Notable people with either spelling of the surname include:

- Felix Bloxsom, Australian musician and songwriter

== See also ==
- Blosxom, a type of software.
