= Linkback =

Method of notifications for web authors

A linkback is a method for Web authors to obtain notifications when other authors link to one of their documents. This enables authors to keep track of who is linking to, or referring to, their articles. The four methods (refback, trackback, pingback and webmention) differ in how they accomplish this task.

== Overview ==
"Linkback" is the generalized term used to reference four methods of communication between websites. While sometimes confused with one another, linkbacks and backlinks are not the same type of entity. A backlink is what the person referring to a page creates while a linkback is what the publisher of the page being referred to receives.

Any of the four terms—linkback, trackback, pingback, or (rarely) refback—might also refer colloquially to items within a section upon the linked page that display the received notifications, usually along with a reciprocal link; trackback is used most often for this purpose. Also, the word trackback is often used colloquially to mean any kind of linkback.

	Refback	Trackback	Pingback	Webmention
Trigger mechanism	Visitor to linking site clicks on the link, and their browser takes them to the linked site	Code on linking server examines added or updated documents, extracts links, and sends notification to linked server for each link found	Code on linking server examines added or updated documents, extracts links, and sends notification to linked server for each link found	Code on linking server examines added or updated documents, extracts links, and sends notification to linked server for each link found
Notification medium	HTTP referrer value	HTTP POST	XML-RPC call	HTTP POST with source and target parameters
Capture mechanism	Examination of incoming HTTP referrer values	Trackback capture script	XML-RPC function	Webmention capture script
Information sent by linking server	None	Linking site name (Optional); Linking post title (Optional); Linking post excerpt (Optional); Linking post URL	Linked post URL; Linking post URL	Linked post URL (target); Linking post URL (source)
Additional information presented to linked server	HTTP referrer sent by a visitor's browser upon clicking the link	IP address of linking server	IP address of linking server	IP address of linking server
Autodiscovery mechanism (how the linking server finds out how and where to send the notification)	None	LINK tag in the header of the linked page or trackback RDF documents	Special HTTP header or LINK tag on the linked page	HTTP Link header or link element on the linked page
Action required when notification is received	Extract referrer value from incoming HTTP headers; Retrieve referring page; Parse retrieved page for desired information	Gather desired information from; Given parameters; or retrieving and parsing the given URL	Retrieve page at "linking post URL"; Parse retrieved page for desired information	Verifying that linking page does indeed link to linked page is recommended, not explicitly required
Advantages	Requires no special code on linking server (the link itself becomes the notification when someone clicks on it)	All the information desired by the linked server (Linking site name, post title, excerpt) is present in the notification itself	Notification mechanism has a complete technical specification; Less susceptible to spamming	Uses well-known parts of HTTP wherever possible (autodiscovery, encoding of data, response status); Reuses pingback's existing semantics; Minimum amount of data transferred on-the-wire
Disadvantages	No notification unless someone actually clicks on the link; Relies upon visitors' browsers sending proper HTTP referrer information; Linked site must retrieve and parse linking site's page to extract the information it wants	Notification requires positive action by linking server; Notification mechanism has only a partial technical specification; Autodiscovery information may prevent XHTML validation	Notification requires positive action by linking server; Linked site must retrieve and parse linking site's page to extract the information it wants; Can be abused for DDOS attacks	Notification requires positive action by linking server; Linked site must retrieve and parse linking site's page to extract the information it wants; Relatively new, so less widely implemented

== See also ==
- Backlink
- PageRank
- Search engine optimization
