= CRPA =

CRPA can mean:

- Controlled reception pattern antenna
- California Rifle and Pistol Association
