= Rael Dornfest =

American computer programmer and author

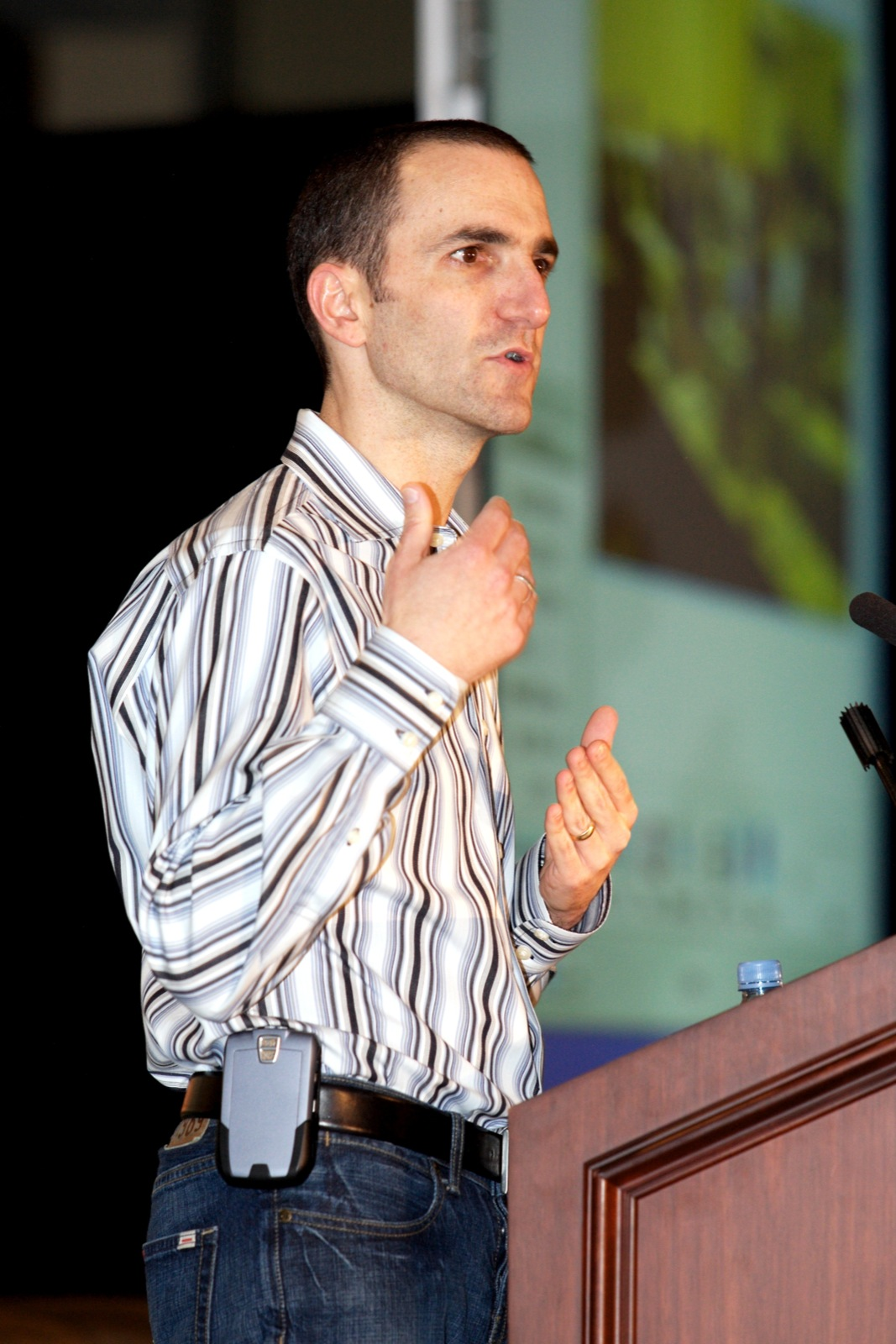
Rael Dornfest at the 2006 O'Reilly Emerging Technology Conference.

Rael Dornfest is an American computer programmer and author. He was a technical fellow and CTO of Charity: Water, and was previously an engineer at Twitter. He was founder and chief executive officer of Values of N, creator of "I Want Sandy" and "Stikkit: Little Yellow Notes that Think." Previously, he was chief technology officer at O'Reilly Media. He began working for Twitter after they bought the assets of his company Values of N.

He led the RSS-DEV Working Group, which authored RSS 1.0 and is the author of Blosxom, a lightweight Perl-based publishing system.

He was series editor of O'Reilly's Hacks series, and has coauthored a number of books including Google Hacks (ISBN 0-596-00447-8), Mac OS X Panther Hacks (ISBN 0-596-00718-3), and Google: The Missing Manual (ISBN 0-596-00613-6).
