= TalkSports =

- Website type: User-generated sports website, online forum
- Available in: English
- Owner: Rapid Spiral Development
- Commercial: Yes
- Launched: 2005

TalkSports is a user-generated sports site run by Rapid Spiral Development that has attracted controversy because of gossip and photos contributed by users about the private lives of professional athletes. The web site contains forums for every major sport athlete where fans can discuss, post pictures and links. "We get a lot of comments about players cheating or whether he has a big or small you-know-what," site publisher Randy Charles Morin told The Globe and Mail. The website was featured in the Washington Post and Canoe.ca websites.

Morin began the site after a blog post he wrote about hockey player Sidney Crosby in 2005 received a comment from a female asking whether Crosby had a girlfriend. He said in an interview with Drama Scene Live Radio, "Google immediately picked up that new comment and within a few days that page was getting 1,000 hits per day. And I thought, I've got an idea ..."

A 2014 profile of the site in ESPN the Magazine called its visual design "anachronistic, like an Angelfire page that was never snuffed out."

== Legal issues ==
TalkSports is often the target of legal challenges by sports athletes and their agents, with Morin telling ESPN he's received lawsuit threats "several hundred times." Some of the threats include:

- CAA, the agent of Warrick Dunn has sent TalkSports several cease and desist orders claiming that TalkSports does not have the right to use Warrick Dunn's name or image without permission. They claim it infringes on common law trademark rights.
- EAG, the agent of Shaun Phillips is organizing legal action against TalkSports and using their relationship with NBC to get the creator TalkSports fired from his contract with NBC.
- McGuireWoods, the agent of Israel Idonije, is threatening legal action against TalkSports unless they stop publishing the Idonije webpage on TalkSports.
- Landmark, the agent of Morris Peterson, threatened legal action against TalkSports when someone posted Peterson's phone number on the website.
- Younger, the agent of Steven Jackson, threatened legal action against TalkSports unless they deleted all webpages from the website that used Steven's name.
- Eric Cairns' lawyers Robinson, McCallum, McKerracher, Graham have threatened to sue Rapid Spiral Development and Randy Charles Morin over comments posted on Talk-Sports.
- Lawyers for Terrence Wheatley have sent TalkSports an email saying that the website violates his privacy rights and they may take legal action.

Morin said he has given hundreds of athletes free site memberships that allow them to delete comments.
