= Active antenna =

Electric antennae

An active antenna is an antenna that contains active electronic components such as transistors, as opposed to most antennas which only consist of passive components such as metal rods, capacitors and inductors. Active antenna designs allow antennas of limited size to have a wider frequency range (bandwidth) than passive antennas, and are primarily used in situations where a larger passive antenna is either impractical, such as inside a portable radio or on a vehicle, or impossible, such as in a suburban residential area with restrictions on large outdoor antennas.

Most active antennas consist of a short conventional antenna, such as a small whip antenna, connected to an active component (usually a FET). The active circuit compensates for the signal attenuation caused by the mismatch between antenna size and signal wavelength. The active circuit consists of an impedance translating stage and an optional amplification stage. This arrangement is especially useful for constructing low frequency antennas which, due to budgetary, spatial, or practical requirements, must be kept compact.

Power for the active components may be supplied by batteries, a filtered power supply, or through the signal feeder itself (phantom power). Antennas containing active impedance translating and (optionally) amplifying stages are usually used only for receiving, since operation of such stages is unidirectional.

== See also ==
- Smart antenna
- Controlled reception pattern antenna
