= Weblogs.com =

Weblogs.com is a website created by UserLand Software and later maintained by Dave Winer. It launched in late 1999 as a free, registration-based web crawler monitoring weblogs, was converted into a ping-server in October 2001, and came to be used by most blog applications. Web-services like Feedster and Technorati monitor Weblogs.com for its list of the latest blog posts, generated in response to pings via XML-RPC. The site also provided free hosting to many early bloggers.

== History ==
In mid-June 2004, there was a short outage as services transitioned between providers. Criticism from many bloggers was intense as many users initially feared their data was lost. Dave Winer, who had originally promised to get the blogs back up and running within a two-week period, was able to restore them much faster thanks to help from Rogers Cadenhead.

According to Wired Magazine, "What was decried as the death of a blog universe when Dave Winer shut down free blog host Weblogs.com turned out to be little more than a four-day server outage surrounded by a heck of a flame war."

In October, 2005, VeriSign bought the Weblogs.com ping-server from Winer, promising that services currently free there would still be free. The podcasting-related web site audio.weblogs.com was also included in the $2.3 million deal.

In May 2009 Weblogs.com was sold to a private investor group as part of the deal that saw Moreover Technologies divested from VeriSign.

== See also ==
- Pingback
