= Sping =

Spam ping

Sping is short for "spam ping", and is related to pings from blogs using trackbacks, called trackback spam. Pings are messages sent from blog and publishing tools to a centralized network service (a ping server) providing notification of newly published posts or content. Spings, or ping spam, are pings that are sent from spam blogs, or are sometimes multiple pings in a short interval from a legitimate source, often tens or hundreds per minute, due to misconfigured software, or a wish to make the content coming from the source appear fresh.

Spings, like spam blogs, are increasingly problematic for the blogging community. Estimates from Weblogs.com and Matt Mullenweg's Ping-o-Matic! service have put the sping rate—the percentage of pings that are sent from spam blogs—well above 50%. A study commissioned by Ebiquity Group and conducted by the University of Maryland in 2006 confirmed that these numbers are around 75%. Since then, growth in sping has slowed, such that the portion of pings that are spam has dropped to 53%.

The term was popularized by David Sifry from Technorati in his February 2006 State of the Blogosphere report, but was coined initially in September 2005 by a French SEO blogger, Sébastien Billiard, in an article titled "Spam 2.0".

== See also ==
- Spam in blogs
- Referrer spam
