= Mike Smartt =

British journalist

Mike Smartt OBE is a British journalist and broadcaster, and was the founder and editor-in-chief of BBC News Online, the BBC's Internet news service. With Project Director Bob Eggington, he led the team that launched the service in 1997, and held the post of editor-in-chief of BBC News Interactive, which also encompassed interactive television news, until 2004. During this time, News Online won all four interactive news BAFTA awards (the category was scrapped after the fourth win) and most of the world's online news prizes, including the US-based so-called Webby "internet Oscars" on a number of occasions.

Originally, many had doubts about the feasibility of the web service, including Smartt's friend and BBC World Editor John Simpson, who described the project as sounding "quite nerdy". Later Simpson conceded that News Online had become one of the main outlets for his work. At the 2003 European Online Journalism Awards, Smartt received an award for outstanding contribution to online journalism in Europe, and in 2004 he was appointed an OBE for services to broadcasting.

Before being placed in editorial charge of the launch of the online service, he was, for 20 years, a correspondent for BBC Television News covering major news stories at home and abroad. He was also, during the late-1980s, a main co-presenter on the BBC Six O'Clock News and the BBC Nine O'Clock News and an occasional presenter of all the other BBC News output on TV.

Mike started his career at the Corporation at "BBC Radio Humberside" in the early 1970s as a News Producer and very occasional rock music DJ, following some years learning the craft of journalism on newspapers. During the late 1970s and early 1980s he was the BBC's staff reporter and a presenter of BBC North's (Leeds) regional TV news programme, Look North.

Smartt, who spent more than 30 years at the BBC, was succeeded by Pete Clifton at News Interactive. He now consults, lectures and writes about journalism and interactive news and is also editor-in-chief of World Press Photos Online magazine Enter.
