= Jenny Levine (librarian) =

American librarian

- Education: University of Illinois Urbana-Champaign (MLIS)
- Occupations: Librarian, digital strategist
- Known for: The Shifted Librarian, RSS

Jenny Levine is an American librarian and digital strategist who has been a longtime evangelist for the adoption of emerging Internet technologies by public libraries, in particular blogging and RSS. Since 2006, she has been a member of the RSS Advisory Board, a group that publishes the RSS specification and helps developers with web syndication. For over a decade, she has used her Shifted Librarian blog to encourage librarians to start blogs so they can "create an authentic voice for what has traditionally been a faceless, inhuman institution." One of the first librarians to publish a web site, which she began doing in 1995, her blog became so popular that she was once the top search result on Google for the term "Jenny."

Levine works as an internet strategist for the American Library Association (ALA) and has been with the association since 2006. She spearheaded the creation of the ALA's Games and Gaming Round Table, a committee devoted to exploring how computer games and game design can be incorporated into libraries.

Before working for the ALA, she was the internet development specialist and strategist for the Chicago Suburban Library System, now part of the Reaching Across Illinois Library System. She was hired as the technology coordinator for Grande Prairie Public Library District in 1996. In 2003, she was named one of the library industry's "Movers and Shakers" of the year by Library Journal. The publication called her an "information technology evangelist" and observed, "Whenever she sees new gadgets -- Bluetooth-equipped pens, or digital wi-fi cameras, or software that shows you how a web page displays on different kinds of platforms -- Levine immediately sees ways librarians can use them. ... She's made people outside our profession realize that librarians are cool."

After graduating with a Master of Library and Information Science in 1992 from the University of Illinois, Urbana-Champaign and taking a job as a reference librarian, Levine fell into her role as an Internet evangelist by chance. She said in an interview, "One day a patron asked for a recipe for Irish Soda Bread, and I couldn't find it in our collection. So I decided to try the CompuServe account I had just found out we had (that no one ever used) to fill the patron's need. Sure enough, there was a recipe I was able to print out for her. She was happy, and I was hooked."

== "Shifted Librarian" concept ==
On the Shifted Librarian blog she has published since January 2002, Levine has developed the idea that a "shifted librarian" model must be adopted in libraries to respond to how young people receive information.

She explained, "To my mind, the biggest difference is that they expect information to come to them, whether it's via the Web, email, cell phone, online chat, whatever. And given the tip of the iceberg of technology we're seeing, it's going to have a big impact on how they expect to receive library services, which means librarians have to start adjusting now. I call that adjustment 'shifting' because I think you have to start meeting these kids' information needs in their world, not yours. The library has to become more portable or 'shifted.'"

In her book I Found It On the Internet, the school librarian and author Frances Jacobsen Harris quoted this explanation, calling the model a "much-needed response to fundamental changes in young people's information needs and expectations."

The authors Helene Blowers and Robin Bryan in their book Weaving a Library Web: A Guide to Developing Children's Websites write that Levine has identified "one of the greatest challenges" that libraries face as children born in the information-rich world of the Web come of age. They write, "[I]t is not surprising to learn that children prefer the Internet over any other medium when it comes to receiving information. ... This is clear shift in preference since the heyday of TV."

Levine has published the Shifted Librarian blog since January 2002. Before that, she published the Librarian's Site du Jour website beginning in November 1995 "to convince librarians that the Web was extraordinarily useful for everyday reference."

== Personal life ==
Levine is a resident of Downers Grove, Illinois and spent part of her childhood in Greece, where her father was a Fulbright scholar, and Portugal. She wrote on her Facebook page that she suffered a paralyzed vocal cord in 1990, an ailment that makes her "very demanding about requiring a microphone" during her public speeches and presentations.

== Publications ==
- Gaming and Libraries Update: Broadening the Intersections (2008) ISBN 0-838-95793-5
- Gaming & Libraries: Learning Lessons from the Intersections (2006) ISBN 0-838-95803-6
- Gaming and Libraries: Intersection of Services (2006) ISBN 0-838-95783-8
- Library Mashups: Exploring New Ways to Deliver Library Data, edited by Nicole Engard with a foreword by Levine (2009) ISBN 1-573-87372-1
