= Controlled reception pattern antenna =

Active antennas that are designed to resist radio jamming

Controlled reception pattern antennas (CRPA) are active antennas that are designed to resist radio jamming and spoofing. They are used in navigation applications to resist GPS spoofing attacks.

== Background ==
CRPAs are active antenna arrays composed of multiple antenna elements, typically arranged in a compact configuration. Unlike traditional omnidirectional antennas, which receive signals equally from all directions, CRPAs use sophisticated signal processing techniques to create a directional reception pattern. This allows the antenna to focus on legitimate signals (e.g., GPS satellite signals) while nullifying or attenuating interfering or malicious signals, such as those from jammers or spoofers.

The primary function of a CRPA is to mitigate various types of threats:

- GPS jamming: Deliberate transmission of high-power radio signals to disrupt or block GPS signals.
- Spoofing: Transmission of counterfeit GPS signals to deceive a receiver into calculating an incorrect position or time.
- Obscuration: Blockage of GNSS signals, which operate on a line-of-sight principle, by physical obstructions such as tall buildings, slopes, dense foliage, tunnels, or underground structures. Obscuration can prevent signal reception entirely and may expose a receiver to spoofing attacks when it re-emerges from an obscured area and attempts to reacquire signals.
- Multipath: Reception of GNSS signals that are reflected or diffracted by nearby objects, such as buildings or terrain, causing delayed signals to arrive at the receiver. These multipath signals can lead to inaccurate distance measurements and erroneous position calculations.

CRPAs achieve this by using adaptive beamforming and null steering, which dynamically adjust the antenna's sensitivity to prioritize desired signals and suppress unwanted ones.

== Design, operation ==
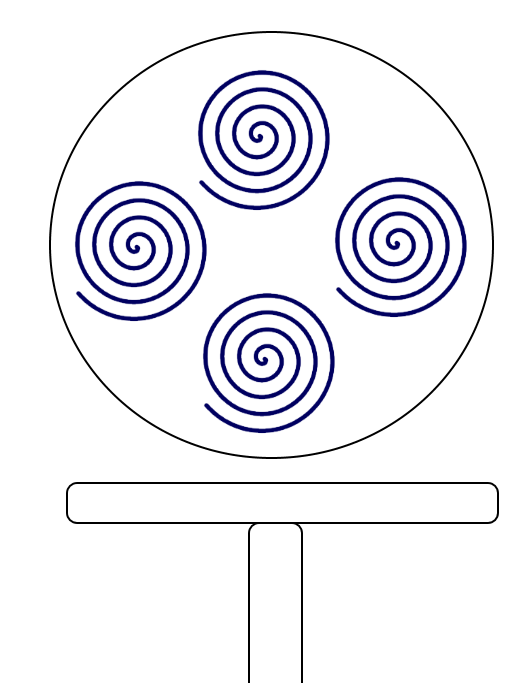
The interference-protected CRPA antenna on the Russian Armata vehicles. Inside the antenna "hat" is an array of spiral-shaped antennas that see only the signal from circularly polarized satellites

CRPA consists of the following components:

- Antenna array: A set of multiple antenna elements (typically 4 to 7) arranged in a specific geometric pattern, such as a circular or planar array. Each element receives signals independently.
- Signal processing unit: A digital processor that analyzes the signals received by each antenna element and applies algorithms to control the reception pattern.
- Receiver integration: The CRPA interfaces with a GPS or GNSS (global navigation satellite system) receiver to provide processed signals for navigation.

The operation of a CRPA relies on adaptive signal processing techniques, including:

- Beamforming: The antenna array combines signals from multiple elements to create a directional reception pattern that enhances the gain toward legitimate GPS satellites.
- Null steering: The system identifies the direction of interfering signals (e.g., jammers) and creates "nulls" in the reception pattern to minimize their impact.
- Spatial filtering: By exploiting the spatial separation between desired and undesired signals, the CRPA can differentiate between legitimate satellite signals and malicious transmissions.

Modern CRPAs use advanced algorithms, such as space-time adaptive processing (STAP) or space-frequency adaptive processing (SFAP), to adapt to complex and dynamic interference environment. These algorithms enable the antenna to respond in real time to changing signal conditions.
