= Referer spoofing =

Practice in HTTP networking of intentionally sending incorrect referer information

In HTTP networking, typically on the World Wide Web, referer spoofing (based on a canonized misspelling of referrer) sends incorrect referer information in an HTTP request in order to prevent a website from obtaining accurate data on the identity of the web page previously visited by the user.

== Overview ==
Referer spoofing is typically done for data privacy reasons, in testing, or in order to request information (without genuine authority) which some web servers may only supply in response to requests with specific HTTP referers.

To improve their privacy, individual browser users may replace accurate referer data with inaccurate data, though many simply suppress their browser's sending of any referer data. Sending no referrer information is not technically spoofing, though sometimes also described as such.

In software, systems and networks testing, and sometimes penetration testing, referer spoofing is often just part of a larger procedure of transmitting both accurate and inaccurate as well as expected and unexpected input to the HTTPD system being tested and observing the results.

While many websites are configured to gather referer information and serve different content depending on the referer information obtained, exclusively relying on HTTP referer information for authentication and authorization purposes is not a genuine computer security measure. HTTP referer information is freely alterable and interceptable, and is not a password, though some poorly configured systems treat it as such.

== Application ==
Some websites, especially many image hosting sites, use referer information to secure their materials: only browsers arriving from their web pages are served images. Additionally a site may want users to click through pages with advertisements before directly being able to access a downloadable file – using the referring page or referring site information can help a site redirect unauthorized users to the landing page the site would like to use.

If attackers acquire knowledge of these approved referrers, which is often trivial because many sites follow a common template, they can use that information combined with this to exploit and gain access to the materials.

Spoofing often allows access to a site's content where the site's web server is configured to block browsers that do not send referer headers. Website owners may do this to disallow hotlinking.

It can also be used to defeat referer checking controls that are used to mitigate cross-site request forgery attacks.

== Tools ==
Several software tools exist to facilitate referer spoofing in web browsers. Some are extensions to popular browsers such as Mozilla Firefox or Internet Explorer, which may provide facilities to customize and manage referrer URLs for each website the user visits.

Other tools include proxy servers, to which an individual configures their browser to send all HTTP requests. The proxy then forwards different headers to the intended website, usually removing or modifying the referer header. Such proxies may also present privacy issues for users, as they may log the user's activity.

== See also ==
- Referrer spam, a type of spam aimed at search engines
