= Flogger =

Flogger may refer to:

- Mikoyan-Gurevich MiG-23 "Flogger", a Russian fighter aircraft
- Mikoyan MiG-27 "Flogger-D/J", a Russian ground-attack aircraft
- Flogger (fashion), a teenage fashion originated in Argentina
- Someone who administers a flogging, or the device used for that purpose
- In the context of BDSM, a multi-tailed scourge typically made of soft leather

== See also ==
- Flog (disambiguation)
