= Pete Clifton =

British journalist

Pete Clifton was editor-in-chief at the Press Association (PA) until 2025. Prior to the appointment he was executive producer for MSN in the UK and former head of editorial development at BBC News.

== Career ==
Clifton was previously the editor of Ceefax, and before joining the BBC was a news and sports reporter at the Chronicle and Echo in Northampton, a sports journalist at the Exchange Telegraph national news agency, chief sports sub at the UK's Press Association (PA) and editor of the PA's Teletext service.

Clifton was involved in the founding of BBC News Online and also helped set up the BBC Sport website in 2000. He went on to become editor of BBC News Online in 2004, succeeding founding editor Mike Smartt, until he was promoted to head of BBC News Interactive in October 2005 with responsibility for BBC News Online, CBBC Newsround, the Ceefax teletext service, the digital text service, On This Day, BBC's Interactive TV, the Action Network and a variety of news services to mobile phones and other mobile devices.

Clifton replaced Richard Deverell as head of BBC News Interactive, who had moved to become chief operating officer of CBBC. Clifton's successor as editor of BBC News Online was Steve Herrmann.

Clifton admitted on the BBC Editor' Blog on 16 August 2007 that he had edited his own Wikipedia entry after viewing an incorrect entry for BBC News Online, but would be leaving the editing of the page to others in future.

In March 2011, the BBC announced Clifton would be made redundant following the closure of the BBC Journalism group within the organisation. The following month it was announced that he would be moving to MSN UK to become executive producer.

In January 2015, he was appointed editor-in-chief of the Press Association.
