= Google Hacks =

Book by Rael Dornfest

Google Hacks: Tips & Tools for Smarter Searching
- Author: Tara Calishain; Rael Dornfest
- Language: English
- Publisher: O'Reilly
- Publication date: 2002
- Publication place: United Kingdom
- Media type: Print
- ISBN: 0596004478

Google Hacks: Tips & Tools for Smarter Searching is a book of tips about Google by Tara Calishain and Rael Dornfest. It was listed in the New York Times top ten business paperbacks in May 2003, which was considered at the time to be "unprecedented" for a technology book, and "even rarer" for the topic of search engines. The book was first published by O'Reilly in February 2002, with a second edition coming in December 2004 (ISBN 0-596-00857-0) and a third edition in August 2006 (ISBN 0-596-52706-3).

It covers tips of all kinds, from usage hints for the novice just using Google, to advice for the expert programming with the Google Web API. Much of the content provided in the book can also be used for Google Hacking, the act of finding security issues through Google searches. Most programming examples are written in Perl.
