= Flog =

Flog may refer to:

- Fake blog, an astroturfing technique
- Flagellation or flogging, beating the human body with special implements such as whips
- The Flog, a video blog by Felicia Day
- Food blog, a blog dedicated to food; see Glossary of blogging

== See also ==
- Flogger (disambiguation)
