= RSS-DEV Working Group =

The RSS-DEV Working Group was the outgrowth of a fork in RSS format development. The private, non-commercial working group began with a dozen members in three countries, and was chaired by Rael Dornfest, researcher and developer of the Meerkat RSS-reader software.

== History ==
RSS-0.90 was released by Netscape circa March 1999, at which point the acronym implied RDF Site Summary. The functionality was remarkably different from what is now known as RSS, or Really Simple Syndication. The former simply provided a website summary, while the latter was designed for syndication. July 1999 saw the release of RSS-0.91, an improvement on its predecessor; the latter was XML-based, as opposed to the use of RDF (or Resource Description Framework) by the earlier version, which was then deprecated by Netscape. The new version also provided support for DTD, allowing for additional HTML-like functionality.

== Development fork ==
UserLand Software released its own RSS-0.91, circa June 2000. Unlike the Netscape version, this variant had no support for DTD. A team of developers, which would become members of the core development team of the RSS-DEV Working Group, broke away from the project. This group released its own set of specifications called RSS-1.0, on December 6, 2000.

RSS-1.0 marked a return to the use of the Netscape-deprecated RSS-0.90; the group also created its own interpretation of the RSS acronym — RDF Site Summary. This version, which was developed in parallel to the UserLand version, was incompatible with all other versions.

== Members ==
- Gabe Beged-Dov, JFinity Systems LLC
- Dan Brickley, ILRT
- Rael Dornfest, O'Reilly & Associates
- Ian Davis, Calaba, Ltd.
- Leigh Dodds, xmlhack
- Jonathan Eisenzopf, Whirlwind Interactive
- David Galbraith, Moreover.com
- R.V. Guha, guha.com
- Ken MacLeod, (Independent)
- Eric Miller, Online Computer Library Center, Inc.
- Aaron Swartz, The Info Network
- Eric van der Vlist, Dyomedea
