= Web syndication =

Broadcasting content from one website to other sites

Web syndication is making content available from one website to other sites. Most commonly, websites are made available to provide either summaries or full renditions of a website's recently added content. The term may also describe other kinds of content licensing for reuse.

Contemporary web syndicates include: MSN, Excite, and Yahoo! News.

== Motivation ==
For the subscribing sites, syndication is an effective way of adding greater depth and immediacy of information to their pages, making them more attractive to users. For the provider site, syndication increases exposure. This generates new traffic for the provider site—making syndication an easy and relatively cheap, or even free, form of advertisement.

Content syndication has become an effective strategy for link building, as search engine optimization has become an increasingly important topic among website owners and online marketers. Links embedded within the syndicated content are typically optimized around anchor terms that will point an optimized link back to the website that the content author is trying to promote. These links tell the algorithms of the search engines that the website being linked to is an authority for the keyword that is being used as the anchor text. However the rollout of Google Panda's algorithm may not reflect this authority in its SERP rankings based on quality scores generated by the sites linking to the authority.

The prevalence of web syndication is also of note to online marketers, since web surfers are becoming increasingly wary of providing personal information for marketing materials (such as signing up for a newsletter) and expect the ability to subscribe to a feed instead. Although the format could be anything transported over HTTP, such as HTML or JavaScript, it is more commonly XML. Web syndication formats include RSS, Atom, and JSON Feed.

== History ==
Syndication first arose in earlier media such as print, radio, and television, allowing content creators to reach a wider audience. In the case of radio, the United States Federal government proposed a syndicate in 1924 so that the country's executives could quickly and efficiently reach the entire population. In the case of television, it is often said that "Syndication is where the real money is." Additionally, syndication accounts for the bulk of TV programming.

One predecessor of web syndication is the Meta Content Framework (MCF), developed in 1996 by Ramanathan V. Guha and others in Apple Computer's Advanced Technology Group.

Today, millions of online publishers, including newspapers, commercial websites, and blogs, distribute their news headlines, product offers, and blog postings in the news feed.

== As a commercial model ==
Conventional syndication businesses such as Reuters and Associated Press thrive on the internet by offering their content to media partners on a subscription basis, using business models established in earlier media forms.

Commercial web syndication can be categorized in three ways:

- by business models
- by types of content
- by methods for selecting distribution partners

Commercial web syndication involves partnerships between content producers and distribution outlets. There are different structures of partnership agreements. One such structure is licensing content, in which distribution partners pay a fee to the content creators for the right to publish the content. Another structure is ad-supported content, in which publishers share revenues derived from advertising on syndicated content with that content's producer. A third structure is free, or barter syndication, in which no currency changes hands between publishers and content producers. This requires the content producers to generate revenue from another source, such as embedded advertising or subscriptions. Alternatively, they could distribute content without remuneration. Typically, those who create and distribute content free are promotional entities, vanity publishers, or government entities.

Types of content syndicated include RSS or Atom Feeds and full content. With RSS feeds, headlines, summaries, and sometimes a modified version of the original full content is displayed on users' feed readers. With full content, the entire content—which might be text, audio, video, applications/widgets, or user-generated content—appears unaltered on the publisher's site.

There are two methods for selecting distribution partners. The content creator can hand-pick syndication partners based on specific criteria, such as the size or quality of their audiences. Alternatively, the content creator can allow publisher sites or users to opt into carrying the content through an automated system. Some of these automated "content marketplace" systems involve careful screening of potential publishers by the content creator to ensure that the material does not end up in an inappropriate environment.

Just as syndication is a source of profit for TV producers and radio producers, it also functions to maximize profit for Internet content producers. As the Internet has increased in size it has become increasingly difficult for content producers to aggregate a sufficiently large audience to support the creation of high-quality content. Syndication enables content creators to amortize the cost of producing content by licensing it across multiple publishers or by maximizing the distribution of advertising-supported content. A potential drawback for content creators, however, is that they can lose control over the presentation of their content when they syndicate it to other parties.

Distribution partners benefit by receiving content either at a discounted price, or free. One potential drawback for publishers, however, is that because the content is duplicated at other publisher sites, they cannot have an "exclusive" on the content.

For users, the fact that syndication enables the production and maintenance of content allows them to find and consume content on the Internet. One potential drawback for them is that they may run into duplicate content, which could be an annoyance.

== E-commerce ==
Web syndication has been used to distribute product content such as feature descriptions, images, and specifications. As manufacturers are regarded as authorities and most sales are not achieved on manufacturer websites, manufacturers allow retailers or dealers to publish the information on their sites. Through syndication, manufacturers may pass relevant information to channel partners. Such web syndication has been shown to increase sales.

Web syndication has also been found effective as a search engine optimization technique.

== See also ==
- RSS
- Atom (web standard)
- Broadcast syndication
- Content delivery platform
- Feed icon
- hAtom
- List of comic strip syndicates
- List of streaming media systems
- Print syndication
- Protection of Broadcasts and Broadcasting Organizations Treaty
- Push technology
- Software as a service
- Usenet
