= RSS Advisory Board =

Standards organization

The RSS Advisory Board is a group founded in July 2003 that publishes the RSS 0.9, RSS 0.91 and RSS 2.0 specifications and helps developers create RSS applications.

Dave Winer, the lead author of several RSS specifications and a longtime evangelist of syndication, created the board to maintain the RSS 2.0 specification in cooperation with Harvard's Berkman Center.

In January 2006, RSS Advisory Board chairman Rogers Cadenhead announced that eight new members had joined the group, continuing the development of the RSS format and resolving ambiguities in the RSS 2.0 specification. Netscape developer Christopher Finke joined the board in March 2007, the company's first involvement in RSS since the publication of RSS 0.91.

In June 2007, the board revised its version of the specification to confirm that namespaces may extend core elements with namespace attributes, as Microsoft has done in Internet Explorer 7. In its view, a difference of interpretation left publishers unsure of whether this was permitted or forbidden.

In January 2008, Netscape announced that the RSS 0.9 and RSS 0.91 specifications, document type definitions and related documentation that it had published since their creation in 1999 were moving to the board.

Yahoo transferred the Media RSS specification to the board in December 2009.

== Current members ==
- Rogers Cadenhead
- Sterling Camden
- Simone Carletti
- James Holderness
- Jenny Levine
- Eric Lunt
- Randy Charles Morin
- Ryan Parman
- Paul Querna
- Jake Savin
- Jason Shellen
