= GNSS jamming =

Radio jamming of satellite navigation signals

GNSS jamming, including GPS jamming, is an act of communications interference to overwhelm global navigation satellite system (GNSS) receivers with powerful radio signals that drown out the navigation signals from GPS, GLONASS, BeiDou, or Galileo satellite constellations. It renders the receiver unable to calculate its position or time accurately. A common tactic of modern warfare, such jamming can disrupt various GNSS-dependent devices, from vehicle and aircraft navigation systems to precision agriculture and mobile phone networks. In civil aviation, GPS jamming can disrupt ADS-B transmission.

Under ITU rules, countries are obliged to eliminate harmful interference from GPS jamming and GPS spoofing, but the ITU lacks effective enforcement measures. The ICAO legal framework requires that countries should implement appropriate prevention and mitigation of GPS jamming and spoofing. Under the ICAO's Montreal Convention, countries shall make GPS jamming and spoofing punishable. In the United States, the operation, marketing, or sale of any GPS jamming equipment is prohibited under federal law.

== Occurrences ==
GPS jamming may be used by countries when conducting military exercises and drills, but under IATA recommendations they should recognize the harmful impact of such jamming to civil aviation and exercise utmost caution. In civil aviation, Eurocontrol outlined two major hotspots of GPS jamming: first, from Eastern Turkish airspace to Iraq, Iran, Armenia (extending to the Armenia–Azerbaijan border); second, from Southern Cypriot airspace towards Egypt, Lebanon and Israel.

Following Russian invasion of Ukraine, Russia used GPS jamming to support its military activity and in an effort to harass NATO nations. In December 2022 and January 2023, GPS jamming was noted in northern Poland, southern Sweden, southeastern Finland, Estonia, Lithuania and Latvia. In April 2023, Russia, to counter Ukrainian drone attacks, deployed GPS jamming in 15 of its regions, including Ivanovo, Vladimir, Yaroslavl, Ryazan, Kaluga and Tver Oblast that surround Moscow.

In 2024, an RAF plane carrying then-British Defence Secretary Grant Shapps had its GPS signal jammed while flying close to Russian airspace.

In April 2026, reports emerged that Ukrainian F-16 pilots undergoing training in the United Kingdom were being trained to operate in GPS-denied environments. According to Royal Air Force instructors involved in the program, pilots were trained in low-altitude and terrain-based orientation methods intended to compensate for degraded satellite navigation systems.

During the 2026 Iran war, GPS jamming of uncertain origin caused distortion of the locations of ships near the Strait of Hormuz, with many ships appearing to be on land. This may lead to disastrous accidents, especially for oil tankers.

In May 2026, a light aircraft on a medical evacuation mission in New Mexico crashed in the Capitan Mountains during GPS interference testing conducted at the nearby White Sands Missile Range. A preliminary investigation report by the U.S. National Transportation Safety Board indicates the agency is investigating the role GPS jamming might have played in the crash, which killed all four people on board. In the same month an RAF jet carrying then-British defence secretary John Healey had its GPS signal jammed near the Russian border after visiting British soldiers in Estonia.

== Countering ==
GPS jamming is seen as not as insidious as GPS spoofing, which is more difficult to detect. Jamming has been encountered on long-haul flights (particularly to Russia) in the form of flickering readings. Airline pilots are able to work around it using other navigation methods, following various checklists.

Most GNSS services operate on multiple frequency bands, such as GPS's L1, L2 and L5. If a jammer only operates on one or two of these bands, a multi-band receiver can use the GNSS service without issue using the unjammed band(s).

A horizon-blocking antenna can be used to only receive GNSS signals from overhead (greater than 20–30° elevation), reducing the amount of ground-based jamming signal received. More sophisticated controlled reception pattern antennas can adaptively reshape their receptive fields, allowing them to focus their reception on or "tune out" certain directions. Narrowband jammers can be defeated using digital filtering.

== See also ==
- Electronic warfare
- Radio jamming
