= Lloyd's List Intelligence =

Maritime data and intelligence company

Lloyd's List Intelligence (formerly Lloyd's MIU LLC) is a maritime data and intelligence company founded in 1734 as part of the wider Lloyd's List publishing operations. The company provides data and information services to the global shipping and trade finance industry, including vessel tracking, vessel risk analysis, market data, and counterparty risk assessments.

== Overview ==
Lloyd's List Intelligence operates an online platform offering vessel movement records, real-time AIS (Automatic Identification System) data, and information on ships, companies, ports, and maritime incidents. It also provides consultancy, investigations, due diligence, market analysis, and credit reporting services.

The company maintains offices in the United Kingdom, United States, Singapore, Japan, China, UAE, and India, with additional analysts and researchers based in Greece, India, Canada, and China.

== History ==
Lloyd's List Intelligence originated as a spin-off of Lloyd's List, one of the world's oldest continuously published journals focused on maritime news and data.

In 2017, the company launched its updated platform, "Next Gen Lloyd's List Intelligence".

In August 2022, parent company Informa, sold Lloyd's List Intelligence to Montagu Private Equity for £385 million.

In January 2025, Lloyd's List intelligence acquired counterparty-risk intelligence provider Infospectrum.

In April 2025, Lloyd's List Intelligence launched its own proprietary AIS data, AIS SeaOrbis, combining terrestrial, shipborne and satellite AIS data.

In February 2026, Lloyd's List Intelligence (LLI) announced that the Lloyd's Agency Network, an extensive marine surveying and claims adjusting network, was transferring from Lloyd's into the LLI ecosystem in April 2026.

== Services ==
The company provides subscription-based services covering sectors such as tankers, gas, dry bulk, finance and credit, law and regulation, and insurance, as well as providing its data to maritime software providers. These services include access to its Seasearcher, its global vessel movement and maritime activity platform, as well as analysts, data feeds and research tools.

Other services include risk assessment, asset tracking and the provision of maritime counterparty risk reports. Reports can be obtained individually or accessed through the company’s database.

== Data Sources ==
Lloyd's List Intelligence employs journalists, researchers and data analysts to collect and verify information. Its datasets combine terrestrial and shipborne AIS receivers, satellite AIS providers, classification societies, shipping registries, P&I clubs and port authorities.

As of 2021, more than 1,450 land-based AIS stations provided coverage across 132 countries, supplemented by satellite AIS through agreements with providers such as Orbcomm.

== See also ==
- Lloyd's List
- Informa
- Montagu Private Equity
- Lloyd's List Intelligence
- Lloyd's Agency Network
- Infospectrum
