= Spam blog =

Blog to increase search rankings

A spam blog, also known as an auto blog or the neologism splog, is a blog which the author uses to promote affiliated websites, to increase the search engine rankings of associated sites or to simply sell links/ads.

The purpose of a splog can be to increase the PageRank or backlink portfolio of affiliate websites, to artificially inflate paid ad impressions from visitors (see made for AdSense or MFA-blogs), and/or use the blog as a link outlet to sell links or get new sites indexed. Spam blogs are usually a type of scraper site, where content is often either inauthentic text or merely stolen (see blog scraping) from other websites. These blogs usually contain a high number of links to sites associated with the splog creator which are often disreputable or otherwise useless websites.

This is used often in conjunction with other spamming techniques, including spings.

== History ==
The term splog was popularized around mid August 2005 when it was used publicly by Mark Cuban, It developed from multiple linkblogs that were trying to influence search indexes and others trying to Google bomb every word in the dictionary.

== See also ==
- Adversarial information retrieval
- CAPTCHA
- Blog scraping
- Link farm
- Spam in blogs
- Spamdexing
