= Rogers Cadenhead =

American blogger (born 1967)

- Born: April 13, 1967 (age 59); Dallas, Texas, U.S.
- Education: University of North Texas
- Occupations: Writer, author
- Website: www.drudge.com

Rogers Cadenhead (born April 13, 1967) is an American computer book author and web publisher who served from 2006 to 2008 as chairman of the RSS Advisory Board, a group that publishes the RSS 2.0 specification. He graduated from Lloyd V. Berkner High School in Richardson, Texas in 1985 and the University of North Texas in 1991.

== Background ==
Cadenhead is the author of several editions of the Java in 21 Days and Java in 24 Hours series from SAMS Publishing and has written other books on Radio UserLand, Microsoft FrontPage and the Internet. From 1982 to 1986, Cadenhead operated the Parallax BBS in Dallas, Texas, which was possibly the first BBS to offer BBS door games.

He published the Internet humor site Cruel.com and is the copublisher of the community weblog SportsFilter. He has also been a contributor to Suck.com and previously authored a syndicated question-and-answer column for the Fort Worth Star-Telegram called "Ask Ed Brice."

== Drudge Retort ==
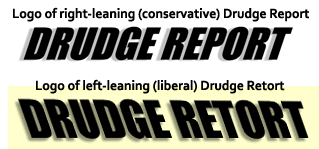
The competing logos of the formerly conservatively leaning Drudge Report and the liberal leaning parody website Drudge Retort

When news aggregator Matt Drudge failed to register drudge.com for his news website Drudge Report, Cadenhead registered drudge.com in 1998 and started the Drudge Retort as a liberal alternative to what he perceived to be the right-leaning Drudge Report, and as "a send-up of Mr. Drudge's breathless style". Cadenhead edits the site with television writer Jonathan Bourne. Both conservative and liberal bloggers utilize the open forum format, encouraged by Cadenhead. The headline selections for discussion are the liberal alternative to the Drudge Report.

Some readers may be confused between the two websites because the typography and page layouts are almost identical, and this is no coincidence since the site was deliberately designed to be like Drudge's website, using "the same style of type, the same rows of links to other journalists and columnists, the same screaming, sensational headlines trumpeting world exclusives". Cadenhead uses a yellow background, which implies that Drudge is a yellow journalist.

Even Matt Drudge visits the Drudge Retort, saying "I go there when I can't get into my own Web site because mine's so popular" in a 1999 interview with the New York Times.

After the Drudge Report changed its ownership and political leanings moved left in mid-to-late 2019, the Drudge Retort site has remained active and has retained its liberal leaning.

== In the news ==
In 2005, Cadenhead achieved brief notoriety for registering the domain name benedictxvi.com several weeks before the name was chosen by Pope Benedict XVI, joking that he would give it to the Vatican in exchange for a mitre and "complete absolution, no questions asked, for the third week of March 1987." Those demands not being met, he donated the domain to the Internet charity Modest Needs.

In December 2005, Cadenhead again achieved blog and media coverage by highlighting that Wikipedia co-founder Jimmy Wales had edited his own Wikipedia article repeatedly, which Wales admitted was "in poor taste."

In June 2008, the Associated Press filed seven DMCA takedown requests against Cadenhead for stories published by users on the Drudge Retort reproducing from 39 to 79 words of AP articles. The action sparked a backlash among bloggers towards the news organization and a debate about what constitutes fair use when bloggers link and excerpt articles. "If The A.P. has concerns that go all the way down to one or two sentences of quoting, they need to tell people what they think is legal and where the boundaries are," Cadenhead told the New York Times. The affair led AP to change its policy and install new technologies to protect its work.

== Bibliography ==
- Beginner's Guide to Minecraft Mods Programming, Second Edition (QUE, 2016) ISBN 0-7897-5574-2
- Sams Teach Yourself Java in 24 Hours, Seventh Edition (Sams Publishing, 2014) ISBN 0-672-33702-9
- Sams Teach Yourself Java in 21 Days, Sixth Edition (Sams Publishing, 2012) ISBN 978-0672335747
- Sams Teach Yourself C++ in 24 Hours (with Jesse Liberty) (Sams Publishing, 2011) ISBN 0-672-33331-7
- Sams Teach Yourself Java in 24 Hours, Sixth Edition (Sams Publishing, 2009) ISBN 0-672-33076-8
- Sams Teach Yourself Java in 24 Hours, Fifth Edition (Sams Publishing, 2009) ISBN 0-672-33076-8
- Sams Teach Yourself Java 6 in 21 Days (Sams Publishing, 2007) (with Laura Lemay) ISBN 0-672-32943-3
- Sams Teach Yourself Programming with Java in 24 Hours, Fourth Edition (Sams Publishing, 2004) ISBN 0-672-32844-5
- Movable Type 3 Bible Desktop Edition (Wiley Publishing, 2004) ISBN 0-764-57388-8
- Sams Teach Yourself Java 2 in 21 Days, Fourth Edition (with Laura Lemay) (Sams Publishing, 2004) ISBN 0-672-32628-0
- Sams Teach Yourself Microsoft FrontPage 2003 in 24 Hours (Sams Publishing, 2003) ISBN 0-672-32552-7
- Radio Userland Kick Start (Sams Publishing, 2003) ISBN 0-672-32563-2
- How to Use the Internet, Eighth Edition (Que Publishing, 2002) ISBN 0-789-72813-3
- Sams Teach Yourself Java 2 in 21 Days, Professional Reference Edition, Third Edition (with Laura Lemay) (Sams Publishing, 2002) ISBN 0-672-32455-5
- Sams Teach Yourself Java 2 in 24 Hours, Third Edition (Sams Publishing, 2002) ISBN 0-672-32460-1
- Sams Teach Yourself Java 2 in 21 Days, Third Edition (with Laura Lemay) (Sams Publishing, 2002) ISBN 0-672-32370-2
- How to Use the Internet, 2002 Edition (Que Publishing, 2001) ISBN 0-672-32215-3
- Sams Teach Yourself Java 2 in 21 Days, Professional Reference Edition, Second Edition (with Laura Lemay) (Sams Publishing, 2001) ISBN 0-672-32061-4
- How to Use the Internet, Fifth Edition (Que Publishing, 2000) ISBN 0-672-31747-8
- Sams Teach Yourself Java 2 in 24 Hours, Second Edition (Sams Publishing, 2000) ISBN 0-672-32036-3
- Sams Teach Yourself Java 2 in 21 Days, Second Edition (with Laura Lemay) (Sams Publishing, 2000) ISBN 0-672-31958-6
- How to Use the Internet, 2001 Edition (Que Publishing, 1999) ISBN 0-672-32000-2
- Sams Teach Yourself Microsoft FrontPage 2000 in 24 Hours (Sams Publishing, 1999) ISBN 0-672-31500-9
- Sams Teach Yourself Java 2 in 21 Days Professional Reference Edition (with Laura Lemay) (Sams Publishing, 1999) ISBN 1-575-21270-6
- Sams Teach Yourself Java 2 in 24 Hours (Sams Publishing, 1999) ISBN 0-672-31630-7
- Sams Teach Yourself Java 2 in 21 Days (with Laura Lemay) (Sams Publishing, 1999) ISBN 0-672-31638-2
- Sams Teach Yourself to Create Web Pages in 24 Hours (Sams Publishing, 1998) ISBN 0-672-31346-4
- Teach Yourself Java 1.1 Programming in 24 Hours (Sams Publishing, 1997) ISBN 1-575-21270-6
- Teach Yourself to Create a Home Page in 24 Hours (Sams Publishing, 1997) ISBN 1-575-21325-7
- Laura Lemay's Web Workshop Activex and Vbscript (with Neil Lomax) (Sams Publishing, 1996) ISBN 1-575-21207-2
- Teach Yourself SunSoft Java Workshop in 21 Days (with Laura Lemay and Charles Perkins) (Sams Publishing, 1996) ISBN 1-575-21159-9
