= Referrer spam =

Kind of spamming aimed at search engines

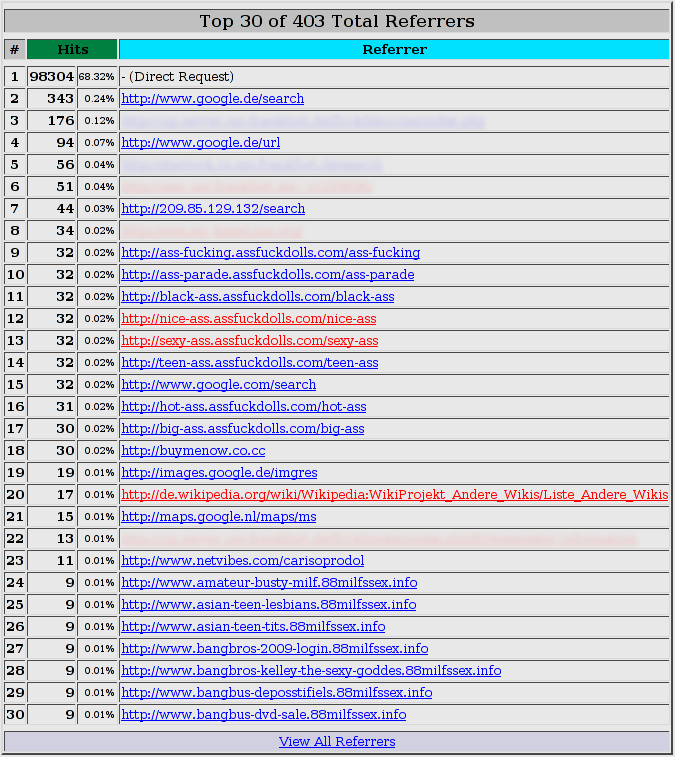
This is an excerpt of a screenshot of Referrer spam in the output of the Webalizer website analytics software.

Referrer spam (also known as referral spam, log spam or referrer bombing) is a kind of spamdexing (spamming aimed at search engines). The technique involves making repeated web site requests using a fake referrer URL to the site the spammer wishes to advertise. Sites that publish their access logs, including referrer statistics, will then inadvertently link back to the spammer's site. These links will be indexed by search engines as they crawl the access logs, improving the spammer's search engine ranking.

At least since 2014, a new variation of this form of spam occurs on Google Analytics. Spammers send fake visits to Google Analytics, often without ever accessing the affected site. The technique is used to have the spammers' URLs appear in the site statistics, inducing the site owner to visit the spam URLs. If the spammer has never visited the affected site, the fake visits are also called ghost spam.

== Mitigations ==
Techniques for mitigating referrer spam include blocking spam crawlers and filtering out known spam domains in analytics software. The open-source analytics company Matomo maintains a public domain crowdsourced list of spam-associated domains which it uses in automatic filters.

== See also ==
- Adversarial information retrieval – Information retrieval strategies in datasets
- Spam in blogs – Form of spamdexing
- Referer spoofing – Practice in HTTP networking of intentionally sending incorrect referer information
