= Trackback =

Type of linkback method for Web authors

A trackback is a linkback method used to notify a website when another site links to its content. It enables websites to display links and excerpts from referring posts, allowing discussions to span multiple websites.

== History ==
The TrackBack specification was created by Six Apart, which first implemented it in its Movable Type blogging software in August 2002. Released as an open specification, the protocol was subsequently adopted by various other content management systems. A revised specification (version 1.2) was published in 2004.

Some platforms used alternative systems instead of TrackBack; for example, Google's Blogger implemented a proprietary "backlinks" feature based on Google's search infrastructure.

== Mechanism ==
A trackback works by sending an XML-RPC ping from the originating site to the receiving site's TrackBack URL. When an article is published, the blogging software sends an HTTP POST request containing the source URL, the entry title, a short text excerpt, and the name of the blog.

Some platforms discover TrackBack URLs automatically through HTML metadata, while others require authors to enter them manually. The receiving platform may then display the reference alongside the original entry, allowing readers to follow conversations across separate websites.

== Spam ==
Because trackbacks publish user-submitted URLs without prior authentication, the system became a major target for link spam. Spammers used the protocol to post automated backlinks to improve their search engine optimization rankings. A 2009 Stanford University study analyzed a single campaign that generated nearly 10 million TrackBack spam pings in a year, demonstrating the vulnerability of the protocol. Anti-spam filters and automated detection methods were developed to stop this abuse, but the volume of spam made trackbacks too difficult to maintain. By the 2010s, most platforms disabled trackbacks by default or removed them entirely in favor of pingback or Webmention.

== See also ==
- Linkback
- Pingback
- Webmention
- Refback
- Referer
- Search engine optimization
- Sping
