= Jon Udell =

Udell

Jon Udell is a freelance journalist. From 2007 to 2014 he was "Evangelist" at Microsoft. Previously he was lead analyst for the InfoWorld Test Center.

Udell is author of Practical Internet Groupware, published in 1999 by O'Reilly Media, and is an advisor to O'Reilly's Safari Tech Books Online. He wrote the column "Tangled in the Threads" for Byte.com from 1999 to 2002, and continues to be an active blogger. In this context he published a screencast illustrating how Wikipedia articles evolve, using Heavy metal umlaut as an example. A major focus of much of his writing is the question of how to enable non-experts to find data (often on the internet) and utilize in new ways.

He created the LibraryLookup bookmarklet project, which makes it easier for people to discover if their local library has a copy of a given book. Jon is a graduate of both the University of Michigan and Johns Hopkins University.
