= Semantic HTML =

HTML used to reinforce meaning of documents or webpages

HTML element content categories

Semantic HTML is the use of HTML markup to reinforce the semantics, or meaning, of the information in web pages and web applications rather than merely to define its presentation or look. Semantic HTML is processed by conventional web browsers as well as by many other user agents. CSS is used to suggest how it is presented to human users.

== History ==
HTML has included semantic markup since its inception. In an HTML document, the author may, among other things, "start with a title; add headings and paragraphs; add emphasis to [the] text; add images; add links to other pages; [and] use various kinds of lists".

Various versions of the HTML standard have included presentational markup such as <font> (added in HTML 3.2; removed in HTML 4.0 Strict), <i> (all versions) and <center> (added in HTML 3.2). There are also the semantically neutral span and div elements. Since the late 1990s when Cascading Style Sheets were beginning to work in most browsers, web authors have been encouraged to avoid the use of presentational HTML markup with a view to the separation of content and presentation.

=== Prospects for autonomous agents and web crawlers ===
In 2001, Tim Berners-Lee participated in a discussion of the Semantic Web, where it was presented that intelligent software 'agents' might one day automatically crawl the Web and find, filter and correlate previously unrelated, published facts for the benefit of end users. Such agents are not commonplace even now, but some of the ideas of Web 2.0, such as mashups and price comparison websites approximate it, and developments in agentic AI have the potential to make progress in this area. The main difference between these web application hybrids and Berners-Lee's semantic agents lies in the fact that the current aggregation and hybridisation of information is usually designed in by web developers, who already know the web locations and the API semantics of the specific data they wish to mash, compare and combine.

An important type of web agent that does crawl and read web pages automatically, without prior knowledge of what it might find, is the web crawler or search-engine spider. These software agents are dependent on the semantic clarity of web pages they find as they use various techniques and algorithms to read and index millions of web pages a day and provide web users with search facilities.

In order for search-engine spiders to be able to rate the significance of pieces of text they find in HTML documents, and also for those creating mashups and other hybrids, as well as for more automated agents as they are developed, the semantic structures that exist in HTML need to be widely and uniformly applied to bring out the meaning of published information.

=== Overall semanticity of web architecture ===
While the true semantic web may depend on complex RDF ontologies and metadata, every HTML document makes its contribution to the meaningfulness of the Web by the correct use of headings, lists, titles and other semantic markup wherever possible. This "plain" use of HTML has been called "Plain Old Semantic HTML" or POSH. The correct use of Web 2.0 'tagging' creates folksonomies that may be equally or even more meaningful to many. HTML 5 introduced new semantic elements such as <section>, <article>, <footer>, <progress>, <nav>, <aside>, <mark>, and <time>. Overall, the goal of the W3C is to slowly introduce more ways for browsers, developers, and crawlers to better distinguish between different types of data, allowing for benefits such as better display on browsers on different devices.

Presentational elements were not formally deprecated in HTML 4.01 and XHTML recommendations, but were recommended against. In HTML 5, some of those elements, such as <i> and <b>, are still specified as their meaning has been clearly defined "as to be stylistically offset from the normal prose without conveying any extra importance".

== Considerations ==
In cases where a document requires more precise semantics than those expressed in HTML alone, fragments of the document may be enclosed within span or div elements with meaningful class names such as <span class="author"> and <div class="invoice">. Where these class names are also a fragment identifier within a schema or ontology, they may link to a more defined meaning. Microformats formalise this approach to semantics in HTML.

One important restriction of this approach is that such markup based on element inclusion must meet the well-formedness conditions. As these documents are broadly tree-structured, this means that only balanced fragments from a sub-tree can be marked up in this way. A means of marking-up any arbitrary section of HTML would require a mechanism independent of the markup structure itself, such as XPointer.

Good semantic HTML also improves the accessibility of web documents (see also Web Content Accessibility Guidelines). For example, when a screen reader or audio browser can correctly ascertain the structure of a document, it will not waste the visually impaired user's time by reading out repeated or irrelevant information when it has been marked up correctly.

== Google "rich snippets" ==
In 2010, Google specified three forms of structured metadata that their systems will use to find structured semantic content within webpages. Such information, when related to reviews, people profiles, business listings, and events will be used by Google to enhance the "snippet", or short piece of quoted text that is shown when the page appears in search listings. Google specifies that that data may be given using microdata, microformats or RDFa. Microdata is specified inside itemtype and itemprop attributes added to existing HTML elements; microformat keywords are added inside class attributes as discussed above; and RDFa relies on rel, typeof and property attributes added to existing elements.

== See also ==
- CP/LD (Content Profile/Linked Document)
- HTML elements (complete list)
- HTML landmarks
- Microdata (HTML)
- Microformat
- RDFa
- schema.org is an initiative launched on 2 June 2011 by Bing, Google and Yahoo!
- Semantic Web
- Semantics (computer science)
- XML
