= XMDP =

XHTML Meta Data Profiles (XMDP) is a format for defining metadata 'profiles' or formats in a machine-readable fashion, while also enabling people to see a description of the definition visually in a web browser. XMDP definitions are expressed in XHTML (or possibly HTML). Examples of applications that use XMDP include XFN and hCard.

== Example ==
<dl class="profile">
  <dt id="title">title</dt>
  <dd>The name given to a piece of work.</dd>
</dl>

To apply, use the profile attribute in the head element of your document:

<head profile="URL">

Where URL denotes the full address of your XMDP profile resource.

== See also ==
- microformats
- XHTML Friends Network
- hCard
- XHTML
