= ICalendar =

Computer file format for calendar information

- Filename extension: .ical, .ics, .ifb, .icalendar
- Internet media type: text/calendar
- Type of format: Calendar data exchange
- Standard: RFC 5545 (Updated by: RFC 5546, RFC 6868, RFC 7529, RFC 7986)
- Open format?: Yes

The Internet Calendaring and Scheduling Core Object Specification (iCalendar) is a media type which allows users to store and exchange calendaring and scheduling information such as events, to-dos, journal entries, and free/busy information. Together with its associated standards, iCalendar has been a cornerstone of the standardization and interoperability of digital calendars across different vendors. Files formatted according to the specification usually have an extension of .ics. With supporting software, such as an email reader or calendar application, recipients of an iCalendar data file can respond to the sender easily or counter-propose another meeting date/time. The file format is specified in a proposed Internet standard (RFC 5545) for calendar data exchange. The standard and file type are sometimes referred to as "iCal", which was the name of the Apple Inc. calendar program until 2012 (see iCal), which provides one of the implementations of the standard.

iCalendar is used and supported by many products, including:

- general consumer: Apple Calendar (formerly iCal), eM Client, Google Calendar, Yahoo! Calendar
- corporate: HCL Domino (formerly IBM Notes and Lotus Notes)
- free software: GNOME Evolution, GNU Emacs, Mozilla Thunderbird, and SeaMonkey

It is partially supported by Microsoft Outlook and Novell GroupWise.

iCalendar is designed to be independent of the transport protocol. For example, certain events can be sent by traditional email or whole calendar files can be shared and edited by using a WebDav server, or SyncML. Simple web servers (using just the HTTP protocol) are often used to distribute iCalendar data about an event and to publish busy times of an individual. Publishers can embed iCalendar data in web pages using hCalendar, a 1:1 microformat representation of iCalendar in semantic (X)HTML.

== History ==
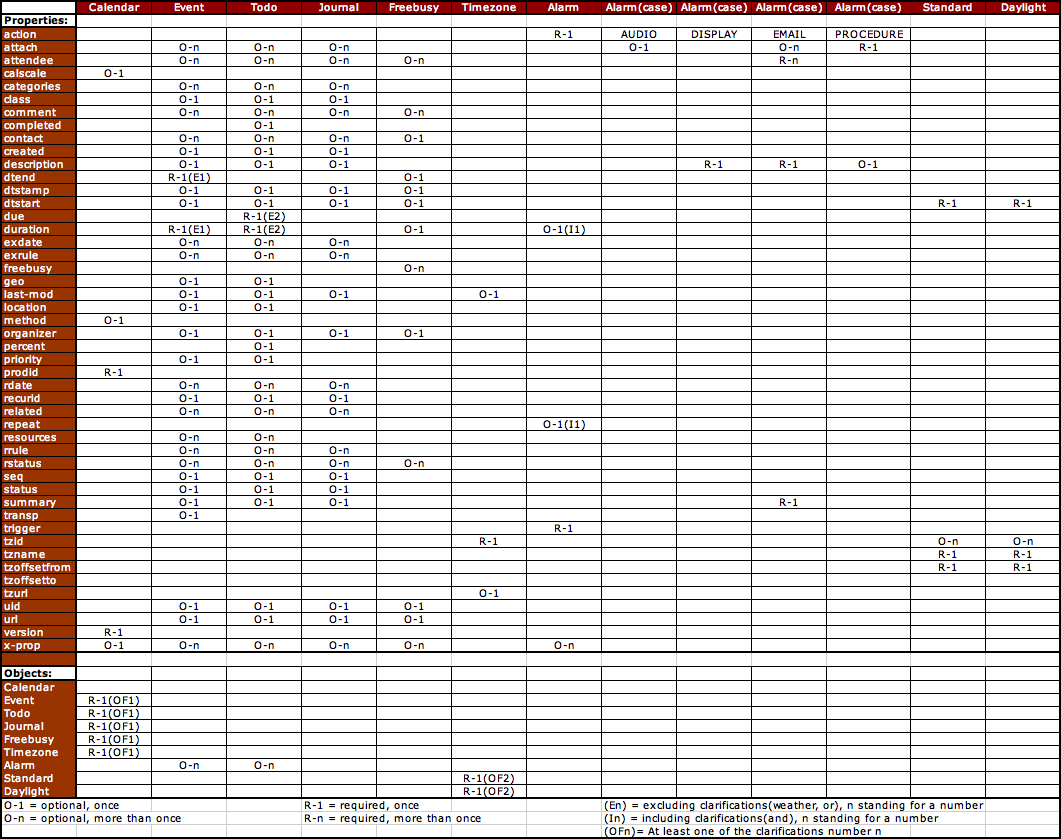
iCalendar components and their properties

iCalendar was created in 1998 by the Calendaring and Scheduling Working Group of the Internet Engineering Task Force, chaired by Anik Ganguly of Open Text Corporation, and was authored by Frank Dawson of Lotus Development Corporation and Derik Stenerson of Microsoft Corporation. iCalendar data files are plain text files with the extension .ics or .ifb (for files containing availability information only). RFC 5545 replaced RFC 2445 in September 2009 and now defines the standard.

iCalendar is heavily based on the earlier vCalendar by the Internet Mail Consortium (IMC) which has the .vcs file extension. After iCalendar was released, the Internet Mail Consortium stated that it "hopes that all vCalendar developers take advantage of these new open standards and make their software compatible with both vCalendar 1.0 and iCalendar."

The memo "Calendar Access Protocol" (RFC 4324) was an initial attempt at a universal system to create real-time calendars, but was eventually abandoned. Instead, iCalendar saw some adoption for such purposes with ad hoc extensions such as GroupDAV and CalDAV emerging as informal standards and seeing some adoption in both client and server software packages.

A first effort to simplify iCalendar standards by the IETF "Calendaring and Scheduling Working Group" (ietf-calsify WG) ended in January 2011 without seeing adoption. The work was then picked up by the "Calendaring Extensions Working Group" (ietf-calext WG).

== Design ==
iCalendar data have the MIME content type text/calendar. The filename extension of ics is to be used for files containing calendaring and scheduling information, ifb for files with free or busy time information consistent with this MIME content type. The equivalent file type codes in Apple Macintosh operating system environments are iCal and iFBf.

By default, iCalendar uses the UTF-8 character set; a different character set can be specified using the "charset" MIME parameter (if the transport method used supports MIME, such as Email or HTTP). Each line is terminated by CR+LF (in hexadecimal: 0D0A). Lines should be limited to 75 octets (not characters) long. Where a data item is too long to fit on a single line it can be continued on following lines by starting the continuation lines with a space character (in hex: 20) or a tab character (in hex: 09). Actual line feeds in data items are encoded as a backslash followed by the letter n or N (the bytes 5C 6E or 5C 4E in UTF-8).

The iCalendar format is designed to transmit calendar-based data, such as events, and intentionally does not describe what to do with that data. Thus, other programming may be needed to negotiate what to do with this data. A companion standard, "iCalendar Transport-Independent Interoperability" (iTIP) (RFC 2446), defines a protocol for exchanging iCalendar objects for collaborative calendaring and scheduling between "Calendar Users" (CUs) facilitated by an "Organizer" initiating the exchange of data. This standard defines methods such as PUBLISH, REQUEST, REPLY, ADD, CANCEL, REFRESH, COUNTER (to negotiate a change in the entry), and DECLINE-COUNTER (to decline the counter-proposal). Another companion standard, "iCalendar Message-based Interoperability Protocol (iMIP)" (RFC 2447), defines a standard method for implementing iTIP on standard Internet email-based transports. The "Guide to Internet Calendaring" (RFC 3283) explains how iCalendar interacts with other calendar computer language (current and future).

The top-level element in iCalendar is the Calendaring and Scheduling Core Object, a collection of calendar and scheduling information. Typically, this information will consist of a single iCalendar object. However, multiple iCalendar objects can be grouped together. The first line must be BEGIN:VCALENDAR, and the last line must be END:VCALENDAR; the contents between these lines is called the "icalbody". The body must include the "PRODID" and "VERSION" calendar properties. In addition, it must include at least one calendar component.

VERSION:1.0 is used to specify that data is in the old vCalendar format. VERSION is 2.0 for the current iCalendar format as of 2016.

The body of the iCalendar object (the icalbody) contains single-line Calendar Properties that apply to the entire calendar, as well as one or more blocks of multiple lines that each define a Calendar Component such as an event, journal entry, alarm, or one of several other types. Here is a simple example of an iCalendar object with a single calendar containing a single Calendar Component, a "Bastille Day Party" event starting at 5pm on July 14, 1997, and ending at 4am the following morning:

BEGIN:VCALENDAR
VERSION:2.0
PRODID:-//hacksw/handcal//NONSGML v1.0//EN
BEGIN:VEVENT
UID:uid1@example.com
ORGANIZER;CN=John Doe:MAILTO:john.doe@example.com
DTSTAMP:19970701T100000Z
DTSTART:19970714T170000Z
DTEND:19970715T040000Z
SUMMARY:Bastille Day Party
GEO:48.85299;2.36885
END:VEVENT
END:VCALENDAR

The UID field distributes updates when a scheduled event changes. When the event is first generated a globally unique identifier is created. If a later event is distributed with the same UID, it replaces the original one. An example UID might be Y2007S2C131M5@example.edu, for the 5th meeting of class 131 in semester 2 at a hypothetical college. Email-style UIDs are now considered bad practice, with a UUID recommended instead.

The most common representation of date and time is a tz timestamp based on ISO 8601 format, such as 20010911T124640Z, with the format [YYYY][MM][DD]T[hh][mm][ss]Z for a total fixed length of 16 characters. Z indicates the use of UTC (referring to its Zulu time zone). When used in DTSTART and DTEND properties, start times are inclusive while end times are not. This allows an event's end time to be the same as a consecutive event's start without those events overlapping and potentially creating (false) scheduling conflicts.

Components include:

- VEVENT describes an event, which has a scheduled amount of time on a calendar. Normally, when a user accepts the calendar event, this will cause that time to be considered busy, though an event can be set to be TRANSPARENT to change this interpretation. A VEVENT may include a VALARM which allows an alarm. Such events have a DTSTART which sets a starting time, and a DTEND which sets an ending time. If the calendar event is recurring, DTSTART sets up the start of the first event.
- VTODO explains a to-do item, i.e., an action-item or assignment. Not all calendar applications recognize VTODO items. In particular, Outlook does not export Tasks as VTODO items, and ignores VTODO items in imported calendars.
- VJOURNAL is a journal entry. They attach descriptive text to a particular calendar date, may be used to record a daily record of activities or accomplishments, or describe progress with a related to-do entry. A VJOURNAL calendar component does not take up time on a calendar, so it has no effect on free or busy time (just like TRANSPARENT entries). In practice, few programs support VJOURNAL entries.
- VFREEBUSY is a request for free/busy time, is a response to a request, or is a published set of busy time.
- Other component types include VAVAILABILITY, VTIMEZONE (time zones) and VALARM (alarms). Some components can include other components (VALARM is often included in other components). Some components are often defined to support other components defined after them (VTIMEZONE is often used this way).

iCalendar is meant to "provide the definition of a common format for openly exchanging calendaring and scheduling information across the Internet". While the features most often used by users are widely supported by iCalendar, some more advanced capabilities have problems. For example, most vendors do not support Journals (VJOURNAL). VTODOs have had conversion problems as well.

iCalendar's calendar is also not compatible with some non-Gregorian calendars such as the lunar calendars used in Israel and Saudi Arabia. Although there exist one-to-one mappings between Gregorian and many other calendar scales, the lack of defined CALSCALE values for those calendars and limitations in various date fields can make native support impossible. For example the Hebrew calendar year may contain either 12 or 13 months, and the Japanese Emperor-based calendar scale contains many eras.

== Extensions ==
vCalendar and iCalendar support private software extensions, with a "X-" prefix, a number of which are in common usage.

Some of these include:

- X-RECURRENCE-ID: vCalendar 1.0 extension which mimics the iCalendar 2.0 RECURRENCE-ID (Nokia S60 3rd Edition)
- X-EPOCAGENDAENTRYTYPE: defines the client calendar type
- X-FUNAMBOL-AALARMOPTIONS
- X-FUNAMBOL-ALLDAY: All Day event flag
- X-MICROSOFT-CDO-ALLDAYEVENT: Microsoft Outlook all day event flag
- X-MICROSOFT-CDO-BUSYSTATUS: Microsoft Outlook status information
- X-MICROSOFT-CDO-INTENDEDSTATUS
- X-WR-CALNAME: The display name of the calendar
- X-WR-CALDESC: A description of the calendar
- X-WR-RELCALID: A globally unique identifier for the calendar
- X-WR-TIMEZONE
- X-PUBLISHED-TTL: Recommended update interval for subscription to the calendar
- X-ALT-DESC: Used to include HTML markup in an event's description. Standard DESCRIPTION tag should contain non-HTML version.
- X-FMTTYPE, X-FILEDATE, X-NAME, X-CN, X-STATUS, X-ROLE, X-SENTBY, X-SYMBIAN-DTSTAMP, X-METHOD, X-RECURRENCE-ID, X-EPOCALARM, X-SYMBIAN-LUID, X-EPOCAGENDAENTRYTYPE

== List of components, properties, and parameters ==
Name	Kind	RFC section (RFC 5545 by default)	MS-OXCICAL section 2.1.3 subsections
VCALENDAR	Component	3.4. iCalendar Object	1.1
VEVENT	Component	3.6.1. Event Component	1.1.20
VTODO	Component	3.6.2. To-Do Component	
VJOURNAL	Component	3.6.3. Journal Component	
VFREEBUSY	Component	3.6.4. Free/Busy Component	
VTIMEZONE	Component	3.6.5. Time Zone Component	
STANDARD	Component	3.6.5. Time Zone Component	1.1.19.2
DAYLIGHT	Component	3.6.5. Time Zone Component	1.1.19.3
VALARM	Component	3.6.6. Alarm Component	
VAVAILABILITY	Component	RFC 7953 section 3.1. VAVAILABILITY Component	
AVAILABLE	Component	RFC 7953 section 3.1. VAVAILABILITY Component	
PARTICIPANT	Component	RFC 9073 section 7.1. Participant	
VLOCATION	Component	RFC 9073 section 7.2. Location	
VRESOURCE	Component	RFC 9073 section 7.3. Resource	
CALSCALE	Property	3.7.1. Calendar Scale	
METHOD	Property	3.7.2. Method	1.1.1
PRODID	Property	3.7.3. Product Identifier	1.1.2
VERSION	Property	3.7.4. Version	1.1.3
X-CALEND	Property		1.1.4
X-CALSTART	Property		1.1.5
X-CLIPEND	Property		1.1.6
X-CLIPSTART	Property		1.1.7
X-MICROSOFT-CALSCALE	Property		1.1.8
X-MS-OLK-FORCEINSPECTOROPEN	Property		1.1.9
X-MS-WKHRDAYS	Property		1.1.10
X-MS-WKHREND	Property		1.1.11
X-MS-WKHRSTART	Property		1.1.12
X-OWNER	Property		1.1.13
X-PRIMARY-CALENDAR	Property		1.1.14
X-PUBLISHED-TTL	Property		1.1.15
X-WR-CALDESC	Property		1.1.16
X-WR-CALNAME	Property		1.1.17
X-WR-RELCALID	Property		1.1.18
ATTACH	Property	3.8.1.1. Attachment	1.1.20.1
CATEGORIES	Property	3.8.1.2. Categories, RFC 7986 section 5.6. CATEGORIES Property	1.1.20.3
CLASS	Property	3.8.1.3. Classification	1.1.20.4
COMMENT	Property	3.8.1.4. Comment	1.1.20.5
DESCRIPTION	Property	3.8.1.5. Description, RFC 7986 section 5.2. DESCRIPTION Property	1.1.20.11, 1.1.20.62.3
GEO	Property	3.8.1.6. Geographic Position	
LOCATION	Property	3.8.1.7. Location	1.1.20.15
PERCENT-COMPLETE	Property	3.8.1.8. Percent Complete	
PRIORITY	Property	3.8.1.9. Priority	1.1.20.17
RESOURCES	Property	3.8.1.10. Resources	1.1.20.21
STATUS	Property	3.8.1.11. Status	1.1.20.23
SUMMARY	Property	3.8.1.12. Summary	1.1.20.24
COMPLETED	Property	3.8.2.1. Date-Time Completed	
DTEND	Property	3.8.2.2. Date-Time End	1.1.20.8
DUE	Property	3.8.2.3. Date-Time Due	
DTSTART	Property	3.8.2.4. Date-Time Start	1.1.19.2.1, 1.1.19.3.1, 1.1.20.10
DURATION	Property	3.8.2.5. Duration	1.1.20.12
FREEBUSY	Property	3.8.2.6. Free/Busy Time	
TRANSP	Property	3.8.2.7. Time Transparency	1.1.20.25
TZID	Property	3.8.3.1. Time Zone Identifier	1.1.19.1
TZNAME	Property	3.8.3.2. Time Zone Name	1.1.19.2.3, 1.1.19.3.3
TZOFFSETFROM	Property	3.8.3.3. Time Zone Offset From	1.1.19.2.4, 1.1.19.3.4
TZOFFSETTO	Property	3.8.3.4. Time Zone Offset To	1.1.19.2.5, 1.1.19.3.5
TZURL	Property	3.8.3.5. Time Zone URL	
ATTENDEE	Property	3.8.4.1. Attendee	1.1.20.2
CONTACT	Property	3.8.4.2. Contact	1.1.20.6
ORGANIZER	Property	3.8.4.3. Organizer	1.1.20.16
RECURRENCE-ID	Property	3.8.4.4. Recurrence ID	1.1.20.20
RELATED-TO	Property	3.8.4.5. Related To, RFC 9253 section 9.1. RELATED-TO	
URL	Property	3.8.4.6. Uniform Resource Locator, RFC 7986 section 5.5. URL Property	
UID	Property	3.8.4.7. Unique Identifier, RFC 7986 section 5.3. UID Property	1.1.20.26
EXDATE	Property	3.8.5.1. Exception Date-Times	1.1.20.13
RDATE	Property	3.8.5.2. Recurrence Date-Times	1.1.20.18
RRULE	Property	3.8.5.3. Recurrence Rule	1.1.19.2.2, 1.1.19.3.2, 1.1.20.19
ACTION	Property	3.8.6.1. Action	1.1.20.62.2
REPEAT	Property	3.8.6.2. Repeat Count	
TRIGGER	Property	3.8.6.3. Trigger	1.1.20.62.1
CREATED	Property	3.8.7.1. Date-Time Created	1.1.20.7
DTSTAMP	Property	3.8.7.2. Date-Time Stamp	1.1.20.9
LAST-MODIFIED	Property	3.8.7.3. Last Modified, RFC 7986 section 5.4. LAST-MODIFIED Property	1.1.20.14
SEQUENCE	Property	3.8.7.4. Sequence Number	1.1.20.22
REQUEST-STATUS	Property	3.8.8.3. Request Status	
X-ALT-DESC	Property		1.1.20.27
X-MICROSOFT-CDO-ALLDAYEVENT	Property		1.1.20.28
X-MICROSOFT-CDO-APPT-SEQUENCE	Property		1.1.20.29
X-MICROSOFT-CDO-ATTENDEE-CRITICAL-CHANGE	Property		1.1.20.30
X-MICROSOFT-CDO-BUSYSTATUS	Property		1.1.20.31
X-MICROSOFT-CDO-IMPORTANCE	Property		1.1.20.32
X-MICROSOFT-CDO-INSTTYPE	Property		1.1.20.33
X-MICROSOFT-CDO-INTENDEDSTATUS	Property		1.1.20.34
X-MICROSOFT-CDO-OWNERAPPTID	Property		1.1.20.35
X-MICROSOFT-CDO-OWNER-CRITICAL-CHANGE	Property		1.1.20.36
X-MICROSOFT-CDO-REPLYTIME	Property		1.1.20.37
X-MICROSOFT-DISALLOW-COUNTER	Property		1.1.20.38
X-MICROSOFT-EXDATE	Property		1.1.20.39
X-MICROSOFT-ISDRAFT	Property		1.1.20.40
X-MICROSOFT-MSNCALENDAR-ALLDAYEVENT	Property		1.1.20.41
X-MICROSOFT-MSNCALENDAR-BUSYSTATUS	Property		1.1.20.42
X-MICROSOFT-MSNCALENDAR-IMPORTANCE	Property		1.1.20.43
X-MICROSOFT-MSNCALENDAR-INTENDEDSTATUS	Property		1.1.20.44
X-MICROSOFT-RRULE	Property		1.1.20.45
X-MS-OLK-ALLOWEXTERNCHECK	Property		1.1.20.46
X-MS-OLK-APPTLASTSEQUENCE	Property		1.1.20.47
X-MS-OLK-APPTSEQTIME	Property		1.1.20.48
X-MS-OLK-AUTOFILLLOCATION	Property		1.1.20.49
X-MS-OLK-AUTOSTARTCHECK	Property		1.1.20.50
X-MS-OLK-COLLABORATEDOC	Property		1.1.20.51
X-MS-OLK-CONFCHECK	Property		1.1.20.52
X-MS-OLK-CONFTYPE	Property		1.1.20.53
X-MS-OLK-DIRECTORY	Property		1.1.20.54
X-MS-OLK-MWSURL	Property		1.1.20.55
X-MS-OLK-NETSHOWURL	Property		1.1.20.56
X-MS-OLK-ONLINEPASSWORD	Property		1.1.20.57
X-MS-OLK-ORGALIAS	Property		1.1.20.58
X-MS-OLK-SENDER	Property		1.1.20.61
BUSYTYPE	Property	RFC 7953 section 3.2. Busy Time Type	
NAME	Property	RFC 7986 section 5.1. NAME Property	
REFRESH-INTERVAL	Property	RFC 7986 section 5.7. REFRESH-INTERVAL Property	
SOURCE	Property	RFC 7986 section 5.8. SOURCE Property	
COLOR	Property	RFC 7986 section 5.9. COLOR Property	
IMAGE	Property	RFC 7986 section 5.10. IMAGE Property	
CONFERENCE	Property	RFC 7986 section 5.11. CONFERENCE Property	
CALENDAR-ADDRESS	Property	RFC 9073 section 6.4. Calendar Address	
LOCATION-TYPE	Property	RFC 9073 section 6.1. Location Type	
PARTICIPANT-TYPE	Property	RFC 9073 section 6.2. Participant Type	
RESOURCE-TYPE	Property	RFC 9073 section 6.3. Resource Type	
STRUCTURED-DATA	Property	RFC 9073 section 6.6. Structured-Data	
STYLED-DESCRIPTION	Property	RFC 9073 section 6.5. Styled-Description	
ACKNOWLEDGED	Property	RFC 9074 section 6.1. Acknowledged Property	
PROXIMITY	Property	RFC 9074 section 8.1. Proximity Property	
CONCEPT	Property	RFC 9253 section 8.1. Concept	
LINK	Property	RFC 9253 section 8.2. Link	
REFID	Property	RFC 9253 section 8.3. Refid	
ALTREP	Parameter	3.2.1. Alternate Text Representation	1.1.20.15.1
CN	Parameter	3.2.2. Common Name	1.1.13.1, 1.1.20.2.1, 1.1.20.16.1, 1.1.20.61.1
CUTYPE	Parameter	3.2.3. Calendar User Type	1.1.20.2.2
DELEGATED-FROM	Parameter	3.2.4. Delegators	
DELEGATED-TO	Parameter	3.2.5. Delegatees	
DIR	Parameter	3.2.6. Directory Entry Reference	
ENCODING	Parameter	3.2.7. Inline Encoding	1.1.20.1.1
FMTTYPE	Parameter	3.2.8. Format Type	1.1.20.1.2, 1.1.20.27.1
FBTYPE	Parameter	3.2.9. Free/Busy Time Type	
LANGUAGE	Parameter	3.2.10. Language	1.1.20.11.1, 1.1.20.15.2, 1.1.20.24.1
MEMBER	Parameter	3.2.11. Group or List Membership	
PARTSTAT	Parameter	3.2.12. Participation Status	1.1.20.2.3
RANGE	Parameter	3.2.13. Recurrence Identifier Range	
RELATED	Parameter	3.2.14. Alarm Trigger Relationship	
RELTYPE	Parameter	3.2.15. Relationship Type, RFC 9074 section 7.1. Relationship Type Property Parameter, RFC 9253 sections 4 and 5	
ROLE	Parameter	3.2.16. Participation Role	1.1.20.2.4
RSVP	Parameter	3.2.17. RSVP Expectation	1.1.20.2.5
SENT-BY	Parameter	3.2.18. Sent By	
TZID	Parameter	3.2.19. Time Zone Identifier	1.1.4.1, 1.1.5.1, 1.1.6.1, 1.1.7.1, 1.1.11.1, 1.1.12.1, 1.1.20.8.1, 1.1.20.9.1, 1.1.20.10.1, 1.1.20.13.1, 1.1.20.18.1, 1.1.20.20.1, 1.1.20.48.1
VALUE	Parameter	3.2.20. Value Data Types	1.1.20.1.3, 1.1.20.8.2, 1.1.20.10.2, 1.1.20.13.2, 1.1.20.18.2, 1.1.20.20.2, 1.1.20.39.1, 1.1.20.45.1
X-FILENAME	Parameter		1.1.20.1.4
X-MS-OLK-RESPTIME	Parameter		1.1.20.2.6
X-MICROSOFT-ISLEAPMONTH	Parameter		1.1.20.45.2
DISPLAY	Parameter	RFC 7986 section 6.1. DISPLAY Property Parameter	
EMAIL	Parameter	RFC 7986 section 6.2. EMAIL Property Parameter	
FEATURE	Parameter	RFC 7986 section 6.3. FEATURE Property Parameter	
LABEL	Parameter	RFC 7986 section 6.4. LABEL Property Parameter	
ORDER	Parameter	RFC 9073 section 5.1. Order	
SCHEMA	Parameter	RFC 9073 section 5.2. Schema	
DERIVED	Parameter	RFC 9073 section 5.3. Derived	
GAP	Parameter	RFC 9253 section 6.2. Gap	
LINKREL	Parameter	RFC 9253 section 6.1. Link Relation	

== Other representations ==
xCal is an XML representation of iCalendar data, as defined in RFC 6321.

jCal is a JSON representation of iCalendar data, as defined in RFC 7265.

hCalendar is an (x)HTML representation of a subset of iCalendar data using microformats.

hEvent is an HTML representation of a subset of iCalendar data using microformats addressing some accessibility concerns with the hCalendar format.

== See also ==
- CalDAV – Internet standard for sharing calendar data
- vCard – File format standard for electronic business cards
