= List of content syndication markup languages =

The following is a list of formats for web feeds for web syndication where content is made available from one website to other sites.

== Major markup languages ==
- Atom
- RSS

== Minor markup languages ==
- FeedSync
- GData Google Code
- hAtom
- H-feed
- Hina-Di
- LIRS
- NewsML
  - NewsML-G2
  - EventsML-G2
  - SportsML-G2
- ICE
- OCS
- OPDS
- OML
- OPML
- RDF feed
- RSS enclosure
- Simple List Extensions
- SyncML
- XOXO
- PubSubHubbub

== Specialized markup languages ==
- EventRSS - for social events
- GeoRSS - for transferring geoinformation
- Media RSS - for transferring Media content

== Historical ==
- CDF
- Marimba
- MCF
- NewsML 1
- PointCast
- SportsML
