= Photofeed =

Web feed of images

A photofeed is a web feed that features image enclosures. They provide an easy, standard way to reference a list of images with title, date and description.

Photofeeds are RSS enclosures of image file formats, similar to podcasts (enclosures of audio file formats).

== Feed format ==
A photofeed may be in the RSS 2.0 or Atom format.

== Image format ==
Enclosed images may be in the JPEG, GIF or PNG formats.

== Possibilities ==
A photofeed can contain:

- all pictures in an online album
- all images tagged with the keyword "sunset"
- an Amazon.com wishlist
- a list of houses for sale
- a list of desktop backgrounds (used by a screensaver)

== Photofeed aggregators ==
A photofeed aggregator is a piece of software that accepts subscribable RSS 2.0 syndication feeds and downloads or precaches higher resolution images (rather than thumbnails) for later viewing, such as when offline. There are not a tremendous number of photo aggregators yet. (please add)

- iPhoto from Apple, Inc.
- Zencast Organizer from Creative
- Google Photo Screensaver (Windows XP and Vista). Available with Google Pack or Picasa.

== See also ==
- Photocast, a similar but incompatible implementation by Apple Computer
