= Class attribute =

Class attribute may refer to:

- Class attribute (HTML), an HTML attribute which is a feature of many HTML and XHTML elements, typically to identify them for styles
- Class attributes (computer programming), defining the structure of a class

== See also ==
- Pseudo-class, in Cascading Style Sheets
- Span and div, practical usage of the HTML attribute
- Class (disambiguation)
