= Jay Martin Tenenbaum =

American computer scientist and Internet commerce pioneer

Marty Tenenbaum
- Born: 1945 (age 80–81)
- Citizenship: United States
- Education: MIT; Stanford University
- Spouse: Bonnie Tenenbaum
- Children: Joshua Tenenbaum
- Awards: Fellow, Association for the Advancement of Artificial Intelligence (1990)
- Scientific career
- Fields: Artificial intelligence Internet commerce
- Workplaces: SRI International; Schlumberger Palo Alto Research; Enterprise Integration Technologies; CommerceNet; Veo Systems; Commerce One; CollabRx; Cancer Commons; CureScience; XCures
- Thesis: Accommodation in computer vision (1971)
- Doctoral advisor: Jerome A. Feldman

Jay Martin "Marty" Tenenbaum is an American computer scientist and entrepreneur. He is noted for his early work in artificial intelligence and as an Internet commerce pioneer.

== Biography ==
Tenenbaum attended the Massachusetts Institute of Technology for his bachelor's and master's degrees in electrical engineering, graduating in 1964 and 1966 respectively. He then attended Stanford University for his PhD, working under Jerome A. Feldman. He worked at SRI International as a research scientist in artificial intelligence and ran the AI lab at Schlumberger Palo Alto Research from 1980 to 1988. After Schlumberger moved to Texas, Tenenbaum was unable to find another job as a research lab director and returned to Stanford. There, he worked with James D. Plummer on using the internet to coordinate large engineering projects. He left Stanford in 1990 and founded Enterprise Integration Technologies, which conducted the first commercial internet transaction, the first secure transaction, and the first online auction. He founded the global commerce consortium CommerceNet in 1994 and served as CEO until 1997. In 1997, he co-founded Veo Systems, a spin-off for-profit consulting firm from CommerceNet that pioneered the use of XML for automating business-to-business transactions, and joined Commerce One as Chief Scientist after it acquired Veo Systems in 1999. After leaving Commerce One in 2001, Tenenbaum was an officer and director of Webify Solutions (which was sold to IBM in 2006) and Medstory (which was sold to Microsoft in 2007). He also founded and served as chairman of CollabRx in 2008 and the non-profit network Cancer Commons in 2011.

In 1990, he was elected a fellow of the Association for the Advancement of Artificial Intelligence.

== Personal life ==
In 1995, Tenenbaum was diagnosed with metastatic melanoma. He underwent a Phase III trial of Canvaxin and survived, although the drug ultimately failed clinical trial.

Tenenbaum's son, Joshua Tenenbaum, is a professor of cognitive science at MIT.
