= Gdata =

Gdata may refer to:

- GData, the Google Data Protocol
- G Data CyberDefense, a software company
