= Rohit Khare =

Indian American computer scientist

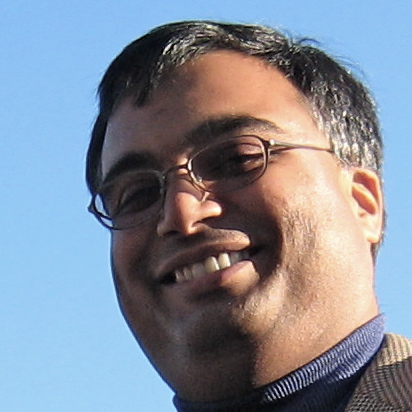
- Education: Caltech, UCI
- Occupation: Entrepreneur
- Website: https://rohit.khare.org/

Rohit Khare is an Indian American computer scientist and entrepreneur who has been active in many aspects of the development of the World Wide Web. He is the founder of Ångströ, the co-founder of KnowNow, a former director of CommerceNet Labs and a key player in the microformats community. He holds a Ph.D. and M.S. from the University of California, Irvine in software engineering, and bachelor's degrees from Caltech in Engineering & Applied Science and Economics. He previously worked on Internet security for the W3C. He is active in the Representational State Transfer (ReST) community, and in August 2007 wrote the ARRESTED paper on syndication-oriented architecture, a variant of service-oriented architecture.
