= Simple HTML Ontology Extensions =

In the semantic web, Simple HTML Ontology Extensions are a small set of HTML extensions designed to give web pages semantic meaning by allowing information such as class, subclass and property relationships.

SHOE was developed around 1996 by Sean Luke, Lee Spector, James Hendler, Jeff Heflin, and David Rager at the University of Maryland, College Park.

== See also ==
- Microformat
- Microdata (HTML)
