= HNews =

News Organisation

hNews is a microformat for news content developed by the Associated Press and the Media Standards Trust. hNews extends hAtom, introducing a number of fields that more completely describe a journalistic work. hNews also introduces rel-principles (a format that describes the journalistic principles upheld by the journalist or news organization that has published the news item). hNews will be one of several microformats open standards.

In July 2009, the Associated Press announced its plans to use the format for all of its text content.

In 2010, the John S. and James L. Knight Foundation awarded the Media Standards Trust a $350,000 Knight News Challenge grant to create hNews.
