= XCal =

xCal is an XML representation of the iCalendar standard. xCal is not an alternative nor next generation of iCalendar. xCal represents iCalendar components, properties and parameters as defined in iCalendar.

This format was selected to ease its translation back to the iCalendar format using an XSLT transform.

== Compatible software ==
The XML format of xCal lends itself to XML tools like Apache Cocoon, and allows for a server to deliver xCal, which is then transformed by a browser or other client using XSLT.
