= CommerceNet Singapore =

Not-for-profit organization based in California

CommerceNet Singapore Limited
- Type: Public, Limited by Guarantee
- Founded: 1997
- Headquarters: Singapore
- Key people: Charlie C. Tan, Founder (Singapore Chapter); Tay Kheng Tiong, Chairman; Wong Jeh Shyan, CEO; Ramesh Vakkiprath, COO
- Products: Technology incubation Catalyst Venture Funding; Online Certification
- Number of employees: 155 in group
- Website: www.cnsg.com.sg

CommerceNet Singapore is a not-for-profit organisation. It is part of the Palo Alto, California based global CommerceNet consortium of business partners that organises resources from the industry, plans and executes key strategies. CommerceNet Singapore seeks to sustain market initiatives that promote security, innovations and develop human, intellectual, financial and cultural capitals within the self-sustaining enterprise ecosystems.

CommerceNet Singapore has also assisted and turned around failing technopreneurs and entrepreneurs; reviving start ups and advising corporate entities in financial difficulties often prior to their bankruptcies. It has become one of the organisations acting as a place of last resort for those seeking assistance in Singapore.

== Goals ==
The consortium has been involved in initiatives that pioneer and advance new and usually untested technology. The consortium's main aim is to keep up a strategic role as a pilot project initiator. They usually influence and encourage innovation and driving progress in new areas of operation through grants, market access and other technical assistance. Although the name implies the geographic region of Singapore, the consortium is known to operate beyond its territory. As most members of the consortium are MNCs operating out of Singapore, CommerceNet Singapore follows its members to new markets regionally. This anomaly occurred as Singapore is known to host the 'operation headquarters' of many MNCs.

CommerceNet Singapore operates as a non-profit technology organization in ASEAN. Its early initiatives focused on establishing eCommerce and eBusiness practices. Its current member-driven projects include running technological test-beds to advance eBusiness, developing strategic industry initiatives, providing professional training, and offering mediation and certification services globally. Among its recognized programs is the Trust initiative, which promotes online commerce within Singapore and the ASEAN region.

In a strong departure from its earlier years, from 2006, CommerceNet Singapore had refocused to take on and implement a portfolio mix of long-term and short-term initiatives. Among the initiatives requested by its members are those of high-risk, untried and theoretical ideas that fulfil the promise of the general commercialisation of technologies, especially pertaining to the Internet, and project finance.

The structure of CommerceNet Singapore is designed to be neutral, allowing it tap market intelligence for more effective decision-making. New complex programmes are usually designed, redefined during incubation process or when implemented by CommerceNet Singapore. The projects are usually for industry-wide application, with focus often resulting to lowering of transaction costs and allowing the creation of new categories of products and services.

Fundings for the consortium come largely from sponsorships, membership dues, government grants, pilot projects grants as well as project management fees.

== History ==
The CommerceNet consortium history in Singapore is well documented. Its early days saw the consortium engaging many of the industry players in its daily activities. This has brought in large amount of financing to the consortium allowing it to grow rapidly.

The pro tem committee of CommerceNet Singapore signed the Global Partner MOU with CommerceNet. That brought Singapore member companies into the fold of the 500-strong CommerceNet members worldwide. The consortium also sits on Global Electronic Commerce Board (GECB). Following the MOU, CommerceNet Singapore was formed and incorporated in February 1998 as a not-for-profit public company limited by guarantee. Among the key initiators are entrepreneur Mr. Charlie Tan assisted by Dr. Toh See Kiat, a former Member of Parliament in Singapore.

The first inaugural board meeting was held in March 1998. Membership grew rapidly, and by April 1998, the consortium achieved 20 funding members. The consortium sent its representatives to GECB meeting in Amsterdam in April 1998. The first corporate members' meeting was held in May 1998, setting the tone and pace of the consortium in Singapore. CommerceNet Singapore become the first Singapore organisation to launch XML and Metadata seminar, held in November 1998. The high-profile international seminar attracted a keen following with more and more industry players joining the consortium.

The consortium set its sights beyond its members and launched a Common Accreditation Scheme to Enhance Trust known as "CaseTrust" in collaboration with Retail Promotion Centre and Consumer Association of Singapore in April 1999. It was a founding partner in Global Trustmark Alliance with BBBOnLine.

The consortium was promoting intellectual property protection, sitting on IP Taskforce and had worked with Business Software Alliance (BSA) to achieve its goal.

== Projects ==
- Curriculum Development
- Specialist Diploma Priogrammes
- ePublic Eye
- CaseTrust
- ConsumerTrust
- BusinessTrust
- PrivacyTrust
- TrustSg
- BSA Business Software Alliance Initiatives
- Market Intelligence Reports
- iTeknoCity
- ITCN Asia
- E-Global Conference
- E-Global Awards
- Singapore National Infocomm Awards
- PRT Assistance Programme
- Digital Printing Promotion
- Dadabhoy University
- Online Gaming Initiatives

== Investments ==
One specialty of CommerceNet Singapore is its ability to arrange funding for early-stage and high-risk projects. It has built a close working relationship with CNSG Consulting Group, which consists mostly of ex-CommerceNet Singapore's consultative partners, or CPs.

The common investment quantum varies from bite-size US$100,000 to syndicated US$10,000,000 for technological projects that have an industry-wide impact. Smaller amounts are usually given out as one-off grants, mostly to Singapore- and ASEAN-based companies. More than 515 companies in Singapore alone had received grants from CommerceNet Singapore from 2005 to end-2007, with the bulk approved for e-commerce and trustmark certification projects.

== Partners ==
CommerceNet Singapore collaborates with international consortia and agencies like KIEC, KOTBA, KOTRA, JIPDEC, ECOM, IE Singapore, SEDB, Singapore IDA and others including private sector industrial R&D Labs as well as universities, colleges and institutes of higher learning. CommerceNet Singapore also played an active role in Asia Trustmark Alliance (ATA) and worked closely within ATA framework with bodies like GBDe.
