= H-feed =

Minor markup language

h-feed is a draft Microformat for marking up a stream of posts using HTML class attributes. It is designed to support web pages that contain blog entries or similar chronological content (h-entry). These can then be parsed as feeds directly or via a proxy which converts h-feed to Atom or RSS, existing web syndication standards. It also supersedes the previous hAtom microformat also known as web slices.

Due to h-entry's ability to provide backward compatibility with hAtom it is used widely throughout the web and particularly by IndieWeb sites.

== h-entry ==
h-entry is used as the basis for individual posts of chronological web pages, such as news entries or blog posts. The "hentry" root class in h-entry was based on Atom's "entry" element.

== See also ==
- List of content syndication markup languages
