= Multimap.com =

Coordinates: 51.51453°N 0.10845°W

Multimap.com

Multimap.com was a provider of mapping and location-based services. Founded around 1997 and based in London, it was acquired by Microsoft in 2007 for $50 million. It was later merged into Bing Maps.

It offered street maps and door-to-door travel directions on a public web site. Other offerings included aerial photography, local information, and business services. Services were also offered through its partners, including accommodation, restaurant and train-ticket booking. It also sold historic and aerial photograph prints. Multimap offered discrete panning by clicking links, a form of user interaction later displaced by continuous panning 'slippy' maps. The Geo microformat was used to provide a Wikipedia map overlay generated from the official database download. This was used to browse geotagged articles.
