= MeCard (QR code) =

QR code format

MeCard is a data file similar to vCard but used by NTT DoCoMo in Japan in QR code format for use with Cellular Phones.

It is largely compatible with most QR-readers for smartphones. It is an easy way to share a contact with the most used fields. Usually, devices can recognize it and treat it like a contact ready to import.

MeCard is based in UTF-8 (which is ASCII compatible); the fields are separated with one semicolon (;), and the tags are separated with a colon (:). Compared to vCard, it needs very few chars due to the size limitation of QR Codes.

QR Code MeCard example using most of the format's fields

QR Code MeCard example containing the text MECARD:N:Doe,John;TEL:13035551212;EMAIL:john.doe@example.com;;

== Limitations ==
Compared to vCard, MeCard format only stores one single contact, a few labels, and a few data pieces to be set in a typical phonebook.

There is no place on the web that defines a standard for MeCard. It is not described by the ISO, nor is there an RFC for it. As of 2016, the page at NTT DoCoMo that originally defined the layout returns 404, and searching their web site for "MeCard" turns up only a few unrelated references.

== Structure ==
MeCard format starts with the tag MECARD and it finishes with two semicolons (;;)

The supported tags include:

Tag	i-mode compatible bar code recognition function	Description	Example
ADR	3.0	The physical delivery address. The fields divided by commas (,) denote PO box, room number, house number, city, prefecture, postal code and country, in order. (See note below.)	ADR:,,123 Main St.,Springfield,IL,12345,USA;
BDAY	3.0	8 digits for date of birth: year (4 digits), month (2 digits) and day (2 digits), in order	BDAY:19700310;
EMAIL	1.0	The address for electronic mail communication	EMAIL:johndoe@hotmail.com;
N	1.0	A structured representation of the name of the person. When a field is divided by a comma (,), the first half is treated as the last name and the second half is treated as the first name.	N:Doe,John;
NICKNAME	3.0	Familiar name for the object represented by this MeCard	NICKNAME:Johnny;
NOTE	1.0	Specifies supplemental information to be set as memo in the phonebook.	NOTE:I am proficient in Tiger-Crane Style,\nand I am more than proficient in the exquisite art of the Samurai sword.;
SOUND	1.0	Designates a text string to be set as the kana name in the phonebook. When a field is divided by a comma (,), the first half is treated as the last name and the second half is treated as the first name.	
TEL	1.0	The canonical number string for a telephone number for telephony communication	TEL:(123) 555-5832;
TEL-AV	2.0	The canonical string for a videophone number communication	TEL-AV:(123) 555-5832;
URL	3.0	A URL pointing to a website that represents the person in some way	URL:https://www.johndoe.com/

Note on the ADR: field: Although the original NTT DoCoMo page described the format as shown, in practice almost no QRCode apps that recognize MeCards decompose the address as a set of comma separated fields. They instead display the contents of the field directly. This indicates that, in practice, the field should be formatted according to local layout conventions.
