= Joshua Tenenbaum =

American cognitive scientist

Josh Tenenbaum
- Born: 21 August 1972 (age 54)
- Citizenship: United States
- Education: Yale University; MIT
- Known for: Bayesian cognitive science
- Awards: Fellow, Society of Experimental Psychologists (2007); Fellow, Cognitive Science Society (2013); Fellow, MacArthur (2019)
- Scientific career
- Fields: Artificial intelligence Cognitive science
- Workplaces: Stanford University; MIT
- Thesis: A Bayesian Framework for Concept Learning (1999)
- Doctoral advisor: Whitman Richards
- Doctoral students: Thomas L. Griffiths, Rebecca Saxe

Joshua Brett Tenenbaum (Josh Tenenbaum) is Professor of Computational Cognitive Science at the Massachusetts Institute of Technology. He is known for contributions to mathematical psychology and Bayesian cognitive science. According to the MacArthur Foundation, which named him a MacArthur Fellow in 2019, "Tenenbaum is one of the first to develop and apply probabilistic and statistical modeling to the study of human learning, reasoning, and perception, and to show how these models can explain a fundamental challenge of cognition: how our minds understand so much from so little, so quickly."

== Biography ==
Tenenbaum grew up in California. His mother was a teacher and his father is Internet commerce pioneer Jay Martin Tenenbaum.

His research direction was strongly influenced by his parents' interest in teaching and learning, and later by interactions with cognitive psychologist Roger Shepard, during his years at Yale.

Tenenbaum received his undergraduate degree in physics from Yale University in 1993, and his Ph.D. from MIT in 1999. His work focuses on analyzing probabilistic inference as the engine of human cognition and as a means to develop machine learning. According to the MacArthur Foundation, "Tenenbaum is one of the first to develop and apply probabilistic and statistical modeling to the study of human learning, reasoning, and perception, and to show how these models can explain a fundamental challenge of cognition: how our minds understand so much from so little, so quickly."

At MIT, Tenebaum is a professor of computational cognitive science and a member of CSAIL, MIT’s Computer Science and Artificial Intelligence Laboratory. He leads MIT's Computational Cognitive Science lab and is also head of an AI project called the MIT Quest for Intelligence.

In 2018, R & D Magazine named Tenenbaum their "Innovator of the Year."

In 2019, Tenenbaum was named a MacArthur Fellow. The MacArthur webpage describes his work as follows: "Combining computational models with behavioral experiments to shed light on human learning, reasoning, and perception, and exploring how to bring artificial intelligence closer to the capabilities of human thinking."

Tenenbaum's recent research includes teaching AI systems to imitate human face-recognition methods and programming AI to understand cause and effect.

== Publications ==
Tenenbaum has a list of his publications on his MIT web page and on Google Scholar.
