= Geo (microformat) =

Microformat to create metadata for location properties

A Geo microformat, detected on the Wikipedia page for Great Barr, by Firefox's Operator extension. Users may add alternative mapping sources to those shown, which are included by default.

Geo is a microformat used for marking up geographical coordinates (latitude and longitude) in HTML (or XHTML). Coordinates are expected in angular units of degrees and geodetic datum WGS84. Although termed a "draft" specification, the format is a de facto standard, stable and in widespread use; not least as a sub-set of the published hCalendar and hCard microformat specifications, neither of which is still a draft.

Use of Geo allows parsing tools (for example other websites, or Firefox's Operator extension) to extract the locations, and display them using some other website or web mapping tool, or to load them into a GPS device, index or aggregate them, or convert them into an alternative format.

== Usage ==
- If latitude is present, so must be longitude, and vice versa.
- The same number of decimal places should be used in each value, including trailing zeroes. (Note: Must and should are used per the IETF document RFC 2119)

The Geo microformat is applied using three HTML classes. For example, the marked-up text:

<div>Belvide: 52.686; -2.193</div>

becomes:

<div class="geo">
  Belvide:
  <span class="latitude">52.686</span>,
  <span class="longitude">-2.193</span>
</div>

by adding the class-attribute values "geo", "latitude" and "longitude".

This will display

Belvide: 52.686, -2.193

and a geo microformat for that location, Belvide Reservoir, which will be detected, on this page, by microformat parsing tools.

== hCard ==
Each Geo microformat may be wrapped in an hCard microformat, allowing for the inclusion of personal, organisational or venue names, postal addresses, telephone contacts, URLs, pictures, etc.

When

== Extensions ==
There are three proposals, none mutually-exclusive, to extend the geo microformat:

- geo-extension – for representing coordinates on other planets, moons etc., and with non-WGS84 schema
- geo-elevation – for representing altitude
- geo-waypoint – for representing routes and boundaries, using waypoints

== Users ==
Organisations and websites using Geo include:

- Flickr – on over three million photo pages
- Geograph – on over one million photo pages
- Google
- Multimap – all map pages
- OpenStreetMap – wiki pages about places, GPS traces and diary entries
- Wikipedia – embedded in geo templates of map-link pages
  - German Wikipedia – ditto
  - Dutch Wikipedia – ditto
  - Swedish Wikipedia – ditto
  - Italian Wikipedia
- Wikivoyage

Multiple organisations publishing hCard include a geo as part of that.

== h-geo ==
h-geo is the successor to the legacy hGeo format and implements the second-generation Microformats2 vocabulary, and is recommended for use in newer projects to take advantage of additional properties and rendering capabilities in modern browsers. h-geo This is applied using three HTML property classes. For example:

<div class="h-card">
  <span class="p-name">Belvide</span>
  <div class="p-location h-geo">
    <span class="p-latitude">52.686</span>
    <span class="p-longitude">-2.193</span>
  </div>
</div>

<div class="h-geo">Belvide: <span class="p-latitude">52.686</span>; <span class="p-longitude">-2.193</span>; <span class="p-altitude">120</span></div>

by adding the class-attribute values "h-geo", "p-latitude", "p-longitude", and "p-altitude".

=== Usage in Contacts ===
h-card, the successor to hCard, also implements the Microformats2 vocabulary for describing entities and their properties. As a result, coordinates should be embedded within h-cards using the h-geo format.

== See also ==
- GeoSPARQL, Geographic Information System (GIS) data for the W3C Semantic Web using the Resource Description Framework (RDF) and SPARQL
- Geo URI specified in RFC 5870
- ISO 6709
- ICBM address, an older geotagging format
- Schema.org, web standard schema.org/geo.
