= Web Slices =

Web feed technology

Web Slice
- Developed by: Microsoft
- Latest release: 0.9
- Type of format: Web syndication, Screen scraping
- Extended from: hAtom Microformat
- Open format?: Yes, As part of Microsoft Open Specification Promise
- Website: Web Slice Format Specification - Version 0.9

Web Slices are a web feed technology based on the hAtom Microformat that allows users to subscribe to portions of a web page. Microsoft developed the Web Slice format for Internet Explorer, and published a specification under their Open Specification Promise. The specification is not published by any independent standards body. Introduced in Internet Explorer 8 Beta 1, Web Slices can be previewed in a fly-out window. As of 2012, Internet Explorer 8 and 9 were the only browsers to support Web Slices natively, although Mozilla Firefox had support via an add-on called webchunks.

== Implementation ==
A Web Slice has 9 properties: the Web Slice id, entry title, entry content, end time, alternative display source, alternative navigation, alternative update source, and time to live. The 3 required properties are: the Web Slice id, entry title, and entry content.

To disable Web Slices on a web page, add:

<meta name="slice" scheme="IE" content="off"/>

To specify the default web slice on a page with multiple web slices, add:

<link
    rel="default-slice"
      <!-- Must be "default-slice" -->
    type="application/x-hatom" 
      <!-- Must be "application/x-hatom" -->
    href="id of webslice"
      <!-- The ID of the web slice -->
/>

=== Sample Webslice ===
<div class="hslice" id = "hslice-id goes here">
  <!-- The ID of the hSlice -->
    <div style="display:none" class=<"entry-title">Title goes here</div>
      <-- The title -->
    <span class="ttl" style="display:none">360</span>
      <!-- How often to refresh in minutes -->
    <abbr class="endtime" title="10 Jan 2020 00:00:00 UTC"></abbr>
      <!-- When the link expires -->
    <div class="entry-content">
        The content goes here
</div>

== Support ==
=== Mozilla Firefox ===
While Firefox does not have built in support for web slices, extensions have been created to give the ability to read web slices.

==== WebChunks ====
WebChunks is a Mozilla Firefox 3 implementation of Microsoft Webslices. It allows you to "follow" an area of a web page through a dedicated feed bookmarked in a new toolbar. With Greasemonkey, WebChunks can insert webchunks or webslices markup into any web page so the Webchunks extension handles it.

==== Fireclip ====
Fireclip is a Firefox addon that lets you "clip out" parts of a website and watch them for changes. It lets you track specific parts of a website in a similar manner to web slices.

===== PageSlices =====
Pageslices was another Firefox addon that allowed not only storing parts of websites but also organizing them by adding on custom pages.

=== Google Chrome ===
Google Chrome, like Firefox, does not have built in support for web slices. However, the extension API new to Chrome 4 allows extensions to be created to give the ability to relatively simply create arbitrary webslices of any content from any page.

=== Opera ===
Although it was rumored that Opera 10 would have support for web slices, this did not come to pass. Opera does have a "widgetize" feature likened to web slices which allows web pages to be displayed on a user's desktop.

== See also ==
- Live bookmarks
