= CollabRx =

CollabRx, Inc. was a company that offered cloud-based expert systems for selecting clinical treatments for molecular diseases such as cancer. Its technology revolved around dynamically updated molecular disease models that form the basis of the expert systems. One of the challenges evolving from the recent explosion in biological information is to distill actionable clinically relevant therapy approaches from the vast amount of data available. The knowledgebases that inform the models were updated by a large network of advisors from academic and medical institutions.

Access to the expert systems was offered under software-as-a-service contracts. A major user of the technology was expected to be DNA testing laboratories which hope to translate patient-specific genetic characterization to patient-specific clinical treatment advice for molecular diseases.

== History ==
CollabRx was founded in 2008 by computer scientist Jeff Shrager, Silicon Valley internet pioneer Jay Martin Tenenbaum, and mathematician Raphael Lehrer.

In July 2012, Tegal Corporation acquired CollabRx.

In October 2015, CollabRx was merged with Medytox solutions.
