= HCalendar =

Microformat

hCalendar (short for HTML iCalendar) is a microformat standard for displaying a semantic (X)HTML representation of iCalendar-format calendar information about an event, on web pages, using HTML classes and rel attributes.

It allows parsing tools (for example other websites, or browser add-ons like Firefox's Operator extension) to extract the details of the event, and display them using some other website, index or search them, or to load them into a calendar or diary program, for instance. Multiple instances can be displayed as timelines.

== Example ==
Consider this semi-fictional example:

   The English Wikipedia was launched
   on 15 January 2001 with a party from 
   2-4pm at 
   Jimmy Wales' house 
   (more information).

The HTML mark-up might be:

<p>
    The English Wikipedia was launched 
    on 15 January 2001 with a party from 
    2-4pm at 
    Jimmy Wales' house 
    (<a href="http://en.wikipedia.org/wiki/History_of_Wikipedia">more information</a>)
</p>

hCalendar mark-up may be added using span HTML elements and the classes vevent, summary, dtstart (start date), dtend (end date), location and url:

<p class="vevent">
    The <span class="summary">English Wikipedia was launched</span> 
    on 15 January 2001 with a party from 
    <abbr class="dtstart" title="2001-01-15T14:00:00+06:00">2pm</abbr>-
    <abbr class="dtend" title="2001-01-15T16:00:00+06:00">4pm</abbr> at 
    <span class="location">Jimmy Wales' house</span> 
    (<a class="url" href="http://en.wikipedia.org/wiki/History_of_Wikipedia">more information</a>)
</p>

Note the use of the abbr element to contain the machine readable, ISO8601, date-time format for the start and end times.

== Accessibility concerns ==
Concerns have been expressed that, where it occurs, the use of the abbr element (using the so-called abbr-design-pattern) in the above manner causes accessibility problems, not least for users of screen readers and aural browsers. The newer h-event microformat therefore uses the HTML5 element time instead:

<time class="dt-start" datetime="2013-06-30 12:00">30<sup>th</sup> June 2013, 12:00</time>

== Geo ==
The Geo microformat is a part of the hCalendar specification, and is often used to include the coordinates of the event's location within an hCalendar.

== Attributes ==
For a full list of attributes, see the hCalendar cheat-sheet.

== Users ==
Notable organisations and other websites using hCalendar include:

- Birmingham Town Hall and Symphony Hall
- Facebook
- Google (in Google maps and in Search Engine Results Pages)
- The Opera web browser website
- The Radio Times
- The University of Bath
- The University of Washington
- Upcoming.org
- Wikipedia
- Yahoo!, on Yahoo! Local
