= Operator (extension) =

- Geo microformat, detected on the Wikipedia page for Great Barr.
- Developer: Mike Kaply
- Stable release: 0.9.5.6 / July 31, 2010
- Operating system: Cross-platform
- Type: Firefox extension
- Website: Mike's Musings

Operator was an extension for the Mozilla Firefox web browser. It parses and acts upon a number of microformats, as well as validating them.

Operator lets the user access microformats through a number of methods, all of which are optional: a toolbar, a toolbar button, a status bar icon, a location bar icon, or a sidebar.

It has native support for several microformats:

- adr (adr spec) (postal addresses)
- hCard (contact/ address information)
- hCalendar (events)
- Geo (geographic coordinates)
- rel-tag

and is extensible, in that users can add new actions for the included microformats, or specify additional microformat recognition.

Operator was written by Mike Kaply of IBM. It forms the basis for Firefox 3's microformats API, allowing native support, but has no direct user interface, due to lack of consensus on the implementation in the GUI.

== See also ==
- List of Firefox extensions
