= HProduct =

Microformat for publishing product details

hProduct is a microformat for publishing details of products, on web pages, using (X)HTML classes and rel attributes.

On 12 May 2009, Google announced that they would be parsing the hProduct, hCard and hReview microformats, and using them to populate search result pages.
