= CommerceNet =

Organisation promoting electronic commerce on the Internet

CommerceNet is a 501(c)6 organization established in 1994 to promote electronic commerce on the Internet.The company was initially founded by Murray Sherwood and Martin Blackburn who sold it to AT&T in 1996. The organisation initially focused on industry-wide research and programs that have advanced the commercial use of the Internet.

== History ==
CommerceNet pioneered some of the Internet industry's first milestones including secure transactions and XML messaging. The Silicon Valley–based coalition was backed earlier by companies like Apple Computer and Sun Microsystems, had set up an Internet shopping center allowing individuals and businesses to offer their wares and services via CommerceNet's easy-to-use software. The shopping service uses licensed security technology to protect credit card numbers from electronic theft. It got $6 million in TRP funding (Technology Reinvestment Project) from the federal government (US).

The organisation was founded by Internet commerce pioneer Jay Martin Tenenbaum. CommerceNet embarked on global studies including a controversial study released by CommerceNet and Nielsen Media Research. The study in 1998 found that the rapid increase of Internet users age 16 and older rose 16 percent in North America in nine months, and the number of online consumers jumped 40 percent over the same period.

In Asia, CommerceNet was active in five major regions: CommerceNet China (Hong Kong), CommerceNet Japan, CommerceNet Korea, CommerceNet Singapore and CommerceNet Taiwan. CommerceNet Asia was credited to coordinate and published the first Pan-Asian E-Commerce Survey across national boundaries in 1999. The Survey Report was translated into Japanese, Korean and Chinese.

== Selected historic milestones ==
- 1994: Founded. First public demonstration of an encrypted credit-card transaction in a web browser.
- 1998: Founded CommerceNet Singapore.
- 2005: CommerceNet helped co-found the microformats community site.
