= RSS enclosure =

Pointer to a media file from a web feed

RSS enclosures are a way of attaching multimedia content to RSS feeds with the purpose of allowing that content to be prefetched. Enclosures provide the URL of a file associated with an entry, such as an MP3 file to a music recommendation or a photo to a diary entry. Unlike e-mail attachments, enclosures are merely hyperlinks to files. The actual file data is not embedded into the feed (unless a data URL is used). Support and implementation among aggregators varies: if the software understands the specified file format, it may automatically download and display the content, otherwise provide a link to it or silently ignore it.

The addition of enclosures to RSS, as first implemented by Dave Winer in late 2000 , was an important prerequisite for the emergence of podcasting, perhaps the most common use of the feature as of 2012. In podcasts and related technologies enclosures are not merely attachments to entries, but provide the main content of a feed.

== Syntax ==
In RSS 2.0, the syntax for the <enclosure> tag, an optional child of the <item> element, is as follows:

<enclosure url="http://example.com/file.mp3" length="123456789" type="audio/mpeg" />

where the value of the url attribute is a URL of a file, length is its size in bytes, and type its mime type.

It is recommended that only one <enclosure> element is included per <item>.

== Prefetching ==
The RSS <enclosure> has similarities to:

- the SMIL <prefetch> element,
- the HTML <link> element with rel="prefetch".
- the HTTP Link header with rel="prefetch". (See RFC 2068 section 19.6.2.4.)
- the Atom <link> element with rel="enclosure"

== See also ==
- Broadcatching
- Internet television
- Podcast
- Photofeed
- Vlog
