= HReview =

Microformat for publishing reviews

hReview is a microformat for publishing reviews of books, music, films, restaurants, businesses, holidays, etc. using (X)HTML on web pages, using HTML classes and rel attributes.

On the 12th of May 2009, Google announced that they would be parsing the hReview, hCard and hProduct microformats, and using them to populate search result pages.
