= HttpUnit =

Website testing framework

- Stable release: 1.7 / May 20, 2008
- Written in: Java
- Operating system: Cross-platform
- Size: 4.0 MB (archived)
- Type: software testing
- License: MIT
- Website: https://httpunit.sourceforge.net/

HttpUnit is an open-source software testing framework used to perform testing of web sites without the need for a web browser. HttpUnit supports HTML form submission, JavaScript, HTTP basic access authentication, automatic page redirection, and cookies. Written in Java, HttpUnit allows Java test code to process returned pages as text, XML DOM, or containers of forms, tables and links. HttpUnit is well suited to be used in combination with JUnit, in order to easily write tests that verify the proper behaviour of a web site.

The use of HttpUnit allows for automated testing of web applications and as a result, assists in regression testing.

== See also ==
- Software performance testing
- Performance Engineering
- Software
- HtmlUnit
