= RDFa =

Format for expressing RDF statements in HTML documents

RDF in Attributes
- Abbreviation: RDFa
- Status: Published
- Year started: 2004
- Editors: Ben Adida, Mark Birbeck
- Base standards: RDF
- Related standards: RDF Schema, OWL
- Domain: Semantic Web
- Website: www.w3.org/TR/rdfa-primer/

RDFa or Resource Description Framework in Attributes is a W3C Recommendation that adds a set of attribute-level extensions to HTML, XHTML and various XML-based document types for embedding rich metadata within web documents. The Resource Description Framework (RDF) data-model mapping enables the use of RDFs for embedding RDF subject-predicate-object expressions within XHTML documents. RDFa also enables the extraction of RDF model triples by compliant user agents.

The RDFa community runs a wiki website to host tools, examples, and tutorials.

== History ==
RDFa was first proposed by Mark Birbeck in the form of a W3C note entitled XHTML and RDF, which was then presented to the Semantic Web Interest Group at the W3C's 2004 Technical Plenary. Later that year the work became part of the sixth public Working Draft of XHTML 2.0. Although it is generally assumed that RDFa was originally intended only for XHTML 2, in fact the purpose of RDFa was always to provide a way to add metadata to any XML-based language. Indeed, one of the earliest documents bearing the RDF/A Syntax name has the sub-title A collection of attributes for layering RDF on XML languages. The document was written by Mark Birbeck and Steven Pemberton, and was made available for discussion on October 11, 2004.

In April 2007 the XHTML 2 Working Group produced a module to support RDF annotation within the XHTML 1 family. As an example, it included an extended version of XHTML 1.1 dubbed XHTML+RDFa 1.0. Although described as not representing an intended direction in terms of a formal markup language from the W3C, limited use of the XHTML+RDFa 1.0 DTD did subsequently appear on the public Web.

October 2007 saw the first public Working Draft of a document entitled RDFa in XHTML: Syntax and Processing. This superseded and expanded upon the April draft; it contained rules for creating an RDFa parser, as well as guidelines for organizations wishing to make practical use of the technology.

In October 2008 RDFa 1.0 reached recommendation status.

RDFa 1.1 reached recommendation status in June 2012. It differs from RDFa 1.0 in that it no longer relies on the XML-specific namespace mechanism. Therefore, it is possible to use RDFa 1.1 with non-XML document types such as HTML 4 or HTML 5. Details can be found in an appendix to HTML 5.

An additional RDFa 1.1 Primer document was last updated 17 March 2015. (The first public Working Draft dates back to 10 March 2006.)

== Versions and variants ==
There are some main well-defined variants of the basic concepts, that are used as reference and as abbreviation to the W3C standards.

=== HTML+RDFa ===
RDFa was defined in 2008 with the "RDFa in XHTML: Syntax and Processing" Recommendation. Its first application was to be a module of XHTML.

The HTML applications remained, "a collection of attributes and processing rules for extending XHTML to support RDF" expanded to HTML5, are now expressed in a specialized standard, the "HTML+RDFa" (the last is "HTML+RDFa 1.1 - Support for RDFa in HTML4 and HTML5").

=== RDFa 1.0 ===
The "HTML+RDFa" syntax of 2008 was also termed "RDFa 1.0", so, there is no "RDFa Core 1.0" standard. In general this 2008's RDFa 1.0 is used with the old XHTML standards (as long as RDFa 1.1 is used with XHTML5 and HTML5).

=== RDFa 1.1 ===
Is the first generic (for HTML and XML) RDFa standard; the "RDFa Core 1.1" is in the Third Edition, since 2015.

=== RDFa Lite ===
RDFa Lite is a W3C Recommendation (1.0 and 1.1) since 2009, where it is described as follows:

RDFa Lite is minimal subset of RDFa ... consisting of a few attributes that may be used to express machine-readable data in Web documents like HTML, SVG, and XML. While it is not a complete solution for advanced data markup tasks, it does work for most day-to-day needs and can be learned by most Web authors in a day.

RDFa Lite consists of five attributes: vocab, typeof, property, resource, and prefix. RDFa 1.1 Lite is upwards compatible with RDFa 1.1.

In 2009 the W3C was positioned to retain RDFa Lite as unique and definitive standard alternative to Microdata. The position was confirmed with the publication of the HTML5 Recommendation in 2014.

== Essence ==
The essence of RDFa is to provide a set of attributes that can be used to carry metadata in an XML language (hence the 'a' in RDFa).

These attributes are:

about
a URI or CURIE specifying the resource the metadata is about
rel and rev
specifying a relationship and reverse-relationship with another resource, respectively
src, href and resource
specifying the partner resource
property
specifying a property for the content of an element or the partner resource
content
optional attribute that overrides the content of the element when using the property attribute
datatype
optional attribute that specifies the datatype of text specified for use with the property attribute
typeof
optional attribute that specifies the RDF type(s) of the subject or the partner resource (the resource that the metadata is about).

== Benefits ==
There are five "principles of interoperable metadata" met by RDFa.

- Publisher Independence – each site can use its own standards
- Data Reuse – data are not duplicated. Separate XML and HTML sections are not required for the same content.
- Self Containment – the HTML and the RDF are separated
- Schema Modularity – the attributes are reusable

Additionally RDFa may benefit web accessibility as more information is available to assistive technology.

== Usage ==
There is a growing number of tools for better usage of RDFa vocabularies and RDFa annotation.

=== HTML+RDFa statistics ===
2013 survey pizza charts of percentage usage, showing that 79% of URLs and 43% of domains use HTML+RDFa. The average 61% (the other 39% was Microformats) is the usage indicator.

Simplified approaches to semantically annotate information items in webpages were greatly encouraged by the HTML+RDFa (released in 2008) and microformats (since ~2005) standards.

As of 2013 these standards were encoding events, contact information, products, and so on. Despite the vCard semantics (only basic items of person and organization annotations) dominance, and some cloning of annotations along the same domain, the counting of webpages (URLs) and domains with annotations is an important statistical indicator for usage of semantically annotated information in the Web.

The statistics of 2017 show that usage of HTML+RDFa is now less than that of Microformats.

=== RDFa editors ===
Web-based RDFa editors
There are already a few RDFa editors available online. RDFaCE (RDFa Content Editor) is a WYSIWYM editor based on TinyMCE to support RDFa content authoring. It supports manual and semi-automatic generation of RDFa with the support of annotation services such as DBpedia Spotlight, OpenCalais, Alchemy API, among others. RDFaCE-Lite is a version of RDFaCE also supporting Microdata and available as a WordPress plugin.
Desktop RDFa editors
AutôMeta is an environment for semi-automatic (or automatic) annotation of documents for publishing on the Web using RDFa. It also includes an RDFa extraction tool to provide the user with a view of the annotated triples. It is available in both CLI and GUI interfaces.

=== Examples ===
The following is an example of adding Dublin Core metadata to an XML element in an XHTML file. Dublin Core data elements are data typically added to a book or article (title, author, subject etc.)

<div xmlns:dc="http://purl.org/dc/elements/1.1/"
  about="http://www.example.com/books/wikinomics">
  <span property="dc:title">Wikinomics</span>
  <span property="dc:creator">Don Tapscott</span>
  <span property="dc:date">2006-10-01</span>
</div>

Moreover, RDFa allows the passages and words within a text to be associated with semantic markup:

<div xmlns:dc="http://purl.org/dc/elements/1.1/"
   about="http://www.example.com/books/wikinomics">
  In his latest book
  <span property="dc:title">Wikinomics</span>,
  <span property="dc:creator">Don Tapscott</span>
  explains deep changes in technology,
  demographics and business.
  The book is due to be published in
  <span property="dc:date" content="2006-10-01">October 2006</span>.
</div>

==== XHTML + RDFa 1.0 ====
The following is an example of a complete XHTML+RDFa 1.0 document. It uses Dublin Core and FOAF, an ontology for describing people and their relationships with other people and things:

<?xml version="1.0" encoding="UTF-8"?>
<!DOCTYPE html PUBLIC "-//W3C//DTD XHTML+RDFa 1.0//EN"
    "http://www.w3.org/MarkUp/DTD/xhtml-rdfa-1.dtd">
<html xmlns="http://www.w3.org/1999/xhtml"
    xmlns:foaf="http://xmlns.com/foaf/0.1/"
    xmlns:dc="http://purl.org/dc/elements/1.1/"
    version="XHTML+RDFa 1.0" xml:lang="en">
  <head>
    <title>John's Home Page</title>
    <base href="http://example.org/john-d/" />
    <meta property="dc:creator" content="Jonathan Doe" />
    <link rel="foaf:primaryTopic" href="http://example.org/john-d/#me" />
  </head>
  <body about="http://example.org/john-d/#me">
    <h1>John's Home Page</h1>
    <p>My name is <span property="foaf:nick">John D</span> and I like
      <a href="http://www.neubauten.org/" rel="foaf:interest"
        xml:lang="de">Einstürzende Neubauten</a>.
    </p>
    <p>
      My <span rel="foaf:interest" resource="urn:ISBN:0752820907">favorite
      book is the inspiring <span about="urn:ISBN:0752820907"><cite
      property="dc:title">Weaving the Web</cite> by
      <span property="dc:creator">Tim Berners-Lee</span></span></span>.
    </p>
  </body>
</html>

In the example above, the document URI can be seen as representing an HTML document, but the document URI plus the "#me" string http://example.org/john-d/#me represents the actual person, as distinct from a document about them. The foaf:primaryTopic in the header tells us the URI of the person the document is about. The foaf:nick property (in the first span element) contains a nickname for this person, and the dc:creator property (in the meta element) tells us who created the document. The hyperlink to the Einstürzende Neubauten website contains rel="foaf:interest", suggesting that John Doe is interested in this band. The URI of their website is a resource.

The foaf:interest inside the second p element is referring to a book by ISBN. The resource attribute defines a resource in a similar way to the href attribute, but without defining a hyperlink. Further into the paragraph, a span element containing an about attribute defines the book as another resource to specify metadata about. The book title and author are defined within the contents of this tag using the dc:title and dc:creator properties.

Here are the same triples when the above document is automatically converted to RDF/XML:

<?xml version="1.0" encoding="UTF-8"?>
<rdf:RDF xmlns:rdf="http://www.w3.org/1999/02/22-rdf-syntax-ns#"
    xmlns:foaf="http://xmlns.com/foaf/0.1/"
    xmlns:dc="http://purl.org/dc/elements/1.1/">
  <rdf:Description rdf:about="http://example.org/john-d/">
    <dc:creator xml:lang="en">Jonathan Doe</dc:creator>
    <foaf:primaryTopic>
      <rdf:Description rdf:about="http://example.org/john-d/#me">
        <foaf:nick xml:lang="en">John D</foaf:nick>
        <foaf:interest rdf:resource="http://www.neubauten.org/"/>
        <foaf:interest>
          <rdf:Description rdf:about="urn:ISBN:0752820907">
            <dc:creator xml:lang="en">Tim Berners-Lee</dc:creator>
            <dc:title xml:lang="en">Weaving the Web</dc:title>
          </rdf:Description>
        </foaf:interest>
      </rdf:Description>
    </foaf:primaryTopic>
  </rdf:Description>
</rdf:RDF>

==== HTML5 + RDFa 1.1 ====
The above example can be expressed without XML namespaces in HTML5:

<html prefix="dc: http://purl.org/dc/elements/1.1/" lang="en">
  <head>
    <title>John's Home Page</title>
    <link rel="profile" href="http://www.w3.org/1999/xhtml/vocab" />
    <base href="http://example.org/john-d/" />
    <meta property="dc:creator" content="Jonathan Doe" />
    <link rel="foaf:primaryTopic" href="http://example.org/john-d/#me" />
  </head>
  <body about="http://example.org/john-d/#me">
    <h1>John's Home Page</h1>
    <p>My name is <span property="foaf:nick">John D</span> and I like
      <a href="http://www.neubauten.org/" rel="foaf:interest"
        lang="de">Einstürzende Neubauten</a>.
    </p>
    <p>
      My <span rel="foaf:interest" resource="urn:ISBN:0752820907">favorite
      book is the inspiring <span about="urn:ISBN:0752820907"><cite
      property="dc:title">Weaving the Web</cite> by
      <span property="dc:creator">Tim Berners-Lee</span></span></span>.
    </p>
  </body>
</html>

Note how the prefix foaf is still used without declaration. RDFa 1.1 automatically includes prefixes for popular vocabularies such as FOAF.

The minimal document is:

<html lang="en">
  <head>
    <title>Example Document</title>
  </head>
  <body vocab="http://schema.org/">
    <p typeof="Blog">
      Welcome to my <a property="url" href="http://example.org/">blog</a>.
    </p>
  </body>
</html>

That is, it is recommended that all of these attributes are used: vocab, typeof, property; not only one of them.

RDFa Structured Data Example

Person Schema in RDFa.

<div vocab="http://schema.org/" typeof="Person">
  <a property="image" href="http://manu.sporny.org/images/manu.png">
    <span property="name">Manu Sporny</span></a>, 
  <span property="jobTitle">Founder/CEO</span>
  <div>
    Phone: <span property="telephone">(540) 961-4469</span>
  </div>
  <div>
    E-mail: <a property="email" href="mailto:(your emailid)">msporny@digitalbazaar(.)com</a>
  </div>
  <div>
    Links: <a property="url" href="http://manu.sporny.org/">Manu's homepage</a>
  </div>
</div>

== See also ==
- GRDDL, a way to extract (annotated) data out of XHTML and XML documents and transform it into an RDF graph
- Microdata - another approach at embedding semantics in HTML using additional attributes
- Microformats, a simplified approach to semantically annotate data in web pages
- Open Graph protocol, a way to use RDFa to integrate web pages into the Facebook social graph
- Schema.org, search-engine supported schemas for structured data markup on web pages that can be expressed as RDFa
