= Bing Health =

Health service of Microsoft Bing

- Screenshot Bing Health displaying results of the search term "Common Cold"
- Website type: Search engine
- Owner: Microsoft
- Website: www.bing.com
- Launched: January 12, 2010; 16 years ago
- Current status: Closed

Bing Health (previously Live Search Health) was a search engine specifically for health-related information through a variety of trusted and credible sources, including Medstory, Mayo Clinic, National Institutes of Health's MedlinePlus, as well as from Wikipedia. It was discontinued as a standalone project in July 2015 and it was integrated into a more integrated experience within Microsoft’s broader AI and search ecosystem.

== History ==
Bing Health came about as a result of the Microsoft's acquisition of Medstory in February 2007, gaining a foothold in the health search and health information market. It was released for beta testing on October 8, 2007 as Live Search Health and served as the front-end to Microsoft HealthVault Search. Search results in Live Search Health were presented in a three-column layout with health-related articles from the trusted sources in the left, web search results in the middle, and sponsored results on the right. The topic dashboard also displays relevant topics, and allow users to add the search results to their scrapbook in Microsoft HealthVault Account. One particular feature for Live Search Health is that all health search queries and responses were encrypted to provide a measure of privacy and security when dealing with health issues.

However, on June 3, 2009, the Live Search Health front-end became fully integrated into Bing search results, accessible only via the "Explorer pane" on the left when the contextual search engine detects a health-related search query entered.

As of 2026, responses to many health-related queries on Microsoft platforms are generated and delivered through Microsoft Copilot, an AI-powered assistant that provides summarized information from multiple sources. Copilot

On January 10, 2010, Bing Health search results got an upgrade. Typing in a specific illness will now highlight important information such as related conditions, and common medications to reduce symptoms. In addition reference materials and documentation about the disease and its history was shown.

Bing Health was only available in the United States.

== See also ==
- Bing
- Microsoft HealthVault
- Windows Live
