= Semantic social network =

A semantic social network is the result of the application of Semantic Web technologies to social networks and online social media.

== History ==
The term Semantic Social Networks was coined independently by Stephen Downes and Marco Neumann in 2004 to describe the application of Semantic Web technologies and online social networks. In particular the use of RDF, FOAF and social network metrics for "SNEACHTA", a community portal project, to improve search results for online resources and content management for personalized content selection and display demonstrates this concept. A Semantic Social Network Portal project applied to the PUII (Programme for University Industry Interface) to support efforts in enterprise training units to identify up-skilling needs of the employee in the company and to simplify the creation and reuse of knowledge in online communities. In 2005 the concepts of Semantic Social Networks were applied to the Lotico Semantic Web to demonstrate the effectiveness of the research results to augmented communities of interest. In 2007 a team of French researchers at INRIA applied Semantic Social Network concepts and established formal methods for ontology matching. And in 2009 more researchers around the world started to implement Semantic Social Networks amongst them a team in Iran applied the concepts of Semantic Social Networks in order to facilitate organizational collaboration and expertise finding in decentralized organizations to Rayan Faragard, a software development company. They then performed social network analysis from the network they had gathered by FOAF tags which showed that using semantic social networks greatly increases the reliability, effectiveness and collaboration.
