= Div and span =

HTML elements used to define parts of a document

In HTML, the standard markup language for documents designed to be displayed in a web browser, <div> and <span> tags are elements used to define parts of a document, so that they are identifiable when a unique classification is necessary. Where other HTML elements such as <p> (paragraph), <em> (emphasis), and so on, accurately represent the semantics of the content, the additional use of <span> and <div> tags leads to better accessibility for readers and easier maintainability for authors. Where no existing HTML element is applicable, <div> and <span> can valuably represent parts of a document so that HTML attributes such as class, id, lang, or dir can be applied.

<span> represents an inline portion of a document, for example words within a sentence. <div> stands for "division", and represents a block-level portion of a document such as a few paragraphs or an image with its caption. The elements allow semantic attributes (e.g. lang="en-US"), CSS styling (e.g., color and typography), and client-side scripting (e.g., animation, hiding, and augmentation) to be applied.

== Examples ==
For example, to make a certain part of text inside a paragraph red, <span> can be used as follows (Note: As <div> is not permitted within <p>):

HTML syntax
(web code used to add formatting to text)

I am <span style="color: red;">red</span> and I am <span style="color: blue;">blue</span>!

Rendered output
(as seen by visitors of the webpage)

I am red and I am blue!

== History ==
The <span> element was introduced to HTML in the internationalization working group's second draft html-i18n in 1995. However, it was not until HTML 4.01 that it became part of the HTML language, appearing in the HTML 4 W3C Working Draft in 1997.

<span> was introduced to mark up any inline span of text, because "a generic container is needed to carry the LANG and BIDI attributes in cases where no other element is appropriate." It still serves that general purpose, although a much richer range of semantic elements have been defined since then, and there are also many more attributes that may need to be applied.

== Differences and default behaviour ==
There are multiple differences between <div> and <span>. The most notable difference is how the elements are displayed. In standard HTML, a <div> is a block-level element whereas a <span> is an inline element. The <div> block visually isolates a section of a document on the page, and may contain other block-level components. The <span> element contains a piece of information inline with the surrounding content, and may only contain other inline-level components. In practice, the default display of the elements can be changed by the use of Cascading Style Sheets (CSS), although the permitted contents of each element may not be changed. For example, regardless of CSS, a <span> element may not contain block-level children.

== Practical use ==
<span> and <div> elements are used purely to imply a logical grouping of enclosed elements.

There are three main reasons to use <span> and <div> tags with class or id attributes:

=== Styling with CSS ===
It is common for <span> and <div> elements to carry class or id attributes in conjunction with CSS to apply layout, typographic, color, and other presentation attributes to parts of the content. CSS does not just apply to visual styling: when spoken out loud by a voice browser, CSS styling can affect speech-rate, stress, richness and even position within a stereophonic image.

For these reasons, and in support of a more semantic web, attributes attached to elements within HTML should describe their semantic purpose, rather than merely their intended display properties in one particular medium. For example, the HTML in <span class="red-bold">password too short</span> is semantically weak, whereas <em class="warning">password too short</em> uses an <em> element to signify emphasis (appearing as text in italics), and introduces a more appropriate class name. By the correct use of CSS, such "warnings" may be rendered in a red, bold font on a screen, but when printed out they may be omitted, as by then it is too late to do anything about them. Perhaps when spoken they should be given extra stress, and a small reduction in speech-rate. The second example is semantically richer markup, rather than merely presentational.

=== Semantic clarity ===
This grouping and labelling of parts of the page content might be introduced to make the page more semantically meaningful in general terms.

For some years, the World Wide Web Consortium (W3C) has been running a major Semantic Web project designed to make the whole web increasingly useful and meaningful to today's and the future's information systems.

The microformats movement is an attempt to build an idea of semantic classes. For example, microformats-aware software might automatically find an element like <span class="tel">123-456-7890</span> and allow for automatic dialing of the telephone number.

=== Access from code ===
Once the HTML or XHTML markup is delivered to a page-visitor's client browser, there is a chance that client-side code will need to navigate the internal structure (or Document Object Model) of the web page. The most common reason for this is that the page is delivered with client-side JavaScript that will produce on-going dynamic behaviour after the page is rendered. For example, if rolling the mouse over a "Buy now" link is meant to make the price, elsewhere on the page, become emphasized, JavaScript code can do this, but JavaScript needs to identify the price element, wherever it is in the markup. The following markup would suffice: <div class="price">$45.99</div>. Another example is the Ajax programming technique, where, for example, clicking a hypertext link may cause JavaScript code to retrieve the text for a new price quotation to display in place of the current one within the page, without re-loading the whole page. When the new text arrives back from the server, the JavaScript must identify the exact region on the page to replace with the new information.

Automatic testing tools also may need to navigate web page markup using <span> and <div> elements' class or id attributes. In dynamically generated HTML, this may include the use of page testing tools such as HttpUnit, a member of the xUnit family, and load or stress testing tools such as Apache JMeter when applied to form-driven web sites.

== Overuse ==
The judicious use of <div> and <span> is a vital part of HTML and XHTML markup. However, they are sometimes overused.

Various list structures available in HTML may be preferable to a home-made mixture of <div> and <span> elements.

For example, this:

<ul class="menu">
  <li>Main page</li>
  <li>Contents</li>
  <li>Help</li>
</ul>

which produces

- Main page
- Contents
- Help

... is usually preferable instead of this:

<div class="menu">
  <span>Main page</span>
  <span>Contents</span>
  <span>Help</span>
</div>

which produces

 Main page
 Contents
 Help

Other examples of the semantic use of HTML rather than <div> and <span> elements include the use of <fieldset> elements to divide up a web form, the use of <legend> elements to identify such divisions and the use of <label> to identify form <input> elements rather than <div>, <span> or <table> elements used for such purposes.

HTML5 introduced several new elements; a few examples include the <header>, <footer>, <nav> and <figure> elements. The use of semantically appropriate elements provides better structure to HTML documents than <span> or <div>.

== See also ==
- HTML and HTML5
- HTML element
- HTML attribute
- Cascading Style Sheets and Help:Cascading Style Sheets
- CDATA
- ContextObjects in Spans (COinS)
- JavaScript
- Semantic Web
