= Google Data Protocol =

Protocol for reading and writing data

GData
- Stable release: 2.0.17 / April 20, 2012
- Written in: Java, JavaScript, .NET, PHP, Python and Objective-C.
- Operating system: Cross-platform
- Type: Software development tools
- Website: developers.google.com/gdata/

GData (Google Data Protocol) provides a simple protocol for reading and writing data on the Internet, designed by Google. GData combines common XML-based syndication formats (Atom and RSS) with a feed-publishing system based on the Atom Publishing Protocol, plus some extensions for handling queries. It relies on XML or JSON as a data format.

According to the Google Developers portal, "The Google Data Protocol is a REST-inspired technology for reading, writing, and modifying information on the web. It is used in some older Google APIs." However, "Most Google APIs are not Google Data APIs."

Google provides GData client libraries for Java, JavaScript, .NET, PHP, Python, and Objective-C.

== Implementations ==
An implementation called libgdata written in C is available under the LGPL license.

== See also ==
- Open Data Protocol (OData) – competing protocol from Microsoft
- GData API Directory
- Resource Description Framework (RDF) – a similar concept by W3C
