= History of web syndication technology =

Web syndication technologies were preceded by metadata standards such as the Meta Content Framework (MCF) and the Resource Description Framework (RDF), as well as by push specifications such as the Channel Definition Format (CDF). Early web syndication standards included the Information and Content Exchange (ICE) and RSS. More recent specifications include Atom and GData.

== Predecessors ==
Web syndication specifications were preceded by several formats in push and metadata technologies, few of which achieved widespread popularity. Many, such as Backweb and Pointcast, were intended to work only with a single service.

Between 1995 and 1997, Ramanathan V. Guha and others at Apple Computer's Advanced Technology Group developed the Meta Content Framework (MCF). MCF was a specification for structuring metadata information about web sites and other data, implemented in HotSauce, a 3D flythrough visualizer for the web. When the research project was discontinued in 1997, Guha left Apple for Netscape.

Guha and the XML co-creator Tim Bray extended MCF into an XML application that Netscape submitted to the World Wide Web Consortium (W3C) as a proposed web standard in June 1997. This submission contributed towards the emergence of the Resource Description Framework (RDF).

In March 1997, Microsoft submitted a detailed specification for the 'push' technology Channel Definition Format (CDF) to the W3C. This format was designed for the Active Channel feature of Internet Explorer 4.0. CDF never became popular, perhaps because of the extensive resources it required at a time when people were mostly on dial-up. Backweb and Pointcast were geared towards news, much like a personal application programming interface (API) feed. Backweb later morphed into providing software updates, a precursor to the push update features used by various companies now.

In September 1997, Netscape previewed a new, competing technology named "Aurora," based on RDF, a metadata model whose first public working draft would be posted the next month by a W3C working group that included representatives of many companies, including R.V. Guha of Netscape.

In December 1997, Dave Winer designed his own XML format for use on his Scripting News weblog.

== Early web syndication: ICE and RSS ==
The first standard created specifically for web syndication was Information and Content Exchange (ICE), which was proposed by Firefly Networks and Vignette in January 1998. The ICE Authoring Group included Microsoft, Adobe, Sun, CNET, National Semiconductor, Tribune Media Services, Ziff Davis and Reuters, amongst others, and was limited to thirteen companies. The ICE advisory council included nearly a hundred members.

ICE was submitted to the World Wide Web Consortium standards body on 26 October 1998, and showcased in a press event the day after. The standard failed to benefit from the open-source implementation that W3C XML specifications often received.

RDF Site Summary, the first web syndication format to be called "RSS", was offered by Netscape in March 1999 for use on the My Netscape portal. This version became known as RSS 0.9.

In July 1999, responding to comments and suggestions, Dan Libby produced a prototype tentatively named RSS 0.91 (RSS standing for Rich Site Summary at that time), that simplified the format and incorporated parts of Winer's scripting news format. This they considered an interim measure, with Libby suggesting an RSS 1.0-like format through the so-called Futures Document.

In April 2001, in the midst of AOL's acquisition and subsequent restructuring of Netscape properties, a re-design of the My Netscape portal removed RSS/XML support. The RSS 0.91 DTD was removed during this re-design, but in response to feedback, Dan Libby was able to restore the DTD, but not the RSS validator previously in place. In response to comments within the RSS community at the time, Lars Marius Garshol, to whom authorship of the original 0.9 DTD is sometimes attributed, commented, "What I don't understand is all this fuss over Netscape removing the DTD. A well-designed RSS tool, whether it validates or not, would not use the DTD at Netscape's site in any case. There are several mechanisms which can be used to control the dereferencing of references from XML documents to their DTDs. These should be used. If not the result will be as described in the article."

Effectively, this left the format without an owner, just as it was becoming widely used.

== Initial adoption of RSS (2000–2003) ==
A working group and mailing list, RSS-DEV, was set up by various users and XML notables to continue its development. At the same time, Winer unilaterally posted a modified version of the RSS 0.91 specification to the Userland website, since it was already in use in their products. He claimed the RSS 0.91 specification was the property of his company, UserLand Software.

Since neither side had any official claim on the name or the format, arguments raged whenever either side claimed RSS as its own, creating what became known as the RSS fork.

The RSS-DEV group went on to produce RSS 1.0 in December 2000. Like RSS 0.9 (but not 0.91) this was based on the RDF specifications, but was more modular, with many of the terms coming from standard metadata vocabularies such as Dublin Core.

Nineteen days later, Winer released by himself RSS 0.92, a minor and supposedly compatible set of changes to RSS 0.91 based on the same proposal. In April 2001, he published a draft of RSS 0.93 which was almost identical to 0.92. A draft RSS 0.94 surfaced in August, reverting the changes made in 0.93, and adding a type attribute to the description element.

In September 2002, Winer released a final successor to RSS 0.92, known as RSS 2.0 and emphasizing "Really Simple Syndication" as the meaning of the three-letter abbreviation. The RSS 2.0 spec removed the type attribute added in RSS 0.94 and allowed people to add extension elements using XML namespaces. Several versions of RSS 2.0 were released, but the version number of the document model was not changed.

In November 2002, The New York Times began offering its readers the ability to subscribe to RSS news feeds related to various topics. In January 2003, Winer called the New York Times' adoption of RSS the "tipping point" in driving the RSS format's becoming a de facto standard.

In July 2003, Winer and Userland Software assigned ownership of the RSS 2.0 specification to his then workplace, Harvard's Berkman Center for the Internet & Society.

== Development of Atom (2003) ==
In 2003, the primary method of web content syndication was the RSS family of formats. Developers who wished to overcome the limitations of these formats were unable to make changes directly to RSS 2.0 because the specification was copyrighted by Harvard University and "frozen," stating that "no significant changes can be made and it is intended that future work be done under a different name".

In June 2003, Sam Ruby set up a wiki to discuss what makes "a well-formed log entry." This posting acted as a rallying point. People quickly started using the wiki to discuss a new syndication format to address the shortcomings of RSS. It also became clear that the new format could also form the basis of a more robust replacement for blog editing protocols such as Blogger API and LiveJournal XML-RPC Client/Server Protocol.

The project aimed to develop a web syndication format that was:

- "100% vendor neutral,"
- "implemented by everybody,"
- "freely extensible by anybody, and"
- "cleanly and thoroughly specified."

In short order, a project road map was built. The effort quickly attracted more than 150 supporters including Dave Sifry of Technorati, Mena Trott of Six Apart, Brad Fitzpatrick of LiveJournal, Jason Shellen of Blogger, Jeremy Zawodny of Yahoo!, Timothy Appnel of the O'Reilly Network, Glenn Otis Brown of Creative Commons and Lawrence Lessig. Other notables supporting Atom include Mark Pilgrim, Tim Bray, Aaron Swartz, Joi Ito, and Jack Park. Also, Dave Winer, the key figure behind RSS 2.0, gave tentative support to the Atom endeavor (which at the time was called Echo.)

After this point, discussion became chaotic, due to the lack of a decision-making process. The project also lacked a name, tentatively using "Pie," "Echo," and "Necho" before settling on Atom. After releasing a project snapshot known as Atom 0.2 in early July 2003, discussion was shifted off the wiki.

The discussion then moved to a newly set up mailing list. The next and final snapshot during this phase was Atom 0.3, released in December 2003. This version gained widespread adoption in syndication tools, and in particular it was added to several Google-related services, such as Blogger, Google News, and Gmail. Google's Data APIs (Beta) GData are based on Atom 1.0 and RSS 2.0.

== Atom 1.0 and IETF standardization ==
In 2004, discussions began about moving the Atom project to a standards body such as the W3C or the Internet Engineering Task Force (IETF). The group eventually chose the IETF and the Atompub working group was formally set up in June 2004, finally giving the project a charter and process. The Atompub working group is co-chaired by Tim Bray (the co-editor of the XML specification) and Paul Hoffman. Initial development was focused on the syndication format.

The final draft of Atom 1.0 was published in July 2005 and was accepted by the IETF as a "proposed standard" in August 2005. Work then continued on the further development of the publishing protocol and various extensions to the syndication format.

The Atom Syndication Format was issued as a proposed "internet official protocol standard" in IETF RFC 4287 in December 2005 with the help of the co-editors Mark Nottingham and Robert Sayre.

== Post-Atom technical developments related to web syndication ==
In January 2005, Sean B. Palmer, Christopher Schmidt, and Cody Woodard produced a preliminary draft of RSS 1.1. It was intended as a bugfix for 1.0, removing little-used features, simplifying the syntax and improving the specification based on the more recent RDF specifications. As of July 2005, RSS 1.1 had amounted to little more than an academic exercise.

In April 2005, Apple released Safari 2.0 with RSS Feed capabilities built in. Safari delivered the ability to read RSS feeds, and bookmark them, with built-in search features. Safari's RSS button is a blue rounded rectangle with "RSS" written inside in white. The favicon displayed defaults to a newspaper icon.

In November 2005, Microsoft proposed its Simple Sharing Extensions to RSS.

In December 2005, Microsoft announced in blogs that Internet Explorer 7 and Microsoft Outlook 12 (Outlook 2007) will adopt the feed icon first used in the Mozilla Firefox, effectively making the orange square with white radio waves the industry standard for both RSS and related formats such as Atom. Also in February 2006, Opera Software announced they too would add the orange square in their Opera 9 release.

In January 2006, Rogers Cadenhead relaunched the RSS Advisory Board in order to move the RSS format forward.

In January 2007, as part of a revitalization of Netscape by AOL, the FQDN for my.netscape.com was redirected to a holding page in preparation for an impending relaunch, and as a result some news feeders using RSS 0.91 stopped working. The DTD has again been restored.

== HTML5 ==
In 2013, the Candidate Recommendation for HTML5 included explicit provision for syndication by introducing the 'article' element.

== See also ==
- History of the World Wide Web
