= Naval Ravikant =

American entrepreneur and investor (born 1974)

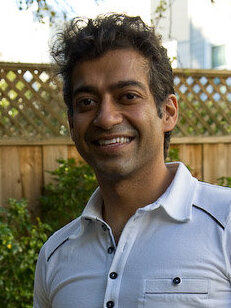
- Ravikant in 2009
- Born: November 5, 1974 (age 51); New Delhi, India
- Education: Stuyvesant High School
- Alma mater: Dartmouth College (BS)
- Occupations: Entrepreneur, Investor
- Years active: 1999–present
- Known for: AngelList Epinions
- Website: nav.al

Naval Ravikant (born November 5, 1974) is an Indian-born American entrepreneur and investor. He is the co-founder and chairman of AngelList, a platform for startups, investors, and job seekers. He is an angel investor who has made early-stage investments in companies including Uber, Twitter, Postmates, and Yammer. Ravikant is a recipient of the Edmund Hillary Fellowship. He also co-hosts a podcast with Brett Hall.

== Early life and education ==
Ravikant was born in New Delhi, India, in 1974. He moved to New York City with his mother and his brother, Kamal, when he was 9 years old. He attended Stuyvesant High School and graduated in 1991. In 1995, he graduated from Dartmouth College with degrees in computer science and economics. During college, he interned at the law firm Davis Polk & Wardwell.

== Career ==
After graduating, Ravikant briefly worked at Boston Consulting Group before moving to Silicon Valley.

In 1999, Ravikant co-founded the consumer product review site Epinions. The company raised $45 million in venture capital from firms including Benchmark Capital and August Capital. In 2003, Epinions merged with the comparison pricing site Dealtime to become Shopping.com, which held an Initial public offering (IPO) in October 2004.

In January 2005, Ravikant and three of his co-founders filed a lawsuit against Benchmark Capital, August Capital, and co-founder Nirav Tolia, alleging they were misled into approving the merger under the pretense that the company was worth less than the capital raised, making their shares worthless. The lawsuit was settled in December 2005.

Around 2007, Ravikant started a $20 million early-stage venture capital fund named The Hit Forge. The fund invested in startups including Twitter, Uber, and Stack Overflow.

In 2007, Ravikant began co-writing a blog called Venture Hacks, which offered detailed advice on negotiating term sheets. That blog evolved into AngelList, which Ravikant co-founded in 2010 as a platform for startups to connect with angel investors. AngelList also operates the product discovery platform Product Hunt. In 2022, AngelList Venture raised funds at a $4 billion valuation.

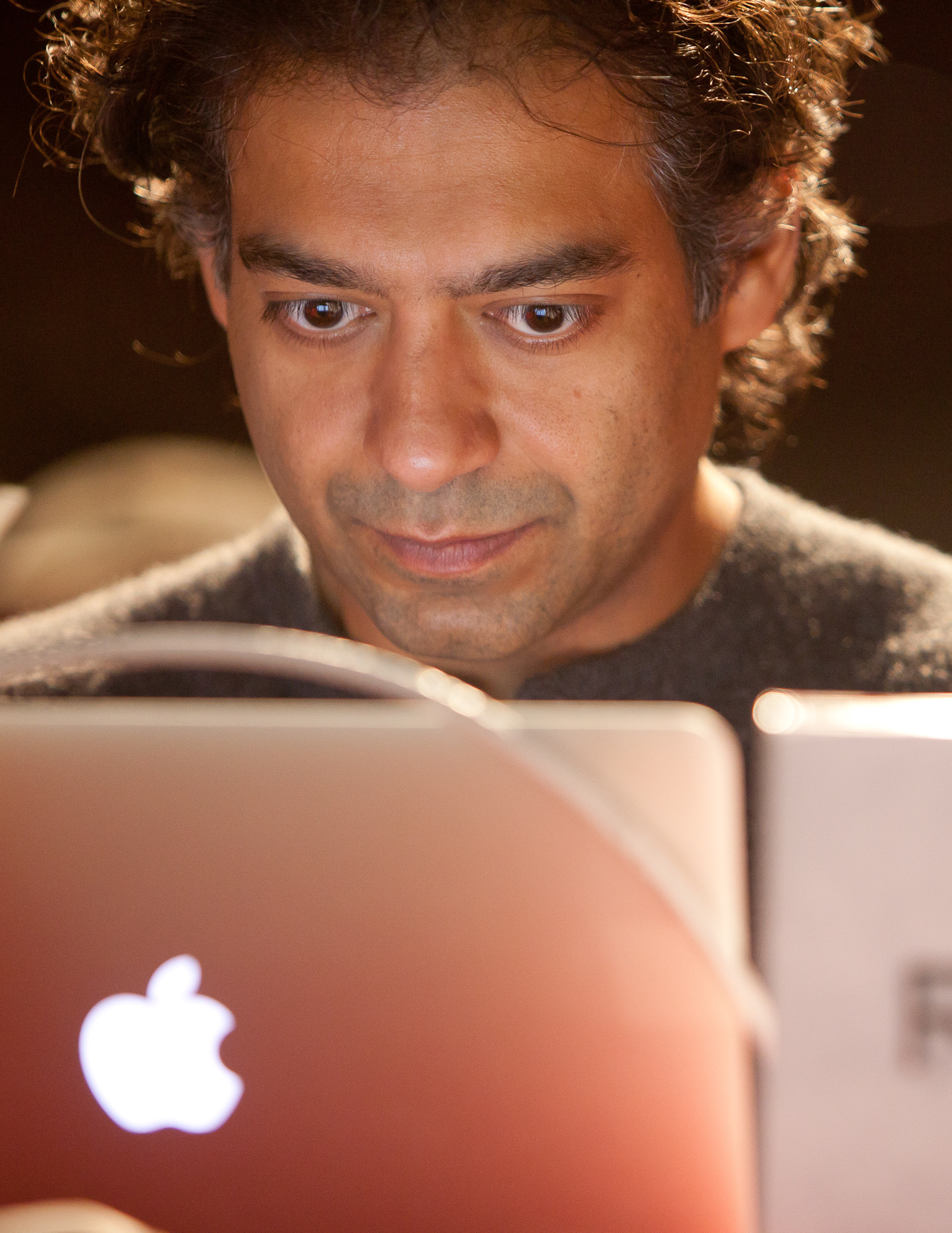
Ravikant in 2011

In 2014, Ravikant co-founded MetaStable Capital, a cryptocurrency hedge fund. A June 2017 regulatory filing reported the fund's assets as $69 million, with investors including Andreessen Horowitz and Sequoia Capital.

In 2017, Ravikant launched Spearhead, an investment fund that provides capital to founders to enable them to invest in technology startups as angel investors. The fund's third cohort raised $100 million for 15 founders. Companies backed by Spearhead founders include Neuralink, Opendoor, and Rippling.

Ravikant hosts a podcast, Nav.al, where he discusses topics including philosophy and investing. He has also been a guest on podcasts such as The Joe Rogan Experience and The Tim Ferriss Show.

With Ravikant's permission, Eric Jorgenson curated his tweets, essays, and interviews into a book titled The Almanack of Naval Ravikant: A Guide to Wealth and Happiness.

In 2023, Ravikant co-founded Airchat, a social media application that uses voice notes and AI-powered transcription.

In 2026, Forbes named Ravikant to its "Self-Made 250" list.
