= CarComplaints.com =

Automotive complaint website

Autobeef, LLC

- CarComplaints vehicle complaint page
- Company type: Privately held
- Available in: English
- Headquarters: South Hero, Vermont, United States
- Area served: Worldwide
- Founder: Michael Wickenden
- Industry: Internet
- Services: Automotive Complaint Information
- Employees: 10
- Website: www.carcomplaints.com
- Advertising: Banner ads, referral marketing
- Registration: Optional
- Launched: June 27, 2000; 26 years ago
- Current status: Active

CarComplaints.com is an online automotive complaint resource that uses graphs to show automotive defect patterns, based on complaint data submitted by visitors to the site. The complaints are organized into logical groups with data published by vehicle, vehicle component, and specific problem. The average cost to fix, average mileage at failure, common solutions and individual owner comments are shown for each problem group. There is no charge or user signup required to access the complaint data, although user registration is required in order to submit a car complaint.

== Rating System ==
Vehicles are rated on a system of four badges, which are given based on nominations by owners of certain vehicles or generations of vehicles. From highest-rated to lowest-rated, the badges are:

- Seal of Awesome – no apparent defects.
- Seal of Pretty Good – May have minor defects, but nothing too serious or expensive.
- Beware Of The Clunker – serious defects, but doesn't deserve the "Avoid Like The Plague" rating since the defects either occur at high mileage, aren't too costly to repair, or aren't widespread.
- Avoid Like The Plague – serious and widespread defects that occur at relatively low mileage, are very expensive to repair, and may pose a safety risk.

=== Worst vehicles ===
CarComplaints.com has a 'Worst Vehicles' list, where they rank vehicles using their PainRank algorithm to show what the worst vehicles are. The 2002 Ford Explorer is ranked as the "Worst Vehicle on Record", largely due to widespread transmission failure at under 100,000 miles of drive time. The #2, #3, and #4 ranking on CarComplaints.com's worst vehicles are the 2003 Honda Accord, 2019 Toyota RAV4, and 2013 Nissan Altima respectively, with all three models also suffering from widespread transmission problems.

== Recognition ==
CarComplaints.com was featured in a December 2014 Lifehacker article, Five Best Car Comparison Sites, and also mentioned in several New York Times articles from 2013 to 2015: Ford Windstar Minivans Recalled for a Second Time, Chrysler Owners Sound Off on a Power Defect and Ram Dashboards Cracking.

CarComplaints.com was recommended in a June 2010 report from the Consumer Federation of America titled Consumer Complaint Websites: An Assessment. The CFA's report compared six generic complaint websites but singled out CarComplaints.com as a specialized resource for "consumers interested in automobiles, who should begin with carcomplaints.com." The CFA's recommendation of CarComplaints.com was repeated in media coverage by The New York Times, MSNBC, The Early Show & other news outlets.

CarComplaints.com was also named a "Top 100 Website of 2009" by PC Magazine.

== See also ==
- Consumer Reports
- TrueDelta
- Epinions
