= Vflyer =

vFlyer, Inc.
- Company type: Private
- Available in: English
- Founded: San Francisco, California
- Headquarters: San Francisco, California
- Key people: Aaron Sperling, CEO; Oliver Muoto, VP Marketing
- Services: software applications
- Website: www.vFlyer.com
- Current status: active

vFlyer, Inc., operator of the vFlyer.com website, is a Web 2.0 company founded by Aaron Sperling and Oliver Muoto in 2004 and is based in San Francisco, California. The company enables online sellers and sales professionals (realtors, auto dealers, service providers, etc.) to syndicate and distribute their product or service listings to online marketplaces that include Oodle, Vast.com, Google Base, Trulia, Craigslist, HotPads.com, Yahoo! Classifieds, eBay Classifieds, and others.

== History ==
vFlyer was begun as a project in 2004 by Application Park co-founder Aaron Sperling and Epicentric co-founder Oliver Muoto to allow online sellers to syndicate listings to online classified ad sites. The company launched on October 2, 2006, and was featured in a New York Times article.

The company has been self-funded by its two founders and has made significant inroads in the real estate community. The company was named the Most Innovative Web Service by Inman News in 2007.
