= MusicOMH =

British online music magazine

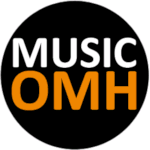
- Categories: Online magazine; music website
- Founded: 1999
- Country: England
- Website: musicomh.com
- ISSN: 2516-6220
- MusicOMH
- Key people: Michael Hubbard; Steven Johnson; Melanie Eskenazi
- Launched: 15 December 1999

MusicOMH (stylised as musicOMH) is a London-based online music magazine which publishes independent reviews, features and interviews from across all genres including classical, metal, rock and R&B.

== History ==
MusicOMH was founded and launched by Editor in Chief Michael Hubbard in 1999. In February 2011, the site's former theatre section was spun off, becoming Exeunt Magazine, as MusicOMH refocused from being a general arts publication to writing primarily about music.

== Main features and coverage ==
MusicOMH's music content consists of reviews of albums, gigs, tracks and festivals, alongside features, interviews and blog posts. The site also provides live reviews and other features. The site's album reviews, usually covering a wide range of genres including pop, electro, classical, metal, rock and R&B, have been quoted by numerous publications such as The Daily Telegraph, The Independent and the BBC. The site has also been used as one of many sources to accumulate aggregated review scores for Metacritic.

Over the course of 25 years, the site has also conducted interviews with artists, ranging from house music duo Basement Jaxx, via Swedish band Miike Snow to rapper Jay-Z. In September 2009, publications such as Contactmusic.com, AOL and Yahoo! Music used the interview with Jay-Z to spread word of his will to work with other notable musicians such as Jack White and Bono.

== Awards and nominations ==
The Independent described MusicOMH as "Brit-centric, accessible and unpretentious", in their list of the 25 best music websites in October 2009. The site was nominated for Best Digital Publication at the 2009, 2010 and 2011 Record of the Day Awards.

== See also ==
- Review site
- Consequence
- Drowned in Sound
- The Line of Best Fit
- Epinions
