= Levels of edit =

Categorization scheme for text revising

Levels of edit (or levels of editing) describes a cumulative or categorical scheme for revising text. Beginning as a tool to standardize communication between writers and editors at a government laboratory, the levels of edit has been adopted and modified by the general public and academics in professional communication and technical communication.

== History ==
In 1978, the Jet Propulsion Laboratory (JPL) at the California Institute of Technology found a need to clearly "define the endeavor of technical editing" in their in-house documents and external reports. Robert Van Buren and Mary Fran Buehler, of the JPL, developed five levels of edit defined by nine editorial categories:

1. Coordination: Consider version and circulation, Consider the review cycles
2. Policy: Consider the organizational structure
3. Integrity: Are sources noted?
4. Screening: Consider spelling. Are visuals/art presented with clarity?
5. Copy clarification: Are images legible? Are images trimmed?
6. Format: What are the layout conventions? What are the typographical conventions?
7. Mechanical style: Check spelling and usage.
8. Language: Make edits for clarity and concision.
9. Substantive

Level 1 includes all of the above categories, while Level 5 includes only Policy and Coordination.

In 1976, JPL first published Van Buren and Buehler's work as The Levels of Edit. JPL published a second edition in 1980, which was distributed to the public by the United States Government Printing Office (GPO). After the GPO's supply of the second edition was depleted, the Society for Technical Communication (STC) made an exact reprint of the second edition available.

Drawing on Van Buren and Buehler's work, in 1985 the writing and editing group at the Los Alamos National Laboratory established four levels of edit for technical reports. A team at the laboratory revised the work following a 1994 survey that indicated the original four levels no longer met authors’ needs. The Los Alamos revision presented three “author-based” levels of edit (proofreading edit, grammar edit, and full edit) whose goals were to “simplify the editing process, focus editing on improving technical clarity, and ensure that value was added in editing.”

For students learning technical communication, Carolyn D. Rude reduced the levels of edit to just two types: 1) comprehensive editing and 2) copy editing. Comprehensive editing encompasses "the full range of document qualities, including content, organization, and design as well as grammar and punctuation, with the goal of making a document more usable, suitable for its purpose and readers, and comprehension," while copy editing involves editing grammar, formatting, and sentence structure.

Several chapters in New Perspectives on Technical Editing, edited by Avon J. Murphy, include discussions of the different types of edits.

Other researchers have built schemes and workflows based on traditional editing rules, tasks, and analyses. For example, Tarutz defined a hierarchy of levels that Corbin and Oestreich referred to in their presentation at the 2011 STC Summit as “informal,” which are:

1. Turning pages (a superficial look of the text).
2. Skimming (correcting obvious errors of spelling, grammar, and punctuation).
3. Skimming and comparing (seeking internal consistency, including cross-references).
4. Reading (improving writing style, such as wording and usage).
5. Analyzing (identifying and fixing organizational flaws, missing information, redundancy, and technical inconsistency).
6. Testing and using (fixing technical errors and resolving usability problems).

To bring a quality assurance perspective to technical editing, Corbin and others mapped types of edit to types of testing, for example, “system testing to comprehensive editing” and “function testing to copyediting” (p. 290). This is closely related to usability testing in usability studies and user experience (UX), where developers test how users interact with interfaces and content. Usability testing has been used to guide edits since early use at IBM in 1985.

== Other variations ==
As web-based on-demand proofreading and editing services have become increasingly available, the number of edit levels and editing schemes has increased in variety. For example, three cumulative levels is a common scheme, typically 1) light, 2) medium, and 3) heavy editing. Another three-level scheme appears frequently across websites: 1) proofreading, 2) light, and 3) heavy editing. Four levels usually differs from a three-level scheme only by the inclusion of a mid-range level, such as 1) basic proofreading and 2) light, 3) medium, and 4) heavy editing. No matter the scheme, a level of edit defined as heavy often results in a complete rewrite. Here is one example of a web-based service that offers six levels of edit according to a partially cumulative scheme:

1. Basic proofreading
2. Complete editing without comments
3. Complete editing with comments
4. Manuscript critique
5. Formatting and layout
6. Verification of citation sources.

Based on the function of the edit and the working unit to which it applies, eight levels of edit are also presented, as follows.

1. Developmental outline: Technical document
2. Technical: Document
3. Style: Document
4. Literary: Paragraph
5. Copy: Sentence
6. Format: Character
7. Production: Character
8. Review: Document

The levels of edit have also been used by the general public to contribute to online conversation and discourse. Volunteer editors on Wiki platforms like Wikipedia often use levels of edit to ensure a consistent style for different articles. Epinions advisors often suggest edits on the comprehensive level to improve site reviews, showing a real implementation of the practice.

== See also ==
- Edits
- Editing
- Information design

== Other references ==
Coggin, W. O. and L. R. Porter. 1992. Editing for the Technical Professions. Boston: Allyn & Bacon.

Masse, R. E. 2003. “Theory and Practice of Editing Processes in Technical Communication,” (247-255). D. F. Beer (2nd ed.). Writing and Speaking in the Technology Professions: A Practical Guide. Hoboken, NJ: John Wiley. Reprinted from IEEE Transactions on Professional Communication, (PC-28), no. 1, 34–2, March 1985.

Samson, D. C. Jr. 1993. Editing Technical Writing. New York: Oxford University.
