= StoryServer =

- Original author: CNET (originally PRISM)
- Developer: Vignette
- Stable release: V5, V6
- Operating system: cross-platform
- Available in: Tcl, Java, ASP
- Type: Web publishing

StoryServer was the name the company Vignette gave to CNET's web publishing application "PRISM" when they bought it. It used a document publishing model to move templates through various workflow stages, and was thus quite useful to the newly formed Web publishing world.

The templates were defined in the Tcl language, using extensions that made StoryServer's internal state and database available.

The defining attribute of StoryServer was the caching system which allowed access to pre-generated pages to completely bypass the content generation system, and thus produce these pages as fast as the underlying hardware and Web server software could send them to the network. This gained StoryServer a degree of scalability that most products were incapable of matching. It integrated with HTTP web server platforms and used lazy caching gracefully connected to their 404 "File Not Found" handlers.

StoryServer version 4 was released in July 1998 and introduced XML support. After StoryServer 4, Vignette changed the name of the product to "V5", and has named each subsequent version in the same manner. V5 and V6 added support for templates that used Java and ASP rather than tcl.

StoryServer-based websites often use a distinctive page address style in which the filename consists of several numbers separated by commas. An example URL of this form would be 'http://example.com/foo/0,1245,,00.html'.

== See also ==
- Information and Content Exchange
- Vignette Corporation
