= Grafomap =

Company based in Riga, Latvia

- Company type: Private
- Industry: Design
- Founded: 2016
- Founders: Rihards Piks and Karlis Bikis
- Headquarters: Riga, Latvia
- Area served: Global
- Key people: Janis Lazda Lazdins, Rudolfs Janitis
- Website: grafomap.com

Grafomap is a Latvia-based design company that combines OpenStreetMap data with design filters, allowing people to create map posters of places in the world.

== History ==
The company and its team are located in Latvia, while the posters and maps are printed and shipped from Los Angeles and Riga. Grafomap was founded in 2016 by Rihards Piks and Karlis Bikis.

According to co-founder Rihards Piks, the start-up is inspired by Snazzy Maps. It is a WordPress plugin that colors maps for website contact pages. The idea transformed into creating custom maps in real-time for people who would like to use maps as wall posters.

The start-up has been featured in numerous fashion, art and business outlets like The Guardian, Chicago Tribune, Launching Next, The Coolector, Simply Grove, PSFK and Product Hunt.
