= Yayzy =

Climate Fintech Startup

- Company type: Private limited company
- Industry: FinTech, CleanTech
- Founded: October 21, 2019; 6 years ago in London, England
- Founder: Mankaran Ahluwalia, (CEO); Cristian Dan, (CTO); Pedro Cabrero Nassar, (CFO)
- Headquarters: London, England
- Products: CO_{2} Purchase Analysis as B2B API, iOS and Android Mobile apps for B2C
- Website: yayzy.com

Yayzy is a London-based software company which developed and operates an application for estimating personal carbon emissions, based on a consumer's behaviour, including purchases and environmental work. It also provides this technology to banks and fintechs, as an application programming interface, to offer CO_{2} tracking, calculation, reduction and offsetting to their customers. The company uses machine learning and big data analysis to assess purchases and provide users with carbon emissions data associated with their purchases.

== History ==
Yayzy was founded in London in 2019 in the Antler Startup accelerator and graduated in 2020 receiving funding. It then released Yayzy Footprint Calculator on iOS and Android, which was featured in the AppStore. In November 2020, Yayzy announced a partnership with EcoSphere+ to sell the carbon offsets provided by EcoSphere+ in Yayzy's mobile app.

The company announced in August 2022 that they had expanded their bank support in order to connect bank accounts in 30 countries including the European Union, the United States and Canada.

== Products & services ==
=== Mobile App ===
Yayzy's principal product is a mobile app that attempts to calculate the environmental impact of a user's spending by connecting to their bank account's purchases, using the Open banking standard. It also provides users with suggestions for more environmentally friendly alternative merchants, as well as greener personal behaviours and more effective means of mitigating their carbon footprint with carbon offsetting project investments.

=== B2B API ===
The company offers B2B API software to help financial institutions such as big banks, integrate carbon footprint calculations and the purchasing of offsets into their proprietary apps and web platforms. This API allows banks and fintechs to provide their customers with individualised carbon emissions metrics associated with their purchases, and buy offsets to mitigate their carbon footprint. IBM has partnered with Yayzy, hosting the API cloud infrastructure and selling the API to IBM's financial sector customers.

== Fundraising ==
Yayzy was funded by Antler VC in a pre-seed round announced in November 2019. It secured another seed round in 2020 from Teal Impact VC and Pario Ventures, as well as a crowdfunding campaign with 1002 investors.

== Awards and recognition ==
Yayzy also won several awards (PwC Future50, Digital Top50, SET100, Product Hunt's Golden Kitty Awards #3, P.E.A Awards, World Festival Innovation Awards) and was featured in January 2021 by Apple as "App of the Day" in AppStore, by BBC TV in November 2021 and by UK Government in their Net Zero Innovation Handbook in August 2022.
