= DataSage =

Defunct American software company

DataSage, Inc.
- Type: Privately held
- Industry: Software
- Founded: 1997, Sigma Prime Ventures, Flagship Ventures
- Defunct: 2000
- Fate: Acquired
- Successor: Vignette Corporation
- Headquarters: Reading, Massachusetts (registered)
- Key people: David Blundin (Chief Executive Officer)
- Products: Data mining, personalization, clickstream, and forecasting
- Number of employees: c. 120 (2000)

DataSage, Inc. was an American company headquartered in Reading, Massachusetts, that offered a suite of data mining, personalization, clickstream, and forecasting software. Founded in 1997, DataSage was bought by Vignette Corporation in 2000.

Targeted at the enterprise market, DataSage was a provider of e-marketing and personalization applications. Many large customers ran DataSage’s Data Mining Manager product, including Amazon.com, Staples, Bradlees, Sears, Outpost.com and My-Meals.com.

== History ==
In 1994 David Blundin started Cirrus Recognition Systems with the goal of leveraging innovative pattern recognition software developed by David at MIT as part of his work in the MIT AI Lab. The initial application was Optical Character Recognition, and the new technology made the OCR process faster and more reliable. The original sale for the company came in the form of a $300K licensing agreement with Scan-Optics, a manufacturer of document scanners. This initial success was rallied into new market opportunities, recognizing that the advanced technology had applications in other fields, including the growing field of data mining and forecasting.

In 1997, recognizing that the enterprise data mining market was a much larger opportunity than OCR, the original Cirrus Recognition Systems team formed a new company, DataSage, and began to tackle the Enterprise Data Mining market. DataSage’s initial success in inventory forecasting in the grocery business turned into a significant relationship with Walmart, providing perishable inventory forecasting solutions in Walmart’s emerging supermarket offering. During this same time period, the e-commerce market was heating up, and DataSage recognized the opportunity to enhance the product offering to support the needs of advanced e-commerce providers looking to provide personalized content based on the user’s clickstream behavior.

In 1999, DataSage launched a new set of product features specifically designed to be used in the website content personalization market, which included early collaboration with Amazon.com. This early market success in e-commerce personalization caught the eye of several major e-commerce providers that were each looking to integrate and provide these advanced capabilities with their platforms.

On January 7, 2000, a reverse triangular merger agreement was signed by both DataSage and Vignette. On January 10, 2000 Vignette Corporation announced its intention to acquire DataSage for 3.16 million shares plus assumption of the company's stock option plan and compensation plans for key employees amounting to 250,000 shares, with a target closing date of no later than March 31, 2000. The acquisition was completed and announced on February 15, 2000. Using the average closing price of Vignette’s stock over the 15 trading days following the close of the transaction (adjusted for inflation from 2000 to 2015) yields a 2015 inflation-adjusted valuation of over $1 billion. As a result, DataSage was a Unicorn (finance) 13 years before Cowboys Ventures founder Aileen Lee coined the term for private companies that reach a valuation of $1 billion or more.

== See also ==
- Data Mining
- Content Management Systems
- Vignette Corporation
