= PriceSCAN =

PriceSCAN.com was a US-based price comparison website, founded in 1997 by David Cost and Jeffrey Trester, alumni of the Wharton School. A privately held company based in Malvern, Pennsylvania, PriceSCAN was one of the first generation of "shopping bots" which included Dealtime, mySimon and BottomDollar.

== History ==
From the outset PriceSCAN attempted to distinguish itself as serious instrument which consumers could use to achieve price transparency. Economists theorized that the internet, then in its infancy, might provide consumers with an unprecedented opportunity to see through the screen of retail prices to a seller's underlying cost. They could then use this information to judge whether the two are reasonably in line. "They can log on to price-comparison sites like PriceSCAN.com . . . to readily compare the prices and features . . . And every time a customer takes advantage of a cheaper price from an on-line discounter . . . she unlearns her long-held rules of thumb about how price and cost are related for the product she just purchased."

To this end, PriceSCAN set itself up as an "unbiased" price comparison engine. The website's FAQ stated "At PriceSCAN, we believe that consumers should have access to unbiased reporting on products and prices. It seems obvious to us that if a price guide restricts its listings to those vendors who have paid to be included, then its database more accurately reflects the source of its revenue, not necessarily the best products at the lowest price."

PriceSCAN has been both criticized and praised for this strategy; criticized for the potential loss of advertising revenue ("But PriceScan won't accept payment from merchants for a higher ranking in the search results. In fact, PriceScan plays up its policy of not doing that.") and praised for the integrity of the strategy itself ("'They've always had more purity in search results,' says [Rob Leathern of Jupiter Media Metrix]. 'They have a very consumer-friendly offer.'")

Since April 2011, the comparison service has been inactive; the company's Web page now reads simply "PriceSCAN.com, Inc. is a consumer and financial data technology company."

== See also ==
- Price Comparison Service
