= Typeeto =

Software tool for iOS and Android devices

- Developer: Eltima Software
- Initial release: 25 June 2015; 10 years ago
- Operating system: OS X 10.9.5 and ahead
- Platform: Macintosh
- Size: 3.2 MB
- Available in: English, French, German, Spanish
- License: Commercial proprietary software
- Website: mac.eltima.com/bluetooth-keyboard.html

Typeeto is a software that allows users to use a Bluetooth-compatible Macintosh keyboard with a range of different devices, including iOS and Android smartphones and tablets, Apple TV, game consoles, Windows PCs, iPad, iPhone, iPod Touch, and MacBooks. The tool allows the keyboard to connect to multiple devices simultaneously, and users can switch between them using a designated hotkey.

== Overview ==
Typeeto received recognition for its versatility and functionality when it was featured on Product Hunt and received generally positive responses from the community.
