= AngelList =

Website connecting startups, angel investors, and job-seekers

- AngelList's logo
- Website type: Entrepreneurship, Startups, Investments
- Available in: English
- No. of locations: 3
- Owners: Venture Hacks, Inc.
- Founders: Naval Ravikant and Babak Nivi
- CEO: Avlok Kohli
- Subsidiaries: Product Hunt, CoinList, Wellfound, Belltower Fund
- Website: angellist.com
- Commercial: Yes
- Launched: April 22, 2010; 16 years ago in San Francisco, CA

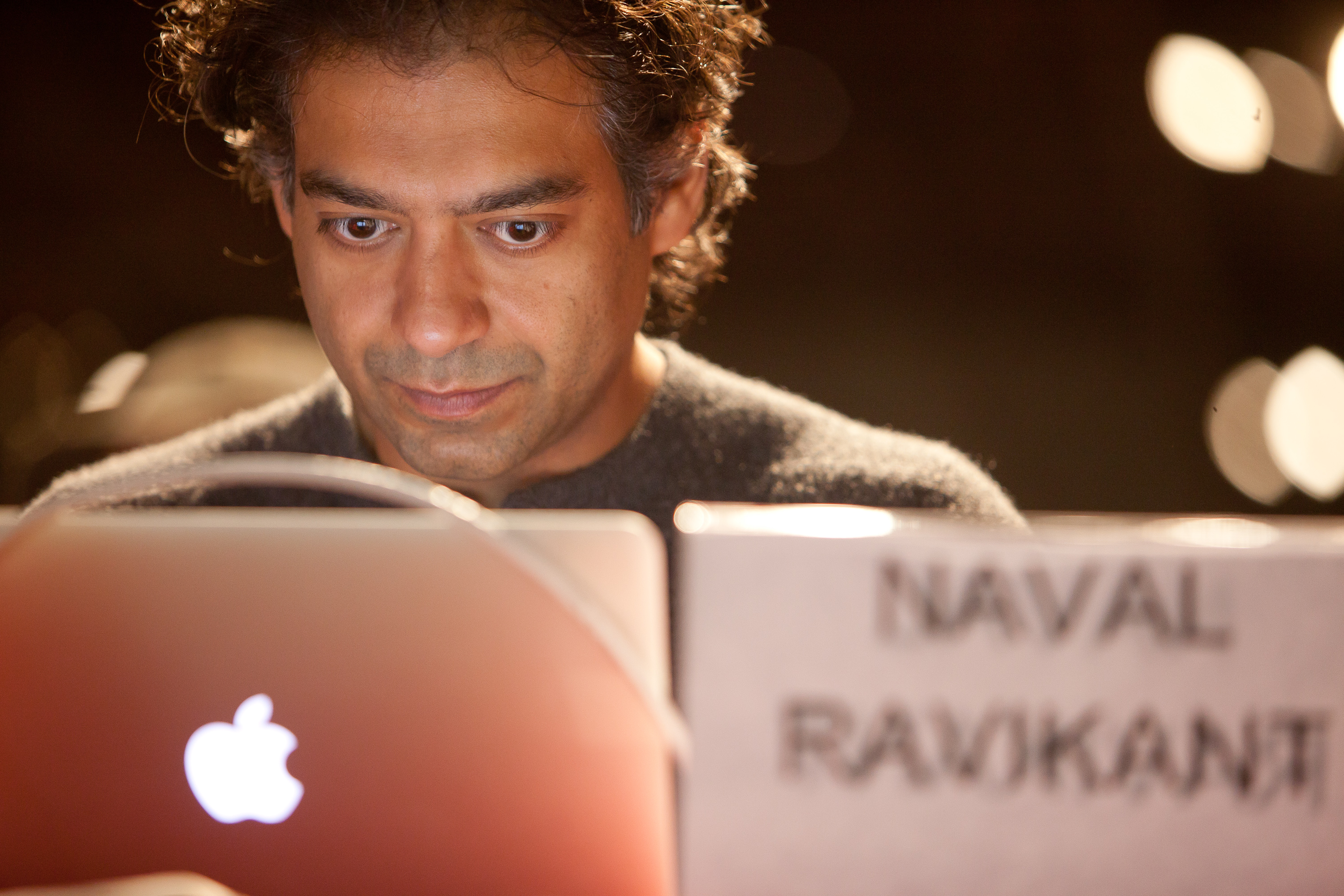
AngelList co-founder, Naval Ravikant

AngelList is an American software company for fundraising and connecting startups, angel investors, and limited partners. Founded in 2010, it started as an online introduction board for tech startups that needed seed funding. Since 2015, the site allows startups to raise money from angel investors free of charge. Created by serial entrepreneur Naval Ravikant and Babak Nivi in 2010, Avlok Kohli has been leading AngelList as its CEO since 2019.

== History ==
AngelList was founded in 2010 by serial entrepreneur Naval Ravikant and Babak Nivi. Using the traction from the Venture Hack blog on entrepreneur financing, Naval and Babak started a list of 25 investors with whom they would share interesting companies to invest in. They announced the list as "AngelList" in 2010, with the subscription of 50 angel investors who intended to invest US$80 million that year.

== Mission and operations ==
Business Insider dubbed AngelList the "Match.com for investors and startups". In a 2017 interview, Naval Ravikant said he wants more "innovation on [the] infrastructure for innovation itself" by helping startups with money, talent, and customers.

AngelList's Syndicate facilitates startup financing with accredited investors. AngelList Jobs, later rebranded as Wellfound, connects talent with startups, with over 35,000 recruiting companies, more than 2,000,000 candidates and 5 million registered users. AngelList's acquisition of Product Hunt will allow more support for startups with customer generation and product launch. AngelList Syndicates allow startups to raise money from accredited investors investing alongside prominent angel investors.

== History ==
AngelList launched Jobs – its recruiting portal – in 2012.

In late 2012, AngelList launched a portal for accelerators and incubators to accept and manage applications from startups to their programs. At opening, AngelList accepted applications for 500 Startups, TechStars Boston, and AngelPad. Other accelerators, like Rock Health, accept applications exclusively through AngelList.

In 2013, AngelList received a no-action letter from the SEC, allowing the operations of its Syndicates platform. FundersClub also received such a letter in the same period. AngelList Syndicates was noted as one of the most important innovations in the venture capital and angel investment industries, getting momentum with several well-known figures in the tech community creating syndicates, including Jason Calacanis, Scott Banister, Tim Ferriss, Gil Penchina, Scott and Cyan Banister, Fabrice Grinda, Elad Gil and more. In 2017, AngelList had 4,400 investors operating across 165 syndicates.

In March 2014, AngelList launched Maiden Lane, a first online venture fund for investing in syndicated deals. It was launched with more than $25 million in funding from a variety of investors. In 2014, women represented only 7.4% of all AngelList investors.

In October 2015, AngelList announced a deal with a Chinese third-largest private equity firm CSC (China Science & Merchants Investment Management Group) for establishing a new $400 million fund for early-stage startup investments. According to The Wall Street Journal, the deal became the "largest single pool of funds devoted to early-stage startups — ever," and also the "largest-ever single investment by a Chinese private-equity firm in a U.S. fund."

Prior to the deal, the Wall Street Journal said AngelList "had raised $205 million from all sources, including $43 million from institutional investors."

In July 2016, AngelList launched Republic - a spinoff addressing the democratization of startup equity crowdfunding with non-accredited investors.

In November 2016, AngelList acquired Product Hunt for $20 million. Naval Ravikant planned to use Product Hunt to further "[help] companies find their early customers."

In October 2017, CoinList – initial coin offering services for startups and accredited investors – spun off from AngelList. At the end of 2017 AngelList had profiles of over 70,000 startups.

In early 2018, AngelList expanded its Syndicates program to India.

In 2019, AngelList started offering infrastructure for fund management within the private equity industry.

In 2020, AngelList launched rolling funds, an investment vehicle that raises money through a quarterly subscription from interested investors. In the same year, AngelList India's CEO, Utsav Somani, launched a $5 million micro-fund, iSeed SEA, to invest in startups located in Southeast Asia.

In 2021, AngelList raised $25 million for the AngelList Early Stage Quant Fund, an investment vehicle which plans to invest $250,000 in over 100 companies.

In March 2022, AngelList closed its $100 million Series B led by Tiger Global. One month later, the company raised another bridge round of $44 million.

In November 2022, AngelList Talent was spun out as a separate company and rebranded as Wellfound.

In June 2023, AngelList announced its acquisition of Nova, an investor management software for institutional private funds. The purchase supported CEO Avlok Kohli's initiative to expand AngelList's customer base to include private equity.

== Involvement in the JOBS Act ==
In mid-2012, Naval Ravikant and Kevin Laws, AngelList's chief operating officer, were active in Washington in his support for the Jumpstart Our Business Startups Act (JOBS Act), a law that eased many of the United States' securities regulations with the aim of making it easier for companies to either go public or to remain private longer while continuing to raise capital. He was in discussion with "Senate and Congressional staffers, Steve Case, and influential Congressmen who would listen." During the same period, he organized an online petition that attracted 5,000 signatures on a letter to Senate leaders in support of the Act. Later in 2013, Naval Ravikant wrote a letter to the SEC to object to changes in the JOBS Act that he believed "could create disastrous unintended consequences for the startup community."
