= TrueDelta =

Car information site

TrueDelta.com
- Website type: review site
- Creator: Dr. Michael Karesh
- Website: www.truedelta.com
- Launched: September 2004
- Current status: Active

TrueDelta.com is a car information site that claims over 106100 registered members as of June 2019 and more than 130,000 registered cars. The site focuses on the reporting of automobile reliability and gas mileage, and also contains vehicle pricing and comparison information. The site utilizes its membership base to gather data and report on each registered/owned vehicle monthly with data published quarterly.

== Reliability Data ==
The site collects and utilizes 'real-world' repair rates from regular survey data supplied by its user base. The site is one of a few services to utilize statistical analysis to report this data. The site then updates the results quarterly. With this frequency, information on new models will be at most 3 months old, making it possible for these models to be closely tracked as they age

== Fuel Economy ==
TrueDelta.com tracks and reports car model fuel efficiency. Truedelta.com collects additional information relating to gas mileage such as how, where, and when a car is driven. It also collects relevant geographical data such as how hilly the terrain is, and what the driving conditions are (i.e. stop-and-go city, suburb, highway), also collecting information such as air conditioner use.

== History and Method ==
TrueDelta.com was developed in 2004 by Dr. Michael Karesh, a contributor to the automotive site The Truth About Cars. For his PhD Thesis, Karesh studied within General Motors for a year and half, researching how well they understood consumers when developing new products. For his Masters thesis, Karesh did work with early research in consumer behavior. Additionally Karesh has written and published much on cars. He has been a contributor to the car review site The Truth About Cars, and was one of the category leads for the Epinions.com auto section before Epinions shut down volunteer contributed reviews.

TrueDelta's data collection methodology differs from other publications such as Consumer Reports. Consumer Reports compiles data from reader surveys once annually while Truedelta.com sends users quarterly survey emails. TrueDelta also differs in that it asks if a vehicle needed unscheduled service, how many days the vehicle was in the shop, and whether the problem was corrected.

== Limitations ==
Given its relatively small sample size, Truedelta.com has been accused of having a more limited selection of model data compared to Consumer Reports. Truedelta also allows for a smaller reportable base per model (25), compared to Consumer Reports (100).

== See also ==
- The Truth About Cars
- Consumer Reports
- Review Site
- Epinions.com
- Consumer/Market Research
- Fuel Economy in Automobiles
