= Nahum Sharfman =

Israeli entrepreneur

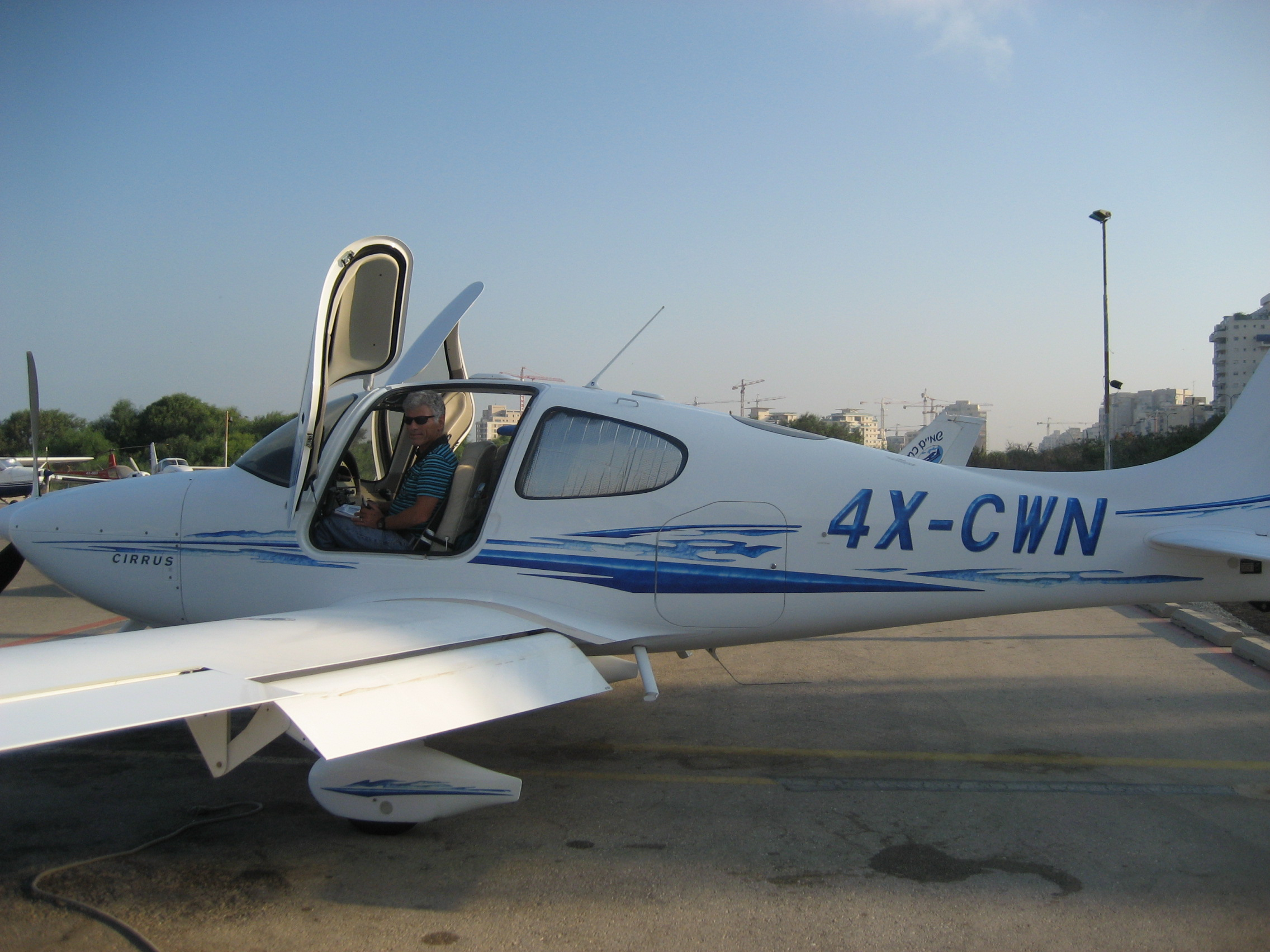
Nahum Sharfman with his Cirrus SR22

Nahum Sharfman (Hebrew: נחום שרפמן) was an Israeli tech entrepreneur who, along with Amir Ashkenazi, founded Shopping.com. Shopping.com was later acquired by eBay for $650 million. He was also the Chairman of social content sharing site eSnips Ltd.

Prior to shopping.com, Sharfman co-founded the IT security company Commtouch for which he served as the Chairman of the Board from its inception in February 1991 to November 1997. Commtouch IPO'ed in 2000.

Prior to starting his own ventures, Sharfman spent 11 years working for National Semiconductor. He received a Ph.D. in High Energy Nuclear Physics from Carnegie Mellon University and M.S. and B.S. degrees in Physics from the Technion, the Israel Institute of Technology.

Sharfman and his wife, Nava, died in a plane crash on the Mount Ainos in the Ioanian island of Cephallonia, Greece while en route to Corfu on April 29, 2009.
