= Ed Anuff =

Technology entrepreneur

- Occupations: Entrepreneur; Head of Product at DataStax
- Website: http://www.anuff.com

Ed Anuff is an entrepreneur and VP of Open Platform Strategy, Data and AI at IBM. Prior to IBM, he was CPO at DataStax and former Vice President of Product Strategy at Apigee. He is the founder of cloud based service Usergrid. Prior to Usergrid, he served as Executive Vice President and GM, Platform Products and Services at Six Apart, Ltd.

== Career ==
Prior to joining DataStax, Anuff founded cloud service Usergrid. Apigee acquired Usergrid in January 2012. Prior to Usergrid, he served as Executive Vice President and GM, Platform Products and Services at Six Apart, Ltd.

Before joining Six Apart Anuff was co-founder of Widgetbox (with Giles Goodwin and Dean Moses), a marketplace for widgets. He was the company's original CEO. Prior to founding Widgetbox, Anuff was co-founder of enterprise software company Epicentric (with Oliver Muoto), a leading provider of Enterprise portal software. He served as Epicentric's first CEO, later assuming the roles of chairman and chief strategy officer.

Prior to co-founding Epicentric, he was an executive at Wired (parent of Wired.com) responsible for the launch of HotBot, one of the first news search engines, in May 1996.

Anuff is a graduate of Rensselaer Polytechnic Institute (RPI) and author of the best selling Java Sourcebook, published by John Wiley & Sons, one of the first books on the Java programming language.

== Patents ==
In 2001, Anuff was also granted a key patent (US Patent # 6,327,628) related to portal server software.

In 2010, Anuff and eight coworkers were granted US Patent # 7,801,990, "Graphical user interface for performing administration on web components of web sites in a portal framework".

== Books ==
- Java Sourcebook
