= Widgetbox =

American company

- Type: Privately held companies
- Founded: 2006
- Defunct: March 28, 2014
- Fate: rebranded; original service shut down
- Successor: Flite
- Headquarters: San Francisco, United States
- Website: widgetbox.com

Widgetbox was a San Francisco, California based company that enabled businesses to create and deliver applications to their customers. Widgetbox formally discontinued their service on March 28, 2014.

In February 2011, Widgetbox rebranded as Flite and focused on online and mobile advertising.

== Products ==
Widgetbox products included:

=== Widgetbox Mobile ===
Enabled the user to build and distribute mobile web applications for iPhone and Android.

=== ClickTurn Real-time Rich Media Ads ===
The user could develop and run rich-media ads.

=== Widgets ===
Enable the user to aggregate content into a web widget.

== History ==
Widgetbox was founded in 2006 by Ed Anuff, Giles Goodwin and Dean Moses. The company debuted the same year at DEMOfall 2006. Sequoia Capital and Hummer Winblad Venture Partners invested an undisclosed amount in the company in 2007.

A Series B round of funding was announced in January 2008, by Northgate Capital, Sequoia Capital, Hummer Winblad Venture Partners, independent investor Michael Dearing, et al.

== Recent updates ==
- August 2007: Announced a distribution partnership with iTunes that allows users to create and publish widgets based on an iMix playlist.
- September 2007: Launched an App Accelerator for Facebook, which enabled users to create a Facebook application based on one of their widgets.
- November 2007: Announced support for Google's OpenSocial initiative. Added support for importing Google Gadgets.
- December 2007: Participated in the launch of the Bebo Open Application Platform.
- January 2008: released an App Accelerator for Bebo. Announced it raised an additional $8m in Series B funding.
- March 2008: Will Price, a General Partner at Hummer Winblad Venture Partners, becomes new CEO.
- October 2008: Partnered with Yardbarker.
- July 2009: Partnered with Blogger to allow people to turn their Blogger blog into a widget.
- March 2011: Widgetbox renamed to Flite.
- November 2013: Announced they were shutting down on 28 March 2014.
- March 28, 2014: Shut down.
