= Epicentric =

American enterprise software company

Epicentric, Inc.
- Company type: Private
- Available in: English
- Founded: San Francisco, California
- Headquarters: San Francisco, California
- Owner: Vignette Corporation
- Key people: Michael Crosno, CEO; Ed Anuff, CTO; Oliver Muoto, Co-founder; Kathleen Hayes, VP Marketing, Charlotte Goldsberry VP Sales
- Services: Enterprise software
- Website: www.epicentric.com
- Current status: Acquired

Epicentric, Inc., was an enterprise software company and a provider of enterprise portal solutions for Global 2000 companies. Made popular by custom portal sites like My Yahoo!, enterprise portals enabled businesses (primarily enterprise companies) to deliver integrated Web services to their customers (Internet), partners (Extranet) and employees (Intranet). The company was founded in 1998 by Wired.com executive Ed Anuff and TouchWave executive Oliver Muoto, both startup veterans, in San Francisco, California. The company had over 300 employees and 350 Global 2000 customers before it was acquired by Vignette (VIGN) in December 2002.

== History ==
The company was founded by Ed Anuff and Oliver Muoto in 1998. The company received Series A funding from Outlook Ventures, New Vista Capital and Innovacom Ventures (investment arm of France Telecom).

== Products ==
- Epicentric Foundation Server
- Epicentric Application Builder
- Epicentric Module Marketplace

== Investors ==
Investors included JP Morgan, Outlook Ventures, New Vista Capital, Motorola, and others.

== Competitors ==
Competitors include Plumtree Software (now BEA Systems), IBM, and Oracle Corporation.

== Acquisitions ==
Epicentric acquired Application Park, a web-services tools company, in 2001. In December 2002, Epicentric was acquired by Austin, Texas–based Vignette Corp.
