= Ramanathan V. Guha =

Indian computer scientist

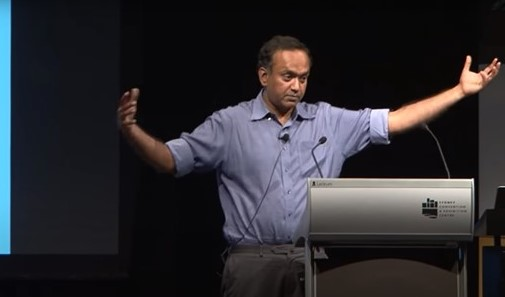
- Ramanathan V. Guha (2013)
- Citizenship: India
- Education: Indian Institute of Technology Madras; University of California, Berkeley; Stanford University
- Known for: Cyc; Schema.org; Meta Content Framework; Resource Description Framework; RSS; Datacommons.org
- Scientific career
- Fields: Data mining
- Workplaces: Microsoft; OpenAI; Google; IBM; Apple Inc. Indian Institute of Technology Madras; University of California Berkeley; Stanford University
- Thesis: Contexts: A formalization and some applications (1992)
- Doctoral advisor: John McCarthy; Edward Feigenbaum
- Website: www.guha.com/cv.html research.google.com/pubs/author17184.html

Ramanathan V. Guha is an Indian-born computer scientist. He contributed to the creation of widely used web standards such as RSS, RDF and Schema.org, as well as to products such as Google Custom Search. He was a co-founder of Epinions and Alpiri. He worked at Google for nearly two decades, most recently as a Google Fellow, before announcing his departure from the company in August 2024. He then joined Microsoft as CVP and Technical Fellow, where he conceived and developed NLWeb.

== Education ==
Guha did his schooling from Loyola High School, Pune and graduated with Bachelor of Technology in Mechanical Engineering from the Indian Institute of Technology Madras, Master of Science from University of California, Berkeley and Ph.D from Stanford University.

== Career ==
Guha was one of the early co-leaders of the Cyc Project where he worked from 1987 through 1994 at Microelectronics and Computer Technology Corporation in collaboration with Douglas Lenat. He was responsible for the design and implementation of key parts of the Cyc system, including the CycL knowledge representation language, the upper ontological layers of the Cyc Knowledge Base and some parts of the original Cyc Natural Language understanding system.

Leaving what became Cycorp, Guha founded Q Technology, which created a database schema mapping tool called Babelfish. In 1994, he moved to work at Apple Computer, reporting to Alan Kay, where he developed the Meta Content Framework (MCF) format. In 1997 he joined Netscape where, in collaboration with Tim Bray, he created a new version of MCF that used the XML language and which became the main technical precursor to W3C's Resource Description Framework (RDF) standard.

Guha also contributed to the "smart browsing" features of Netscape 4.5 and was instrumental in Netscape's acquisition of NewHoo, which Netscape rebranded the Open Directory Project. He created the first version of RSS as part of a move in which the My.Netscape portal was opened to wider participation in March 1999. In 1999 he left Netscape and in May co-founded Epinions, where he worked until 2000. Guha founded Alpiri in late 2000 which created TAP, a semantic web application and knowledge base. In 2002, he became a researcher at IBM Almaden Research Center.

In 2005, Guha joined Google and became a Google Fellow. While at Google he has been responsible for Google Custom Search and a number of enhancements to Adwords (later Google Ads). He is also one of the founders of Schema.org and Datacommons.org. After nearly two decades with the company, he announced his departure in August 2024.

== Awards ==
On January 26, 2013, Guha was named as a Distinguished Alumnus of the Indian Institute of Technology Madras.

December 8, 2015 named as a ACM Fellow for contributions to structured data representation and specification and their impact on the Web
