= TouchWave =

American private IP-telephony company

TouchWave, Inc.
- Company type: Private
- Available in: English
- Founded: Palo Alto, California
- Headquarters: Menlo Park, California
- Current status: acquired

TouchWave, Inc. (now WebCom), was a privately held Palo Alto, California IP-telephony network switch provider founded in 1997. TouchWave developed a product line called WebSwitch that was designed to replace traditional private telephone exchange systems in small-to-medium-sized companies. WebSwitch was part of a phone system that incorporates communication features provided by the Internet. The rapid success of TouchWave was memorialized with awards and an acquisition by Ericsson Communications for $46M two years after TouchWave was founded. Ericsson continued the TouchWave product line under the name WebCom, but its efforts have been viewed as less than successful.

== History ==
In 1997, TouchWave was a privately held, venture-backed startup company in Palo Alto, California, with future entrepreneur Oliver Muoto as its marketing director. Co-founded by CEO Bo Larsson, Jeff Snider, David F. Wittenkamp, and Jesper Stroe, TouchWave released its first product, WebSwitch, in 1997. WebSwitch, a Web-based phone switch, provided telephony over IP and targeted small to medium-sized businesses and branch networks of larger organizations. The WebSwitch was designed to deliver significantly lower costs for communications, ease of management and administration and offered services on a single IP-based network platform. The timing of TouchWave's late 1997 release of its phone switch product matched Level 3's development of its first softswitch, a method to connect calls from one phone line to another without a need to use traditional hardware.

TouchWave made significant business and technology advances in 1998 and quickly became a recognized contributor to the VoIP industry. In March 1998, TouchWave received the Best of Show Award at both at the Microsoft Network Telephony Forum and the Computer Telephony Expo (Los Angeles) for its WebSwitch product. In April, Communications Convergence magazine identified TouchWave's WebSwitch as "[hinting] at the future, where voice and data will live together on a single network." In July, TouchWave entered into a partnership agreement with British Telecom, the dominant fixed line telecommunications and broadband Internet provider in the United Kingdom. The partnership brought TouchWave access to technical recommendations and product feedback from British Telecom to be used to develop WebSwitch. In August, Computer Telephony awarded TouchWave its Editor's Choice Award for the WebSwitch product. In September, TouchWave introduced a new version of WebSwitch. In October 1998, TouchWave entered into an agreement with Telogy Networks to include Telogy's embedded communications software in WebSwitch in order to improve the quality of its sound transmission. By the end of 1998, TouchWave had improved its product line to where it could replace traditional private telephone exchange systems in small-to-medium-sized companies throughout the world.

By early April 1999, TouchWave had upgraded their WebSwitch 1608 local area network distributed phone system to a product called WebSwitch 2000. On April 13, 1999, Swedish telecommunication company Ericsson announced that it had purchased TouchWave for $46 million. In exchange for the $46M, TouchWave provided Ericsson with Internet Protocol centric network products such as business phone and private business exchanges. The acquisition of TouchWave came at a time when multibillion-dollar companies were acquiring other relatively small Internet-connected companies, such as WebLine, Selsius, GeoTel, NBX, Dialogic, and Summa Four. Some employees from TouchWave eventually followed serial entrepreneur and former TouchWave president and CEO Samir Lehaff to Adomo, Inc., a provider of voicemail majordomo services. TouchWave co-founder Jeff Snider would go on to be vice president of enterprise sales at Ericsson and then a CEO co-founder of Adomo in 1999.

== WebCom ==
With Ericsson's 1999 purchase, TouchWave became a subsidiary of Ericsson and was renamed WebCom. In April 2000, Ericsson WebCom, now based in Menlo Park, California, expanded TouchWave's WebSwitch product line with the WebSwitch 100 Phone Gateway and IP Extension Gateway. In January 2003, Business Communications Review magazine stated that Ericsson's acquisition of TouchWave "turned out to be of little consequence." A year later, that same magazine asserted that Ericsson's acquisition of TouchWave had not produced a desired result, writing that it had "borne little fruit."
