= Vignette Corporation =

US company

- Industry: Software
- Founded: 1995; 31 years ago
- Founder: Ross Garber; Neil Webber
- Defunct: July 21, 2009; 17 years ago
- Fate: Acquired by Open Text Corporation
- Headquarters: Austin, Texas

Vignette Corporation was a company that offered a suite of content management, web portal, collaboration, document management, and records management software. Targeted at the enterprise market, Vignette offered products under the name StoryServer that allowed non-technical users to create, edit and track content through workflows and publish it on the web. It provided integration for enterprise resource planning, customer relationship management and legacy systems, supporting Java EE and Microsoft.NET. Vignette's integrated development environment and application programming interface offered an alternative to conventional Common Gateway Interface/vi/Perl web development. StoryServer was used on many large websites including those of CNET, UnitedHealth Group, The Walt Disney Company, Wachovia, Martha Stewart, Fox News, National Geographic Channel, Pharmacia & Upjohn, MetLife, BSkyB, the 2004 Summer Olympics, and NASA.

Its V6 content suites was priced at $200,000-$400,000.

In 2009, the company was acquired by Open Text Corporation.

== History ==
In November 1995, Ross Garber and Neil Webber founded the company with the goal of making web publishing easier and more personalized.

In 1996, the company developed StoryBuilder, its first product, which handled large-scale content management workflow. During the initial development, Vignette partnered with CNET, which had developed its own technology called PRISM that allowed for the creation and delivery of large, database-driven websites. CNET transferred the technology and $500,000 in cash to Vignette for a 33% stake in the company.

In February 1996, the company received $400,000 of seed money from Austin Ventures and Sigma Partners.

In July 1996, the company raised $3 million.

In January 1997, the company released StoryServer, developed from technology acquired from CNET. It was updated in September 1997.

In January 1998, Vignette and Firefly Networks proposed the XML based Information and Content Exchange (ICE) protocol for content syndication and submitted the specification to the World Wide Web Consortium standards body on October 26, 1998.

In May 1998, the company acquired RandomNoise.

In June 1998, Garber hired Greg Peters to succeed him as CEO, and Garber became chairman of the board.

In July 1998, the company launched StoryServer 4, which featured strong support of XML technology.

By December 1998, the company raised an additional $27.5 million in venture capital.

The number of the company's customers rose from 130 in 1998 to 700 in 2000.

On February 19, 1999, during the dot-com bubble, the company became a public company via an initial public offering. On the first day of trading, the stock price rose 152%, from $19 to $47.

On February 22, 1999, the company release Vignette Syndication Server.

In May 1999, the company acquired Diffusion for 400,000 shares of its stock, then worth $32.9 million.

In January 2000, the company acquired DataSage, a data mining and personalization application vendor, for $606 million.

In May 2000, the company acquired OnDisplay, an e-business application vendor, for $1.4 billion.

By June 2000, the company had 1,300 employees and its stock had risen more than 1,500% from its IPO price, to $297 per share, giving the company a market capitalization of nearly $9 billion.

In August 2000, the company signed a deal with IBM.

In March 2001, Thomas E. Hogan was named president of the company.

In April 2001, as the dot-com bubble burst, the company sued 13 customers that had not paid for software they received.

In February 2002, the company's products were used for the website of The Wall Street Journal.

In July 2002, Hogan was named CEO.

In October 2002, the company acquired Epicentric for $32 million. The company also announced Vignette V7.

In March 2003, the company moved its offices.

In December 2003, the company acquired CMS vendor Intraspect for $20 million.

In March 2004, the company acquired Tower Technology, an Australian-based provider of enterprise document and records management software, for $125 million.

In February 2006, the company appointed Mike Aviles as CEO.

In April 2008, the company acquired Vidavee, a SaaS-based Web video publishing company, for $6.6 million.

On July 21, 2009, Open Text Corporation acquired the company for $321 million in cash and stock.
