= HotSauce =

Apple software

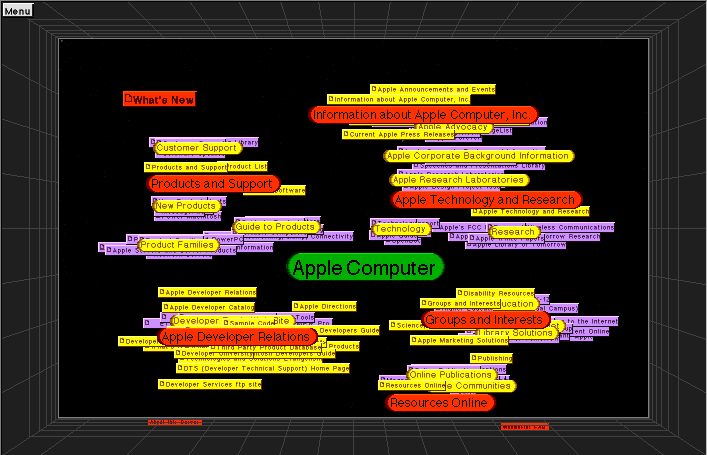
HotSauce navigation interface

HotSauce (code-named Project X) was experimental software developed by Apple Computer as a sample application of its Meta Content Framework. HotSauce generated a 3D visualization of the contents of an MCF file, for example, a website sitemap. It could also be used to navigate the contents of the user's hard drive.

The interface presented the different nodes as "bubbles" floating in space, to which users could "fly" to, in an effect similar to the one found later in Apple's Time Machine backup software.

Apple offered beta versions of HotSauce as a web browser plug-in for the classic Mac OS and Microsoft Windows and a stand-alone application.

HotSauce was never released in a final version and while MCF was adopted by thousands of websites, including Yahoo!, most users saw no point in navigating them in a 3D space. The project was discontinued along with MCF shortly after Steve Jobs' return to the company in 1997.
