= Tim Bray =

Canadian software developer (born 1955)

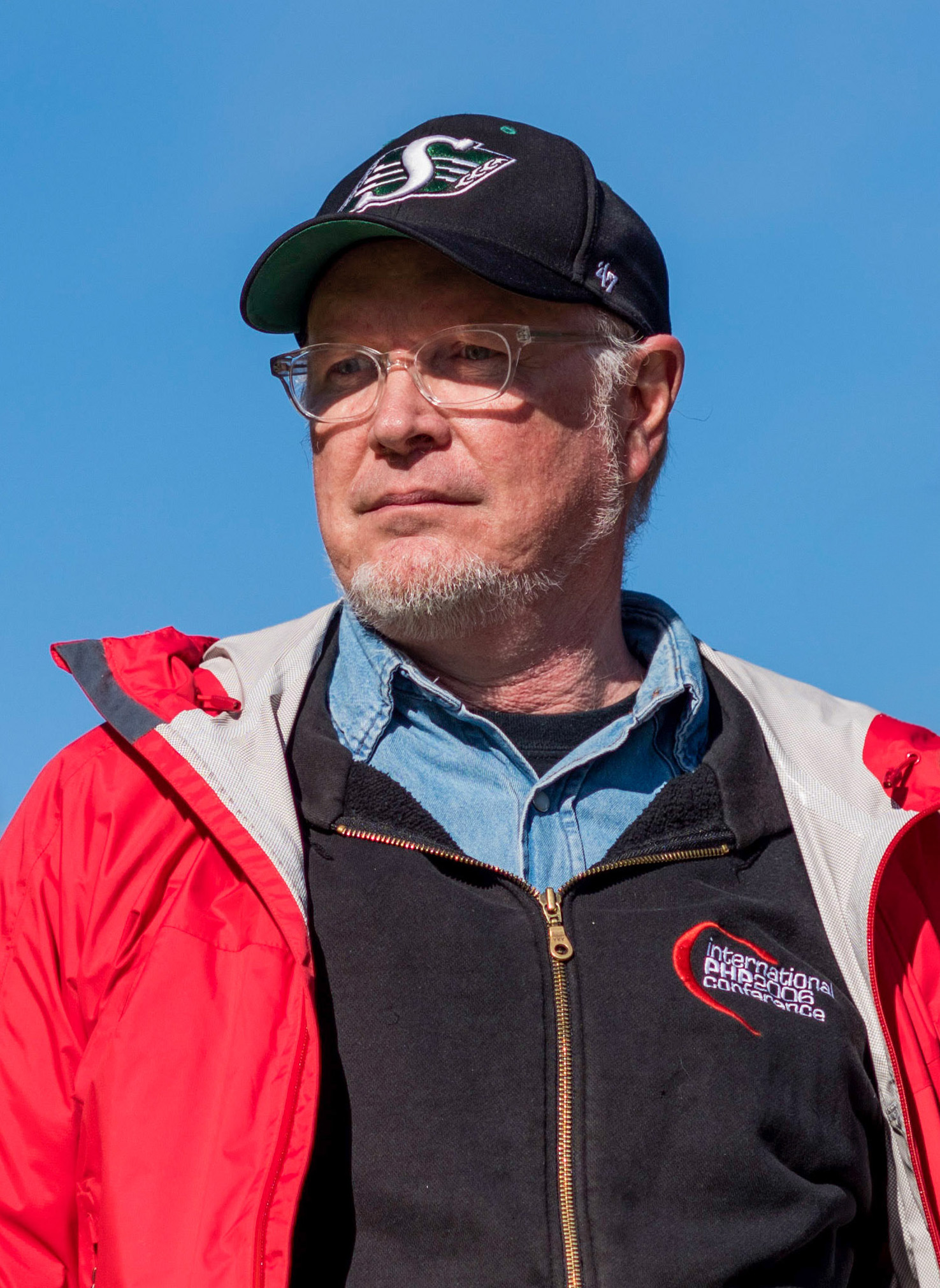
- Tim Bray in 2018
- Born: June 21, 1955 (age 71); Alberta, Canada
- Education: University of Guelph (BS)
- Employers: Digital Equipment Corporation; University of Waterloo; Waterloo Maple; Open Text Corporation; Antarctica Systems; World Wide Web Consortium (W3C); Sun Microsystems; Google; Centre for Digital Media; Amazon.com
- Known for: Web standards; Co-author of XML specification
- Spouse: Lauren Wood
- Website: www.tbray.org/ongoing

Timothy William Bray (born June 21, 1955) is a Canadian software developer, environmentalist and political activist and one of the co-authors of the original XML specification. He worked for Amazon Web Services from December 2014 until May 2020 when he quit due to concerns over the terminating of whistleblowers. Previously he has been employed by Google, Sun Microsystems and Digital Equipment Corporation (DEC). Bray has also founded or co-founded several start-ups, such as Antarctica Systems.

== Education and early life ==
Bray was born on June 21, 1955 in Alberta, Canada, where his father worked for the Dominion Experimental Farm Service in Fort Vermilion. He grew up in Beirut, Lebanon, and returned to Canada to attend school at the University of Guelph in Guelph, Ontario. He graduated in 1981 with a Bachelor of Science, double majoring in mathematics and computer Science. In 2009, he would return to Guelph to receive an honorary doctorate. Tim described his switch of focus from math to computer science this way:

"In math I'd worked like a dog for my Cs, but in CS I worked much less for As—and learned that you got paid well for doing it."

== Career ==
Bray joined Digital Equipment Corporation (DEC) in Toronto as a software specialist. In 1983, Bray left DEC for Microtel Pacific Research. He joined the New Oxford English Dictionary (OED) project at the University of Waterloo in 1987 as its manager. It was during this time Bray worked with SGML, a technology that would later become central to both Open Text Corporation and his XML and Atom standardization work. Bray co-founded Antarctica Systems - in 2002, during his tenure as CEO for Antarctica, Bray was included in Upside magazine's elite 100 list, alongside other IT leaders like Bill Gates, Steve Jobs, Michael Dell and Larry Ellison. Bray was director of Web Technologies at Sun Microsystems from early 2004 to early 2010. He joined Google as a developer advocate in 2010 focusing on Android, and then on technologies related to identity, such as OAuth and OpenID. He left Google in March 2014, unwilling to relocate to Silicon Valley from Vancouver. He started working for Amazon Web Services (AWS) in December 2014. Bray left AWS in May 2020, after being dismayed by Amazon's treatment of whistleblowers who had raised concerns over the safety of warehouse workers in relation to the COVID-19 pandemic. Bray had held the vice president rank, stating on his blog that "VPs shouldn't go publicly rogue", and had much praise for AWS, yet he wasn't pleased about his co-workers being fired.

Bray's entrepreneurial activities include:

=== Waterloo Maple ===
Bray served as the part-time chief executive officer of Waterloo Maple during 1989–1990. Waterloo Maple is the developer of the Maple mathematical software.

=== Open Text Corporation ===
Bray left the new OED project in 1989 to co-found Open Text Corporation with two colleagues. Open Text commercialised the search engine employed in the new OED project.

Bray recalled that "in 1994 I heard a conference speaker say that search engines would be big on the Internet, and in five seconds all the pieces just fell into place in my head. I realized that we could build such a thing with our technology." Thus in 1995, Open Text released the Open Text Index, one of the first popular commercial web search engines. Open Text Corporation is publicly traded on the Nasdaq under the symbol OTEX. From 1991 until 1996, Bray was senior vice president—technology'.

=== Textuality ===
Bray, along with his wife Lauren Wood, ran Textuality, a consulting practice in the field of web and publishing technology. He was contracted by Netscape in 1999, along with Ramanathan V. Guha, in part to create a new version of the Meta Content Framework called Resource Description Framework, which used the XML language.

=== Antarctica Systems ===
In 1999, he founded Antarctica Systems, a Vancouver, British Columbia, Canada-based company that specialized in visualization-based business analytics.

== Web standards ==
Bray has contributed to standards in technology, particularly Web standards at the World Wide Web Consortium (W3C).

=== XML ===
As an Invited Expert at the World Wide Web Consortium between 1996 and 1999, Bray co-edited the XML and XML namespace specifications. Halfway through the project Bray accepted a consulting engagement with Netscape, provoking vociferous protests from Netscape competitor Microsoft (who had supported the initial moves to bring SGML to the web.) Bray was temporarily asked to resign the editorship. This led to intense dispute in the Working Group, eventually solved by the appointment of Microsoft's Jean Paoli as third co-editor.

In 2001, Bray wrote an article called Taxi to the Future for Xml.com which proposed a means to improve web client user experience and web server system performance via a Transform-Aggregate-send XML-Interact architecture—this proposed system is very similar to the Ajax paradigm, popularized around 2005.

=== W3C TAG ===
Between 2001 and 2004 he served as a Tim Berners-Lee appointee to the W3C Technical Architecture Group.

=== Atom ===
Until October 2007, Bray was co-chair, with Paul Hoffman, of the Atom-focused Atompub Working Group of the Internet Engineering Task Force. Atom is a web syndication format developed to address perceived deficiencies with the RSS 2.0 format.

=== JSON ===
Bray worked with the IETF JSON Working Group in 2013 and 2014, serving as editor of RFC 7159, a specification of the JSON Data Interchange Format which revised RFC 4627 and highlighted interoperability best practices, released in March 2014. He also edited RFC 8259, a further revision of JSON.

== Software ==
Bray has written software applications, including Bonnie which was the inspiration for Bonnie++, a Unix file system benchmarking tool; Lark, the first XML processor; and APE, the Atom Protocol Exerciser.

== Environmentalism ==
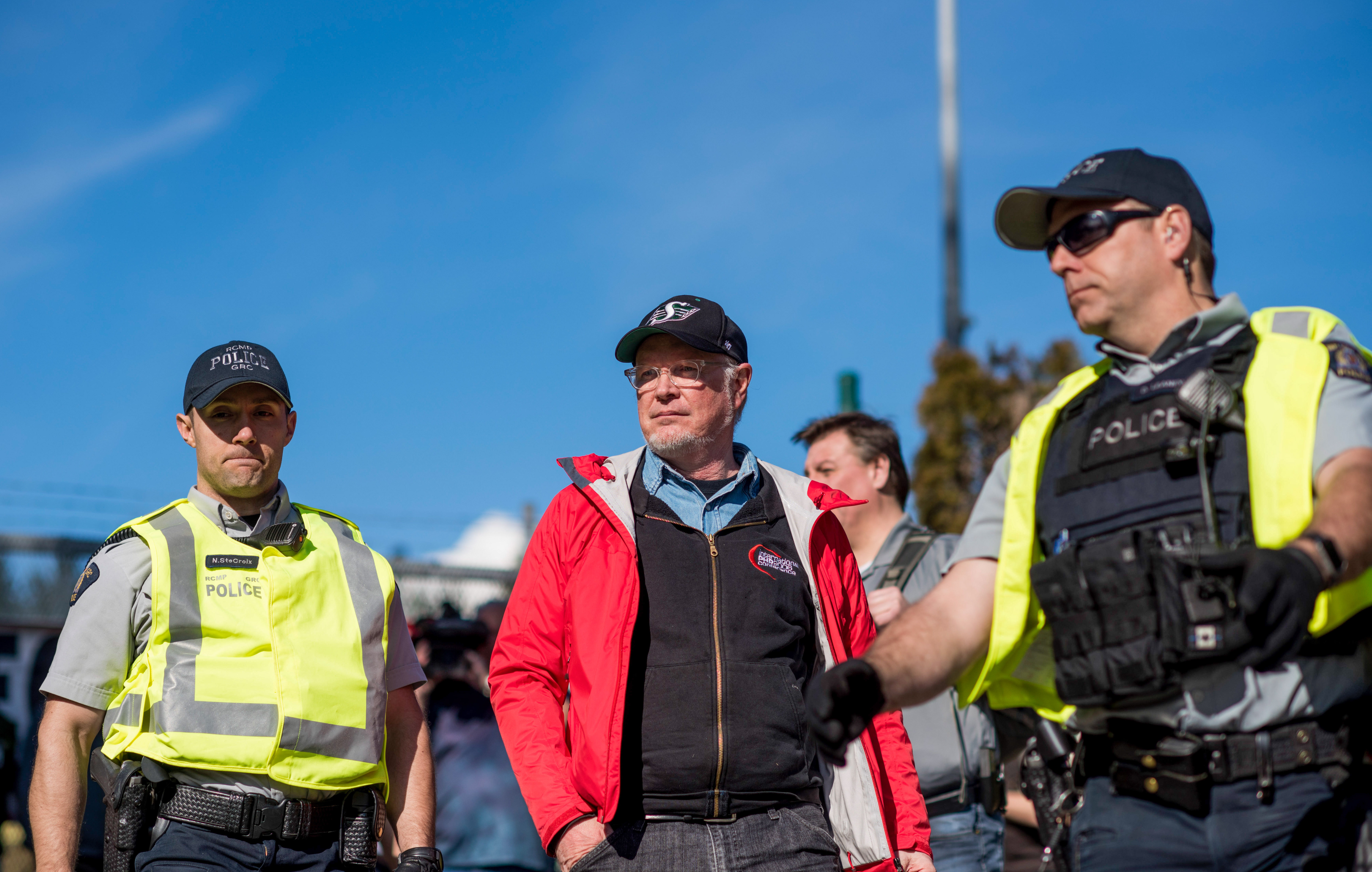
Bray being arrested at the Trans Mountain Pipeline protest in 2018

Starting in 2018, Bray became visible as an environmentalist in the context of the Trans Mountain Pipeline dispute. On April 18, 2018, he was arrested for contempt of court at a demonstration at the Trans Mountain site in Burnaby, Canada. He also participated in an open letter from business leaders to the British Columbia government and was subsequently a public voice against the project. In 2019, Bray was the only VP-level Amazon employee to sign a letter to Amazon shareholders calling for a stop to Amazon Web Services' support for oil extraction.

In 2024, Bray co-edited a book titled Standing On High Ground, a collection of personal stories of individuals who were arrested while protesting the Trans Mountain pipeline expansion.

== Bibliography ==
- Cornell, Rosemary; Drobnies, Adrienne; Bray, Tim, eds. (2024). Standing on High Ground: Civil Disobedience on Burnaby Mountain. Toronto, Ontario: Between the Lines. ISBN 9781771136631. OCLC 1432733930.

== See also ==
- List of University of Waterloo people
