= Scan-Optics =

American document imaging company

Scan-Optics LLC
- Type: Private company
- Industry: Document imaging
- Founded: 1968; 58 years ago
- Headquarters: Manchester, Connecticut, United States
- Key people: Jeff Mitchell (CEO); Tom Revall (CFO)
- Products: Intelligent data capture for document-based business process automation, enterprise search, document imaging, production scanners, high speed image capture, process workflow, data recognition
- Services: Computer data storage, computer software, enterprise information management
- Number of employees: 51-200 employees
- Website: www.scanoptics.com

Scan-Optics LLC is an American document imaging company that provides enterprise content management, optical character recognition (OCR) software, and image scanner manufacturing. The company is headquartered in Manchester, Connecticut.

Scan-Optics' records management, information, data remanence, data backup and data recovery services are supplied to government and business customers throughout North America and Europe, while its industrial high-speed digital imaging and OCR SO-series scanners are being used worldwide.

== History and technology ==
Scan-Optics was founded in 1968 by four Connecticut men with financial backing from The Travelers Companies. Its goal of developing the brand-new and barely functioning optical character recognition (OCR) technology. Scan-Optics was one of the technology groups enabling the transition from paper to digital.

Scan-Optics developed the image dissector tube and made it commercially available, pioneered an alphanumeric handwriting recognition system, and introduced key data entry integrated with optical character recognition via a direct computer-to-computer link to accomplish image reject repair. In a 1997 study, Doculabs classified Scan-Optics' intelligent character recognition (ICR) as "a significant improvement over standard ICR technology" - in tests using 3,400 forms completed from a national sample of the general population, only Scan-Optics' ICR technology yielded a field read rate accuracy of approximately 90%.

By 2013, Scan-Optics' developments included acoustic double page detection, context edit, the integration of magnetic ink character recognition (MICR) and barcode reading into the recognition system and the introduction of grayscale capability in OCR.
