= Shopping.com =

Price comparison service company

- Industry: Internet
- Predecessor: DealTime
- Founded: 1998; 28 years ago
- Founder: Nahum Sharfman; Amir Ashkenazi
- Fate: Acquired by eBay
- Headquarters: Brisbane, California, United States
- Products: Price comparison engine
- Services: Price comparison services
- Number of employees: 230+ (2012)
- Parent: eBay
- Website: www.shopping.com

Shopping.com is a price comparison service owned by eBay and operates websites in the United States, United Kingdom, France, Germany, and Australia. Shopping.com started out with the name DealTime.com which now redirects users to Shopping.com.

== History ==
Shopping.com began as Papricom (DealTime.com), which was founded in Israel in 1998 by Dr. Nahum Sharfman and Amir Ashkenazi, the original business model was to create a downloadable client that would monitor changes in prices of products the user seeks to buy over time, notifying the user when the product price reached a predetermined level (hence the site's original name, DealTime). Originally targeting American consumers, the basic concept was quickly modified from a downloadable client to a purely web-based service, a concept the company has kept ever since.

After recruiting a management team of high-ranking executives from other industries, DealTime underwent rapid expansion in 2000 including formation of a major alliance with media giant Bertelsmann, adding British, German, Spanish and Japanese versions of its original American-targeted website, and acquiring Digital Jones, a product advisory website. However, during 2000 and 2001 it became apparent that the operation was losing a significant amount of money and that massive changes were needed. Three rounds of layoffs done in 2001 and 2002 halved the workforce to some 150; the Japanese and German websites were scrapped in late 2001, as well as plans for an early IPO, and Digital Jones was shelved. Also, a growing percentage of the merchants being advertised on DealTime's website were forced to start paying for this service or become de-listed; some lucrative product categories became paying-merchants-only. In 2002, a new bidding system was introduced, in which the highest-bidding merchant got higher placement on the default price comparison results page (consumers could always sort by price or rating). All these changes enabled the company to become profitable for the first time in 2003.

Under the leadership of its CEO, Daniel T. Ciporin, in April 2003, DealTime acquired the California-based consumer product review site Epinions.com. In September 2003, the merged sites relaunched under the Shopping.com brand and web address which it had purchased from Alta Vista. The new name, as well as some offline (TV) advertisement and large online advertisement with partners such as Google and other portals, enabled Shopping.com to become the 3rd most-visited consumer website, following eBay and Amazon, for several months during 2004, and continuously in the top-10. Although Shopping.com remained an Israeli corporation with R&D facilities in Netanya, Israel, it had a strong US presence with its corporate headquarters first in New York City (1998–2003) and later in Brisbane, California.

The company went finally public in October 2004, and was acquired by eBay in June 2005 for $21 per share in cash, or total consideration of approximately $634 million. It is currently a semi-autonomous division within eBay and still runs the www.shopping.com website. eBay and Shopping.com functionalities are slowly being merged, for example eBay's PayPal payment system in SDC's offering to its advertising merchants. Shopping.com accepts CPC bidding. Merchants must pay a minimum of $100.

Since 2005, the company has added French, Australian and once again a German version of its website.

In April 2009, 61-year-old Nahum Sharfman was killed, along with his wife Nava, when their private plane crashed in Greece.

== See also ==
- Amazon.com
- eBay
- Kelkoo USA Website
- Price comparison service
- Silicon Wadi
