= Epinions =

Defunct general consumer review website

Epinions.com
- Website type: Online marketplace
- Available in: English
- Owner: eBay
- Founders: Naval Ravikant; Ramanathan V. Guha; Mike Speiser; Nirav Tolia; Dion Lim
- Website: www.epinions.com
- Commercial: yes
- Launched: 1999; 27 years ago
- Current status: Defunct in 2018

Epinions.com was a general consumer review site established in 1999. Epinions was acquired in 2003 by DealTime, later Shopping.com, which was acquired by eBay in 2005. Epinions users could access paid product reviews; the company sold advertising on its site and shared the revenue with authors as an incentive for quality content. Competition from sites that crowdsourced reviews for free led to years of financial decline. On 25 March 2014, all community features and features for submitting and editing reviews were disabled. Subsequently, in May 2018, the site was fully closed down, and URLs in the epinions.com domain redirect to Shopping.com.

== History ==
Epinions was founded in 1999, during the dot-com bubble, by Nirav Tolia (who left Yahoo and $10M of unvested shares), Naval Ravikant (formerly of @Home where he left $4M in options), Ramanathan V. Guha (from Netscape by way of AOL where he left ~$4M in stock options), Mike Speiser (formerly of McKinsey), and Dion Lim (formerly of Morgan Stanley) with $8 million in seed financing from venture capitalists Benchmark Capital and August Capital.

By January 2003, it had 5.8 million users, but all of the founders, other than Tolia, had left, and the company had just started to make a profit in 2002. In the words of Tolia: "We felt we couldn't finish what we started because we had a little problem. We needed a viable business model."

In 2003, the company Dealtime acquired Epinions for an undisclosed amount of stock, and Tolia became the COO of the new company, Shopping.com. The four co-founders who had left consented to the deal, which rendered their shares worthless. Shopping.com had an initial public offering on October 30, 2004. At the end of trading that day, Shopping.com was worth $750 million; the two VC firms' shares were worth ~$60M, and Tolia's shares were worth ~$20M.

In January 2005, the four co-founders who had left and other Epinions employee-stockholders filed a lawsuit against Tolia and the two VC firms that provided seed funding. The suit claimed that the defendants "failed to share with them 'material facts concerning Epinions' financial affairs,' including news of a deal with Google that the company knew would increase its 2003 profit by 1,400 percent". The case was settled by December 2005; financial terms were not disclosed.

In June 2005, eBay and Shopping.com announced that eBay would acquire Shopping.com for $634M and the transaction was completed in August of that year.

The company started relatively early in the history of crowdsourcing online content, before it was clear which business models would be successful. Competitors found that consumers were willing to provide product reviews for free, and that, especially with a large volume, these were of adequate quality. This undercut Epinion's costs and resulted in years of financial decline. Over time, unpaid crowdsourced reviews became common on e-commerce sites, especially marketplaces like eBay and Amazon.com. These sites earn revenue from the reviews indirectly, when consumers buy items from the marketplace after using the reviews to reduce uncertainty about the quality or appropriateness of products or the trustworthiness of sellers.

Epinions also faced competition from niche sites like Yelp and TripAdvisor, and people sharing opinions for free on social media sites that did not exist when the company started.

On February 25, 2014, the company announced that as of March 25, 2014, all Epinions community features and member login would be removed and/or disabled from the Epinions website. The staff at Epinions made it clear that the community members would no longer be able to delete or edit their content submissions and that their submissions would remain on Epinions and the eBay networks without future compensation.

No new product reviews appeared on the site after March 2014; the site was shut down and redirected to shopping.com in May 2018.

== Mechanisms ==
Authors were paid for reviews on a vast catalog of items, but other site users determined how visible any given review was.

Epinions.com's reputation system was not abuse-proof, but the company maintained a customer care unit in the event a dispute did arise.

Early in 2000, the San Francisco Chronicle interviewed co-founder Mike Speiser and early member Brian Koller, with Speiser claiming the system prevents advertorials from getting exposure, but Koller saying: "There is a lot of 'You scratch my back, I'll scratch yours,' and mutual admiration societies. You recommend me and mine, I'll do the same for you."

The site was also recognized in 2007 by the "Internet for Beginners" writer for About.com as one of the web's 10 most valuable websites. Calling the site "wonderful", "Internet for Beginners" Editor Paul Gil wrote, "This is a truly valuable resource for the smart consumer.". The praise was echoed by a CBS television affiliate in California that named Epinions its "Site of the Day"

== See also ==
- Consumer protection
- Reputation system
- Reputation management
