= Product Hunt =

American product discovery website

- Screenshot Product Hunt homepage on April 18, 2019
- Website type: Product sharing
- Available in: English
- Founder: Ryan Hoover
- CEO: Rajiv Ayyangar
- Website: www.producthunt.com
- Registration: Optional (required to vote)
- Launched: November 6, 2013
- Current status: Online
- Native clients on: iOS, Android, macOS, Google Chrome

Product Hunt is an American website to share and discover new products. It was founded by Ryan Hoover in November 2013. It is owned by AngelList.

Users submit products, which are listed in a linear format by day. The site includes a comments system and a voting system similar to Hacker News or Reddit. The products with the most votes rise to the top of each day's list.

Products are organized into four categories; technology products (web apps, mobile apps, hardware products, etc.), games (PC, web, mobile apps), books and podcasts. A submission simply requires a product title, URL, and tagline. As of 2017, according to Hoover, the website has led to the discovery of over 100 million products across 50,000 companies. A September 2026 check of six daily leaderboards found that all six top-three products on the 2025 days came from venture-funded companies, against 3 of 12 on the 2016 and 2020 days.

The site also includes a daily email list that sends out yesterday's top tech "hunts" (products) as well as a featured collection. A version of the digest is also available for games and books.

Product Hunt is also available as an iOS app, macOS app, an Android app, and Google Chrome extension. The company's headquarters is in San Francisco.

The site received funding from Y Combinator.

== History ==
=== 2013 ===
Product Hunt launched on November 6, 2013, when it began as an email list built using Linkydink. The first version of the website was developed by Nathan Bashaw and Ryan Hoover over the Thanksgiving break in 2013. On July 17, 2014, the company announced its Y Combinator backing.

=== 2014 ===
In Fall 2014, the company announced it would receive $6.1 million in Series A funding led by Andreessen Horowitz.

=== 2015 ===
On February 5, 2015, the company won the "Best New Startup" of 2014 Crunchie Award, an annual award given out by TechCrunch.

In September 2015, the company added a podcast section to the site. However, in 2016, they put an end to it, stating that it would "distract from our main mission" of surfacing great products.

In December 2015, the company launched an iPhone app.

=== 2016 ===
In November 2016, AngelList acquired Product Hunt for $20 million.

=== 2017 ===
In September 2017, Product Hunt launched "Ship", which is a suite of tools for makers to generate and capture demand for their products.

=== 2018 ===
In February 2018, Product Hunt released a new tech news aggregator app called "Sip." Sip was shut down in 2019.

=== 2019 ===
In July 2019, the company launched "Launch Day" to help users monitor their entire launch in real time.

=== 2020 ===
In October 2020, the company announced Josh Buckley, angel investor and founder of Mino Games, as its new CEO.

=== 2021 ===
In August 2021, the company announced Ashley Higgins, former GM, as its new CEO.

=== 2023 ===
In September 2023, the company announced Rajiv Ayyangar, former Tandem founder, as its new CEO.

Shortly thereafter, the company laid off 60% of the team.
