= E-Notícies =

Newspaper published in Barcelona, Spain

- Type: Daily online newspaper
- Format: Digital
- Owner(s): EDR Interactiva S.L. (2000–2023); Carles Borja (2023–present)
- Founder(s): Xavier Rius, Eloi Martín
- Publisher: EDR Interactiva S.L.
- President: Eloi Martín
- Editor-in-chief: Carles Borja
- Editor: Arnau Borràs
- Founded: 2000
- Political alignment: Constitutionalism (Spain)
- Language: Catalan, Spanish
- Headquarters: Barcelona
- Country: Spain
- Website: e-noticies.cat

E-Notícies (catalan for "E-News") is a digital newspaper founded in 2000 by journalist Xavier Rius Tejedor, who was its editor-in-chief until 2023, when he was removed from his position by the new shareholders.

The website, E-Notícies.cat, was launched by Xavier Rius and entrepreneur Eloi Martín, who is CEO of the publication. After working for newspapers such as El Mundo and La Vanguardia, Rius and Martín aimed to create a digital Catalan-language medium based in Barcelona that distanced itself from the pro-independence narratives prevalent in other Catalan digital outlets.

In October 2023, the newspaper changed ownership. Businessman Álvar Thomas acquired the shares and transferred them to his cousin, Carles Borja, who became the majority shareholder. Arnau Borràs took over as editor.

== Criticism ==
In 2015, the Supreme Court of Spain ordered E-Notícies to pay €20,000 in damages to journalist Carlos Quílez for infringing his right to privacy.

Over the years, the outlet has also faced criticism for sensationalist content. This led to the emergence of an anonymous parody blog such called "E-brutícies" (a pun on "brutícies", meaning "filth" in Catalan), which mocked its editorial choices, blocat.com later closed the blog under alleged pressure from E-Notícies.
