= ESDiario =

ESdiario
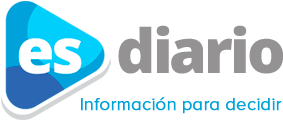
- Type: Digital daily newspaper
- Founder(s): Antonio Martín Beaumont
- Founded: 2015; 10 years ago
- Language: Spanish
- Website: https://www.esdiario.com

ESdiario (ESD) is a Spanish online newspaper about politics and economy founded in 2015.

Antonio Martín Beaumont, political scientist and father of Partido Popular, founded El Semanal Digital in 1999. In 2015 he founded ESdiario as a renewal of El Semanal Digital to offer the best information and based on the analysis and opinion.

== Bibliography ==
- Apezarena, José (2005). Periodismo al oído: los confidenciales : de las cartas manuscritas a Internet. Random House Mondadori. pp. 210–212. ISBN 9788483066386.
