= Siebold Memorial Museum =

Museum in Nagasaki, Japan

- シーボルト記念館
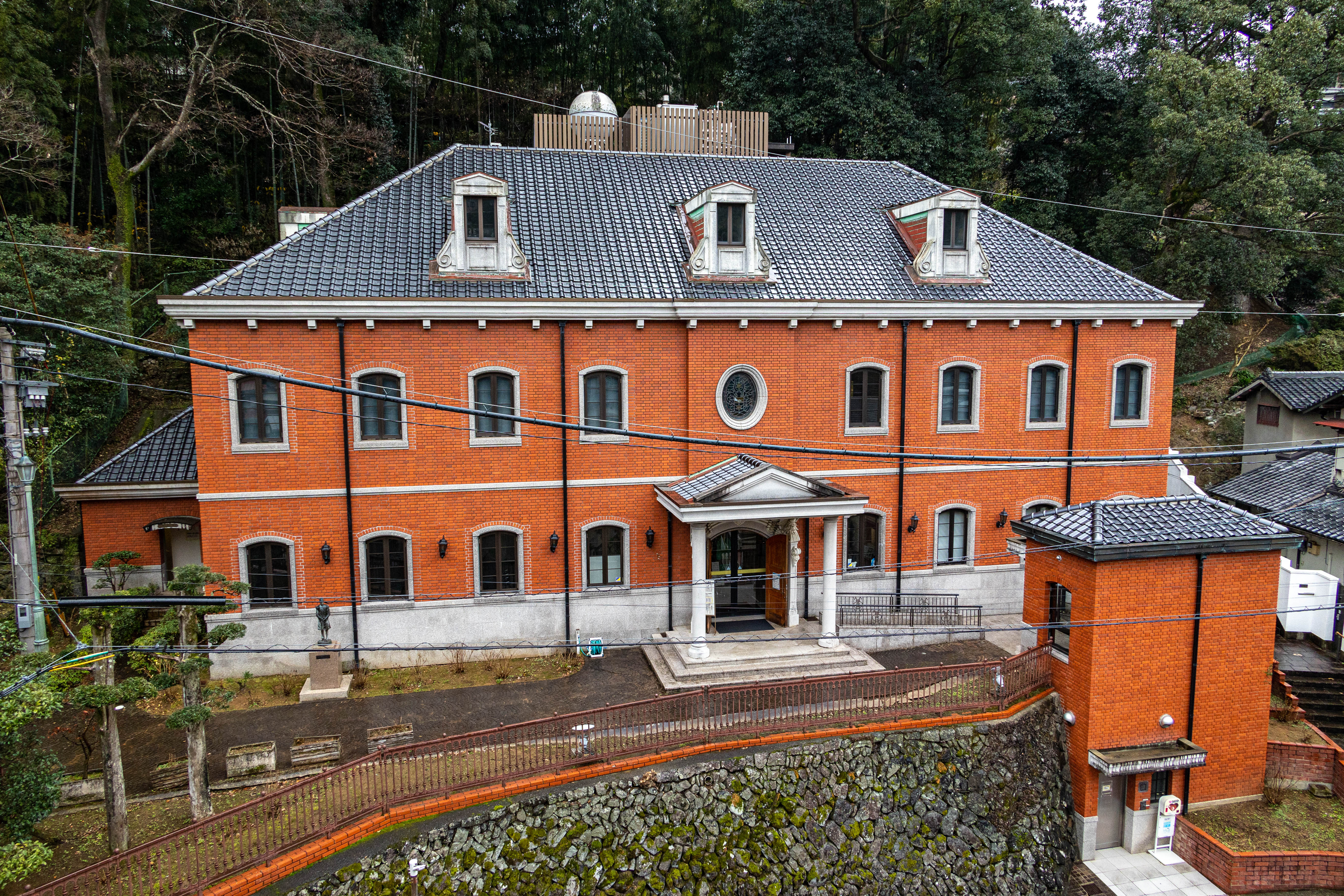
- Siebold Memorial Museum

- Siebold Memorial Museum Siebold Memorial Museum (Japan)
- Established: 1 August 1989
- Location: Nagasaki, Nagasaki, Japan
- Coordinates: 32°45′21.0″N 129°53′32.0″E
- National Historic Site of Japan

Siebold Memorial Museum (シーボルト記念館, Shīboruto Kinenkan) was opened in Nagasaki city on October 1, 1989 in honour of Philipp Franz von Siebold and his contributions to the development of modern science in Japan. The building is modeled on his former house in Leiden, and the entrance is modeled after the former home of Siebold's grandfather, Karl Caspar. The museum displays 206 items classified into six categories describing Von Siebold's six-year stay in Nagasaki, the so-called "Siebold incident", and his life work on Japan. It also exhibits his family tree and items about his common law wife Kusumoto Taki and their daughter Kusumoto Ine, who eventually became Japan's first female doctor.

== Siebold Residence Site ==
The museum is located next to the site of Narutaki-juku, a private school established by Siebold in the suburbs of Nagasaki in 1824. It also served as a clinic. The Narutaki-juku was a two-story wooden building with a library and other facilities, and medicinal herbs collected by Siebold from all over Japan were cultivated in the garden. Siebold taught a wide range of scientific fields, including Western medicine and natural science. More than 50 people studied at Narutaki-juku, including Takano Choei, Itō Genboku and Itō Keisuke. The building was demolished in 1894, and now all that remains are two wells and a tree planted by Siebold. The location was designated a National Historic Site in 1922, under the name "former Siebold residence", although Siebold did not actually live at this location, but commuted to the school from Dejima.

== See also ==
- List of Historic Sites of Japan (Nagasaki)
