= Erika von Erhardt-Siebold =

American literary scholar (1890–1964)

- Born: Erika Helena Henrietta Wanda Freifrau von Siebold; January 15, 1890; Würzburg, Kingdom of Bavaria, Germany
- Died: November 9, 1964 (aged 74); Los Angeles County, California, U.S.
- Occupation: Literary scholar
- Father: Alexander von Siebold
- Relatives: Philipp Franz von Siebold (grandfather)

Academic background
- Education: University of Cambridge; Heidelberg University

Academic work
- Discipline: English literature
- Sub-discipline: Anglo-Saxon riddles
- Institutions: Wittenberg College; Mount Holyoke College; Vassar College

Erika Helena Henrietta Wanda Freifrau von Siebold (January 15, 1890 – November 9, 1964) was an American literary scholar who specialized in Anglo-Saxon riddles. Born in Germany, she emigrated to the United States and worked as a professor at Wittenberg College, Mount Holyoke College, and Vassar College.

== Biography ==
Erika Helena Henriette Vanda Freiin von Siebold was born on January 15, 1890, in Würzburg, Kingdom of Bavaria. Her father Alexander von Siebold was a translator and interpreter and his paternal grandfather Philipp Franz von Siebold was a physician and botanist. After studying at the University of Cambridge and getting a PhD at Heidelberg University in 1918, she began work as a lecturer in English in Germany and Russia, working at the University of Dorpat, University of Freiburg, University of Rostock, and Karlsruhe Institute of Technology. In 1918, she published a book about synesthesia. On August 31, 1922, she married Rudolf Friedrich Georg Freiherr von Erhardt at Berlin.

In 1925, after spending a year at Bryn Mawr College (1924–1925) on a European Fellowship, von Erhardt-Siebold started working as an Associate Professor of French at Wittenberg College. In 1927, she moved to Mount Holyoke College and started working there as an Associate Professor of English Literature. In 1933, she joined the faculty of Vassar College, and she was associate professor of English by 1942. At some time in 1953, she worked at the University of California, Berkeley on research leave.

As an academic, she specialized "in the fields of Old and Middle English and Romanticism", especially Anglo-Saxon riddles, having published a German-language book on the subject in 1925. In March 1938, she published a report that the origins of the word dandelion were connected to dialion, a Latin word for the daily sun path. In 1940, as part of Vassar's 75th anniversary, she and her husband Rudolf published 'The Astronomy of Scotus Erigena and Cosmology in the Annotationes in Marcianum, both of which were about the studies of John Scotus Eriugena. In January 1942, her lecture "Archaeological Riddles of Anglo-Saxon England" took place at the Metropolitan Museum of Art.

She was appointed as a Guggenheim Fellow in 1931. At some point before 1942, she was an American Association of University Women fellow.

She died on November 9, 1964, in Los Angeles County, California.
