= Heinrich Bürger =

German botanist (1806–1858)

- Scientific career
- Fields: Biology, zoology

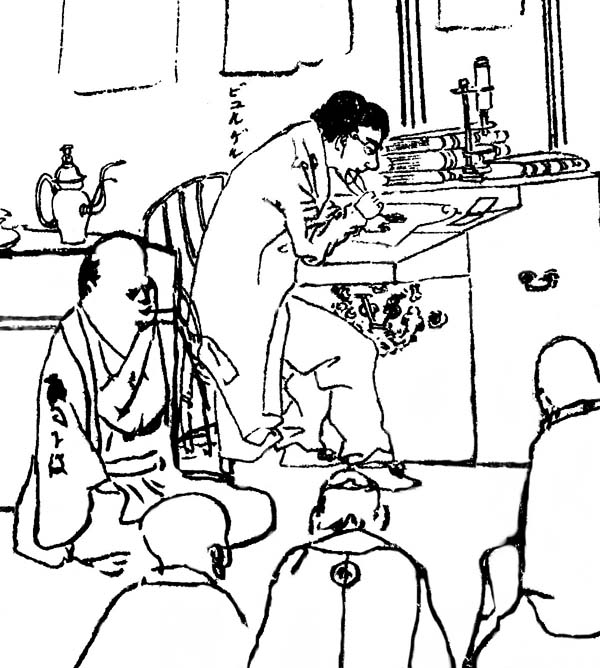
Heinrich Burger in Edo. Drawing in ink by Kazan Watanabe, 1826

Heinrich Bürger (or: Heinrich Burger) (Hamelin, 29 February 1804, or 7 November 1804, or 20 January 1806 – Indramayu (Java) 25 March 1858) was a German physicist, biologist and botanist employed by the Dutch government, and an entrepreneur. He was important for the study of Japanese fauna and flora.

== Background ==
Bürger's exact birth date is unknown. Bürger himself gave 29 February 1804. Most archival sources have the year 1806; it looks as if Heinrich moved his birth date two years back so as to appear older. Bürger was Jewish; his father Samuel Burger was a merchant and 'Schutzjude' in Hamelin, who went bankrupt in 1817, and died in 1821.

== Education ==
In the years 1821–1822 Heinrich studied mathematics and astronomy at Göttingen university. Though he sometimes used the title of doctor, no proof has been found of an academic promotion. In 1824 Bürger left for Batavia (Dutch East Indies), now Jakarta, where he visited the school for apothecaries. On 14 January 1825 he gained the degree of apothecary 3rd class.

== Dejima ==
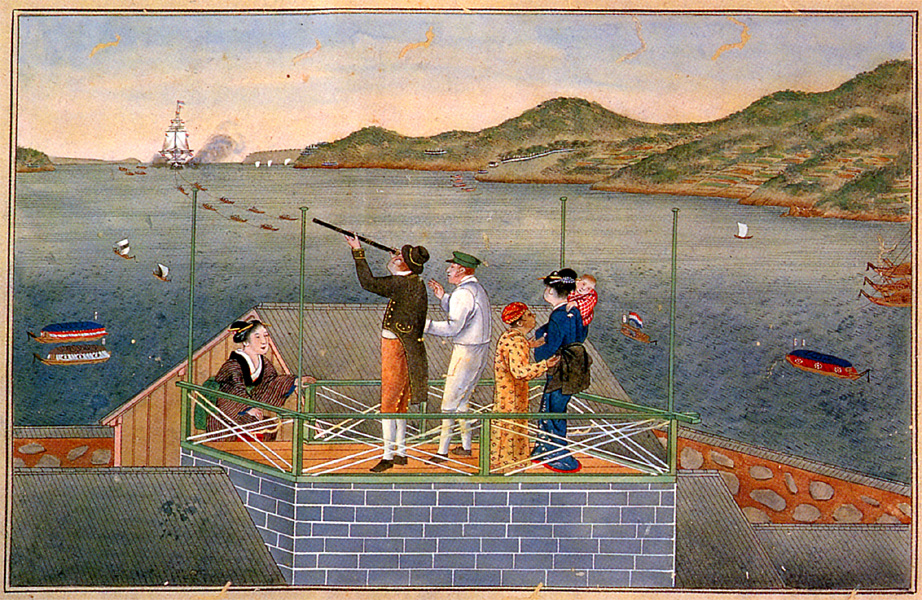
Bürger with Von Siebold and Japanese women watching an incoming towed Dutch sailing ship at Dejima, print by Kawahara Keiga

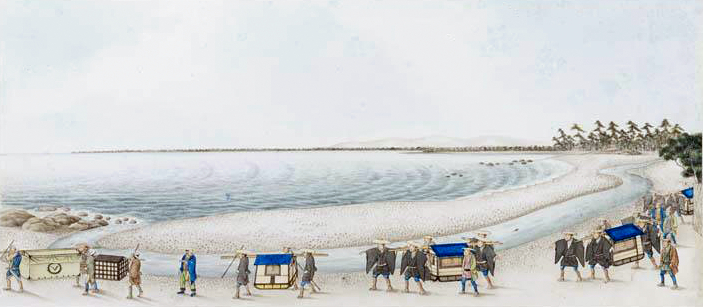
Every year the Dutch have to pay a visit to the court of the shogun, the military leader of Japan, in Edo (present day Tokyo). Everyone who was able to afford it travelled by norimono (litter). The picture shows the delegates on their way (1826) by Kawahara Keiga

On 14 June 1825 Heinrich Bürger was appointed by the Dutch government as the assistant of Philipp Franz von Siebold on the isle of Dejima (Nagasaki, Japan) for the "natural research" in Japan. He left for Japan on 1 July together with Carl Hubert de Villeneuve. On Dejima Bürger did chemistry and biological research, and he taught the Japanese. He also was head of pharmacy and assisted Siebold's polyclinical visits to patients outside Dejima. In 1826, both Bürger and Kawahara Keiga joined Siebold on the court journey to the Shogun in Edo. In 1828 Bürger was appointed as successor of Von Siebold as far as the chemical, natural and biological work was concerned. In the following years he collected large quantities of minerals, plants, reptiles and animals, among which 650 fishes and crustaceans. Bürger began working on a survey of fish, and had Keiga make life-like sketches of 400 species, 200 of which Bürger sent to Siebold along with detailed descriptions. Much of this material was used for the later publication Fauna Japonica by Temminck and Schlegel. Plants sent by Bürger arrived in the botanical gardens of university cities like Leiden, Groningen, Munich, Paris, London, Florence and St. Louis. The Naturalis Museum in Leiden boasts a large Bürger collection.

== Padang ==
In 1832 or 1833 (literary sources contradict each other here) Bürger was "added" to the "Committee for natural research in East-India". In that capacity he visited Sumatra between June and December 1833. In that period he planned a road from the Padang lowlands to the interior; the road through the Anai Valley (Batang Anai), which today is a tourist attraction because of its natural beauty. The realisation of this road earned him the Order of the Netherlands Lion. In 1833 Bürger married Anna Cornelia van Daalen in Padang. In 1834 he was back on Dejima, but he installed his wife in Batavia.

== Entrepreneur ==
From 1 July 1835 Bürger was relieved of his duties in Japan. In 1840–1842 he traveled extensively with his family throughout western Europe. Back on Java he was pensioned off in 1842 as a member of the Natural Committee, and on 30 June 1843 he was honorably discharged from public service. Heinrich then moved into business, a.o. the production of rice and oil on Bangka, the Nederlandsch-Indische Zee-Assurantie Maatschappij (marine insurances), de Maatschappij tot Bevordering van Mijnontginningen in Nederlandsch-Indië (Society for the advancement of mining development in the Dutch Indies), which operated on Borneo, and he was co-owner of sugar factory Rejosari in Magetan (Madiun Residency, Java). Bürger also was a prominent member of the social club "De Harmonie" in Batavia 1850-1853.

== Honours ==
Although Bürger is mentioned in the IPNI, he did not describe new plants. But he has been honoured by those who worked on his collections: they have named many of the new species he collected after him. These species can be recognized by the epitheton “Buergerianum” or “Burgeri(i)”, such as:

“burgerianum” 19 distinct (i.e., excluding combinations for the same plant in different genera) taxa that at some point been published at the level of species including:

- (Aceraceae) Acer buergerianum Miq.
- (Eriocaulaceae) Eriocaulon buergerianum Körn.
- (Polypodiaceae) Lepidomicrosorium buergerianum (Miq.) Ching & K.H.Shing

“buergeri” 10 distinct species level taxa including

- (Ericaceae) Rhododendron buergeri Miq.

== Sources ==
- M. Boeseman: "Revision of the fishes collected by Burger and Von Siebold in Japan", in "Zoologische Mededelingen, Vol. 28, 1947, p. 1–242 Repository.naturalis.nl PDF
- P.M. Kernkamp, "Heinrich Bürger (Hamelen 1804/1806 – Indramajoe 1858) en zijn Duitse en Nederlandse familie", in De Nederlandsche Leeuw 132 (2015) 108–132. Publication on Academia.org
- J. Mac Lean: "Natural science in Japan from 1828–1849", in Janus LXII (1975), p. 5178.
- M.J. van Steenis-Kruseman: "Heinrich Bürger (?1806 – 1858), explorer in Japan and Sumatra, Contributions to the history of botany and exploration in Malaysia", in Blumea - Biodiversity, Evolution and Biogeography of Plants, Vol. 11 (1962), p. 495–508. Repository.naturalis.nl PDF
- M. Uéno: "A Japanese portrait of Heinrich Bürger", i: Zoologische Mededelingen Vol. 49, 1975, p. 91-93 Repository.naturalis.nl PDF
