= Alexander von Siebold =

German translator and interpreter (1846–1911)

Alexander George Gustav von Siebold
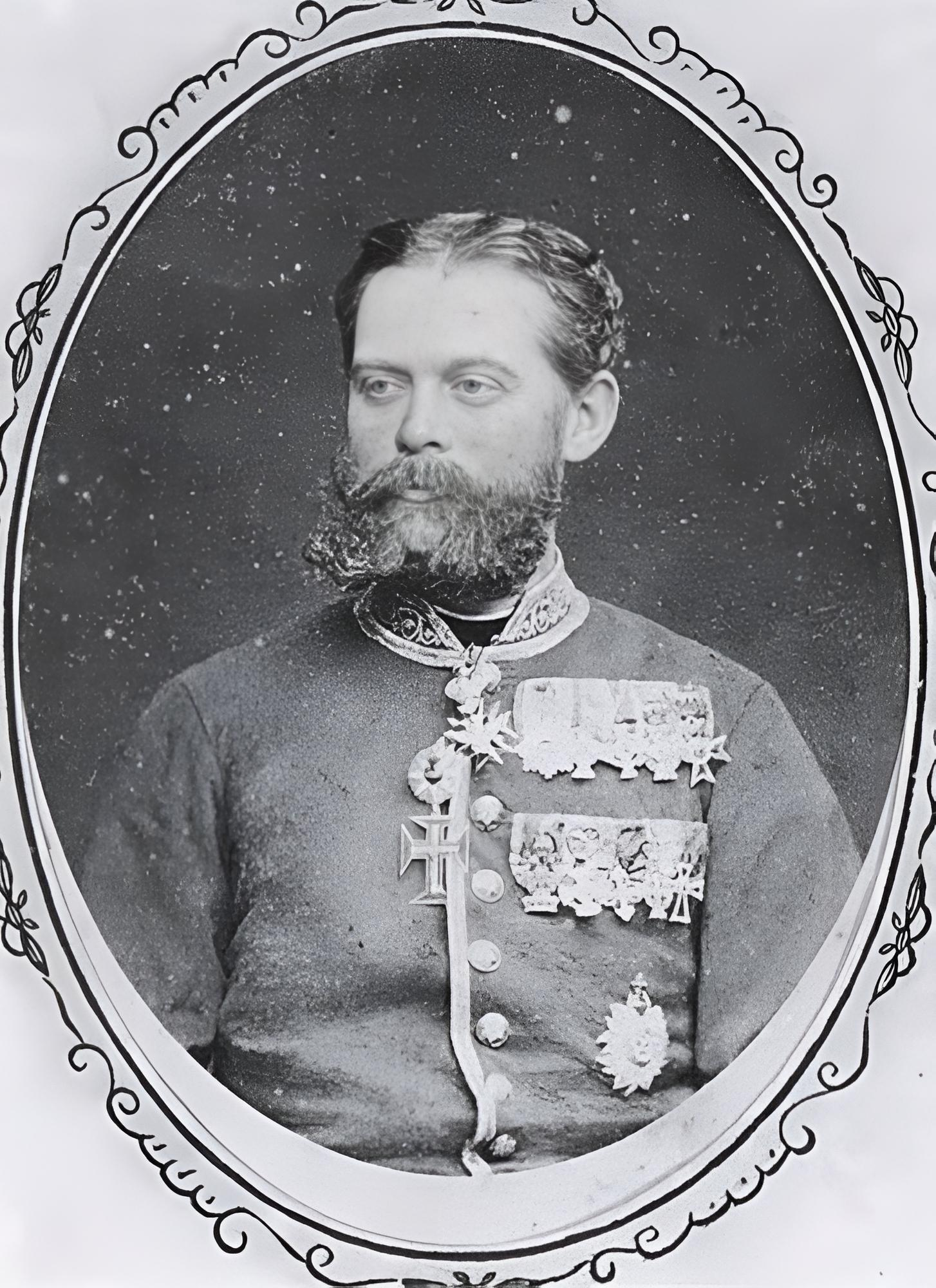
- Born: August 16, 1846; Leyden Netherlands
- Died: January 1911; French Riviera
- Occupations: translator, interpreter
- Parent(s): Philipp Franz von Siebold, Helene von Gagern
- Relatives: Heinrich von Siebold, Kusumoto Ine

Alexander George Gustav von Siebold (August 16, 1846 – January 1911) was a German translator and interpreter active in Japan during the Bakumatsu period and early Meiji period. He was the eldest son of Japanologist Philipp Franz Balthasar von Siebold.

== Biography ==
After his father was deported from Japan in 1829, he settled in Leyden, in the Netherlands. He eventually married in Germany and had three sons and two daughters. After the signing of the Japan-Netherlands Commercial Agreement, one of the unequal treaties ending Japan’s national isolation policy in 1858, von Siebold returned to Japan in 1859, bringing the young Alexander with him. Living in Nagasaki, Alexander rapidly became fluent in the Japanese language. When his father obtained a position as a foreign advisor to the Tokugawa shogunate, father and son travelled to Edo (modern-day Tokyo). As father Von Siebold acted against the wishes of the Dutch government he was told to return to Java in 1861. Before his father left Japan, Alexander was engaged by the British representative Harry Parkes as a student interpreter because of his fluency in Japanese. Alexander assisted British consul Edward St. John Neale during the Anglo-Satsuma War and was based on the flagship HMS Euryalus (1853) during the conflict. He later accompanied the European task force during the Bombardment of Shimonoseki and the negotiations for opening the port of Hyogo to foreign settlement and trade in 1864.

When Tokugawa Akitake was sent to visit the 1867 World Fair in Paris, France, Alexander accompanied him. With the Meiji Restoration, Tokugawa Akitake was ordered back to Japan, but Alexander stayed on in Europe and returned to Japan a year later in 1869 as an advisor to the Empire of Austria-Hungary. He was subsequently ennobled with the title of baron by Franz Joseph I

In August 1870, he resigned from the British Consulate. However, the new Meiji government found use for his talents, and he was sent to London and subsequently to Frankfurt to make arrangements for Japanese students in those countries and to hire foreign advisors in all areas of expertise to come to Japan. He also arranged for Japan’s participation in the Vienna World Expo of 1873. He returned to Japan in November 1872, but was sent back to Europe again in February 1873 to late 1874 to render assistance to Sano Tsunetami.

In May 1875, he became official interpreter for the Ministry of Finance. On the death of his mother in 1877, he returned to the Netherlands on six months leave, but was ordered to visit the Exposition Universelle and to assist in commercial negotiations in Berlin. He returned to Japan in October 1881, but was sent back to Germany to assist Inoue Kaoru in Berlin in negotiations with the German government over treaty revisions in October 1881. The negotiations were protracted and ultimately unsuccessful; he left Berlin in 1882, moved to Rome in 1884, returned to Japan in 1885, and moved to London in 1892 to assist Aoki Shūzō in the successful conclusion of the 1894 Anglo-Japanese Treaty of Commerce and Navigation. In August 1910, he was awarded the Order of the Sacred Treasures (2nd class).

He died at Pegli on the French Riviera in January 1911.

His daughter Erika von Erhardt-Siebold was a literary scholar who specialised in Anglo-Saxon riddles.

In 1999, his diaries were published in three volumes (edited by Vera Schmidt) as Alexander von Siebold: Die Tagebücher.
