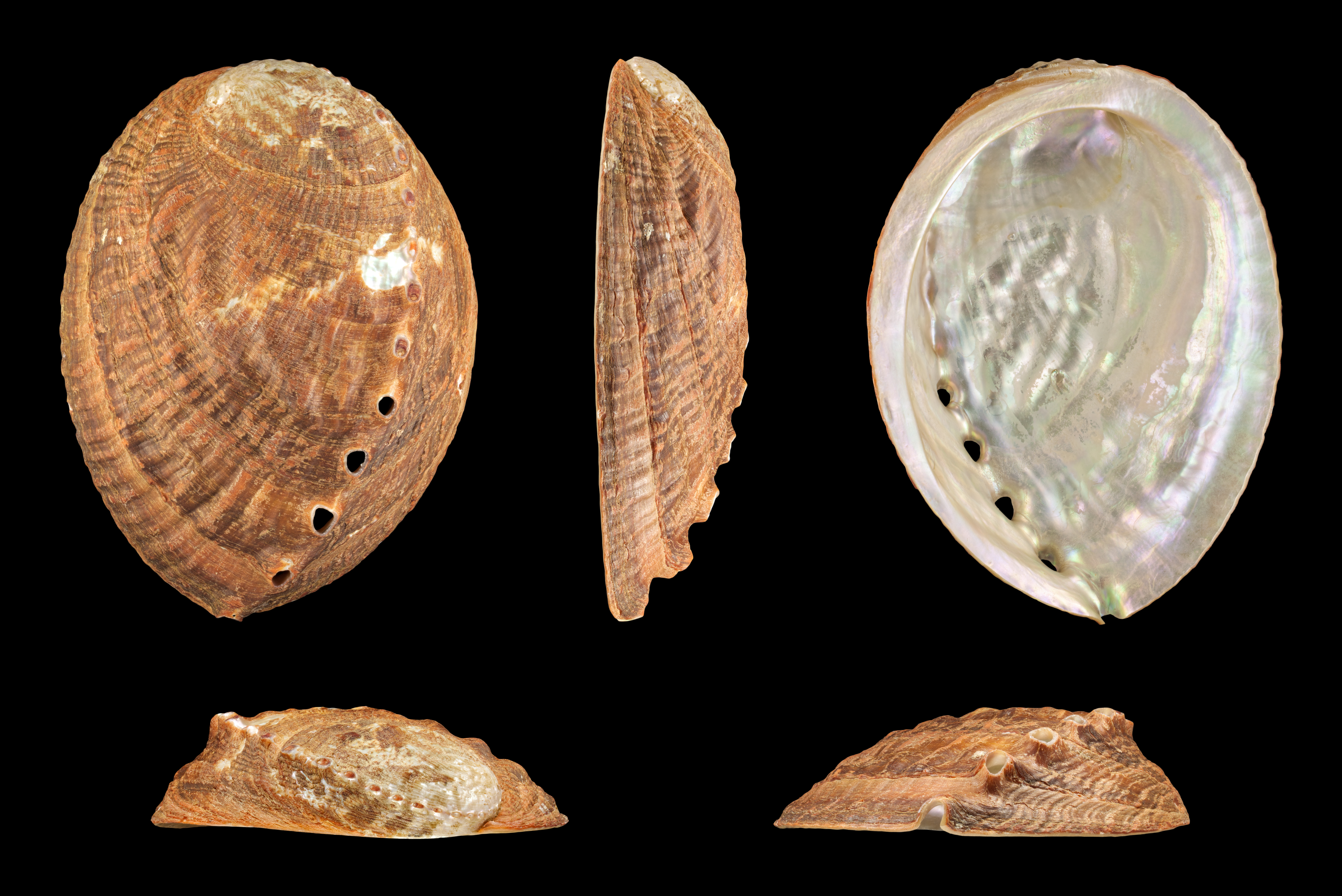
- Haliotis gigantea var. sieboldii

Conservation status
- Endangered (IUCN 3.1)

Scientific classification
- Kingdom: Animalia
- Phylum: Mollusca
- Class: Gastropoda
- Subclass: Vetigastropoda
- Order: Lepetellida
- Family: Haliotidae
- Genus: Haliotis
- Species: H. gigantea

Binomial name
- Haliotis gigantea Gmelin, 1791

Synonyms
- Haliotis (Sulculus) gigantea Gmelin, 1791; Haliotis sieboldii Reeve, 1846; Haliotis tubifera Lamarck, 1822; Haliotis gigas Röding, 1798; Haliotis gigantea Chemnitz, 1788

= Haliotis gigantea =

Species of gastropod

Haliotis gigantea, common name the giant abalone, is a species of sea snail, a marine gastropod mollusk in the family Haliotidae, the abalone. It is also known as Siebold's abalone, after Philipp Franz von Siebold.

== Description ==
The size of the shell varies between 80 mm and 200 mm. "The very large shell has a rounded-oval, quite convex shape. The distance of the apex measures from the margin between one-ninth and one-tenth the length of the shell. The surface of the shell shows coarse, low, unequal spiral cords and broad wave-like undulations. The typical form of this shell is one of the largest in the genus. It has a rounded-oval outline. The back of the shell is quite convex and highest in the middle. It is solid but not very thick,. The coloration is reddish-brown, radiately streaked more or less with chocolate and green. The spiral cords are low but strong. And there are irregular but very strong wavelike obliquely radiating folds above. The four open perforations are situated in high tubercles upon a strong dorsal angle, below which the left side slopes steeply to the columellar margin. This slope has low spiral cords, waved or festooned below the row of the holes, and it has also an obtuse ridge parallel with that row, not far below it. The spire is very small, quite low. Inside there are shallow spiral sulci and indentations at the positions of the cords and waves of the exterior. The nacre is light colored or silvery, to a high degree iridescent, reflections of emerald green and red predominating. The muscle attachment is smooth, but its posterior and lateral outlines are marked by a rugose line. The columellar plate is wide, its face concave, sloping inward."

The copepod Panaietis haliotis is ectoparasitic on this species.

== Distribution ==
H. gigantea is endemic to the waters off Japan and Korea.
