= Heinrich von Siebold =

Austrian collector, antiquary, japanologist (1852–1908)

Heinrich (Henry) Philipp von Siebold
- Born: 21 July 1852; Boppard, Germany
- Died: 11 August 1908 (aged 56); South Tyrol
- Occupations: antiquary, translator
- Parent(s): Philipp Franz von Siebold, Helene von Gagern
- Relatives: Alexander von Siebold, Kusumoto Ine, Tada

Heinrich Philipp von Siebold (21 July 1852 – 11 August 1908) was a German antiquary, collector and translator in the service of the Austrian Embassy in Tokyo.

== Life ==
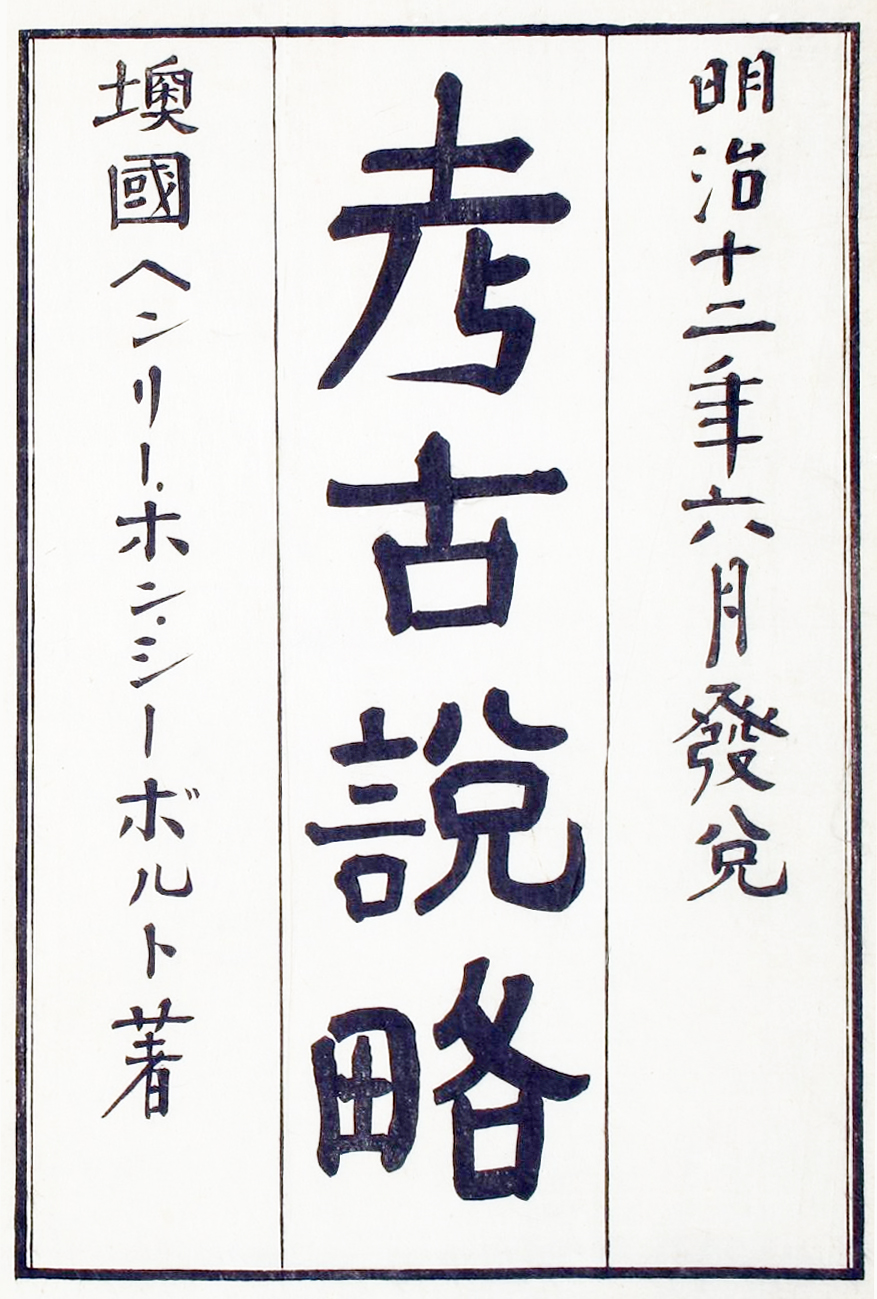
Kōko setsuryaku (1879)

The Siebolds were a family of renowned scholars from Würzburg, Germany. Heinrich was the second son of the famous German physician and pioneer of Japanese studies Philipp Franz von Siebold, who died in 1866. He was born in Boppard at the Rhine river and spent his youth in Bonn and Würzburg. In 1869, just 17, without finishing his Abitur (high-school degree) or any higher education, he arrived in Japan, a year after the political and cultural opening up of the country in the Meiji Era. After his arrival, Heinrich entered the diplomatic service of the Austrian-Hungarian embassy in Tokyo as dragoman. Like his father before him, he became one of the most distinguished German researchers on Japan. His antiquarian interest made him a vivid collector of Japanese ethnological items, art, and coins. Heinrich is credited with creating the Japanese-term for archaeology, "kōkogaku", via his 1879 book Kōko setsuryaku.

Heinrich married Hana Iwamoto (1851-1936) in Japan and had a son, Otto (1877-1902), and a daughter, Len (1879-1965). Len had four children from two marriages, and her descendants continue.

In 1899, he asked for early retirement due to his health. In the year before, he had married Euphemia Carpenter, the widow of a British officer. She bought Castle Freudenstein close to Bozen in South Tyrol, where they spent comfortably their last years surrounded by his rich collections. He was a well-recognized adviser in Far Eastern affairs, and a guide and translator for important visitors from Japan and China. Siebold served many of the European state visitors to whom he attended as a purchasing advisor, including the heir to the Austrian throne Franz Ferdinand when the latter visited Japan in 1893 during his world voyage.

On 11 August 1908 he died on Freudenstein Castle; his widow died shortly afterwards. In March 1909, his collections were sold in Vienna Au Mikado and dispersed in trade.

== Antiquarian interest in Japanese culture ==
Many Museums in Europe benefited from his collecting efforts in early Meiji Japan and from his generosity. In 1873, on the occasion of Japan's first participation at the World exhibition in Vienna, he donated collections of Japanese and Far Eastern coins to the Grand-Duke of Saxe-Weimar-Eisenach Carl Alexander, to the King of Württemberg and the Grand-Duke of Baden.

Carl Alexander deposited his collection with his Grand Ducal Oriental Coin Cabinet at Jena University. In the early 1880s, Siebold made arrangements with several German museums to collect for them. In 1883, he organized an exhibition of his collection in the Museum of Kunstgewerbe und Industrie in Vienna, a collection that he wanted to sell to the Austrian state, but his offer was rejected. Nevertheless, he later donated his collection to Vienna, where it is now an important part of the collections of the Kunsthistorisches Museum. In 1885, a second much larger collection of Far Eastern and Japanese coins charms and amulets assembled by Siebold, arrived at the Oriental Coin Cabinet Jena, where it is still preserved.
