= Kawahara Keiga =

Japanese painter

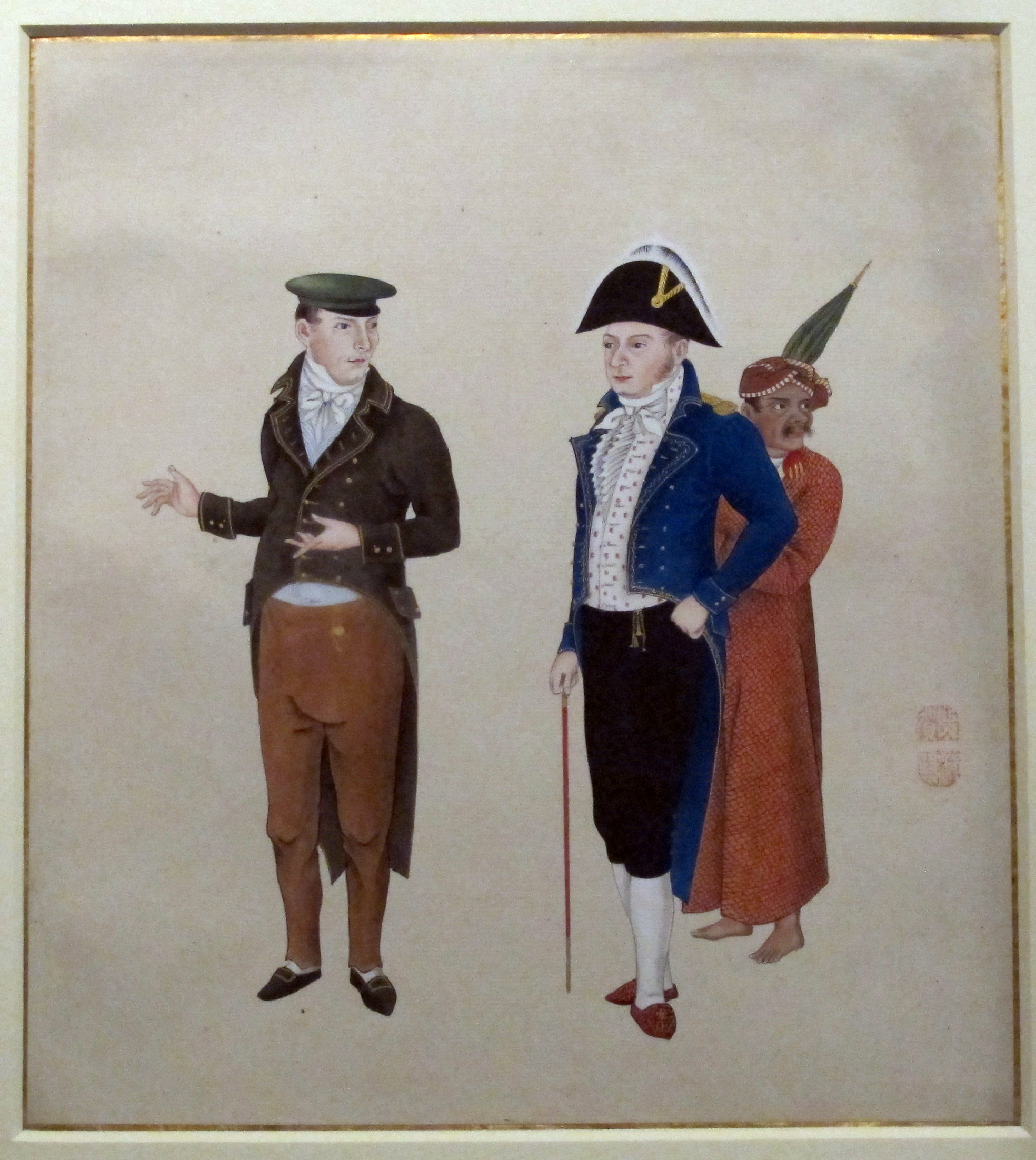
Dutchmen with a servant, Kawahara Keiga, around 1823-1826.

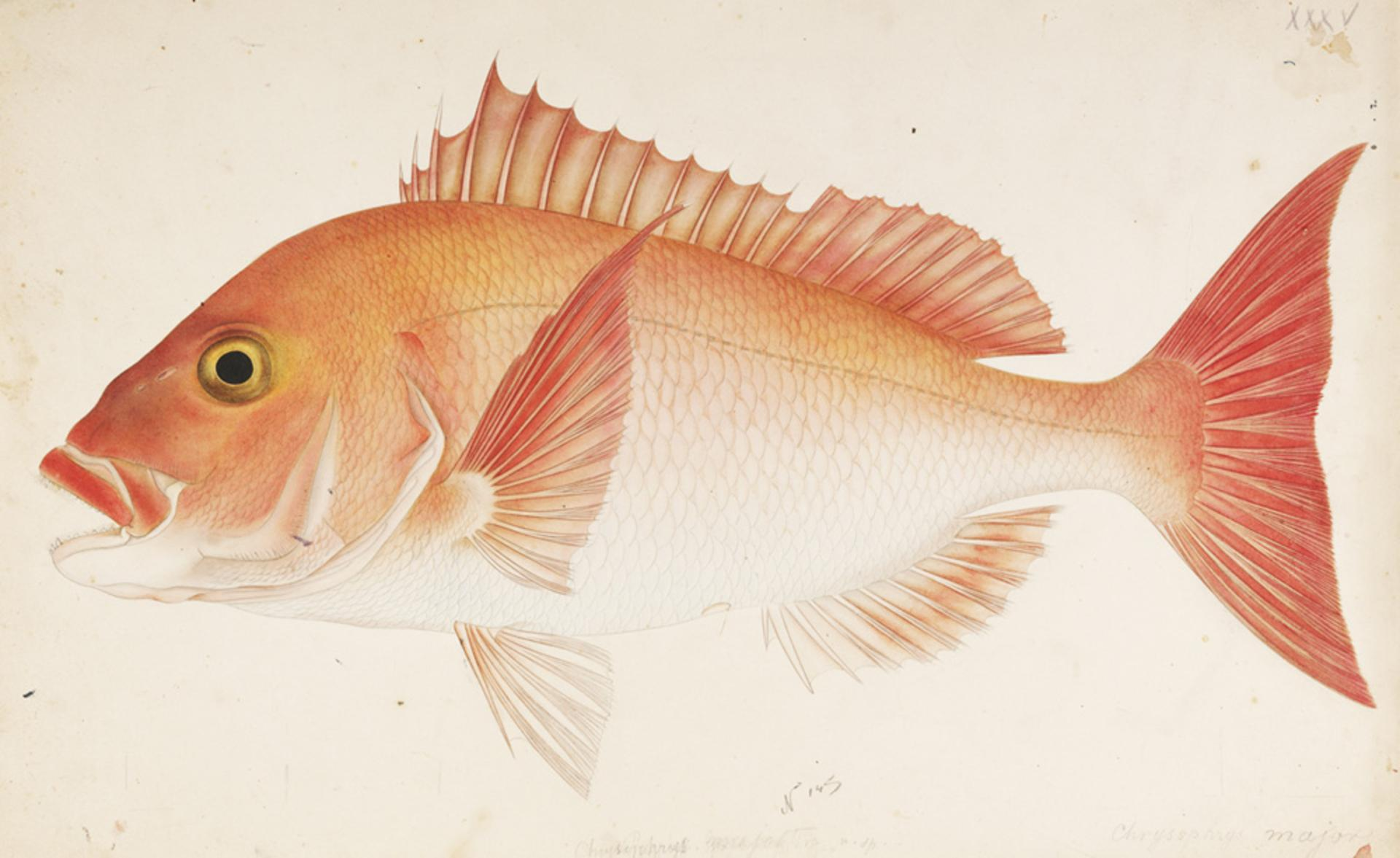
Pagrus major (Red seabream), by Kawahara Keiga, 1823-1829

Kawahara Keiga (Japanese: 川原慶賀, also known as Taguchi Takumi or Toyosuke, Nagasaki, 1786–1860?) was a late Edo period Japanese painter of plants, fishes, birds, reptiles, crustaceans, social scenes, landscapes and portraits at the Dutch Factory of Dejima, and at Edo, Kyoto and Nagasaki. His works can be found in museums in Japan (about a hundred works) and in the Netherlands (about a thousand), among others.

== Career ==
Kawahara was born in Nagasaki as the son of the painter Kawahara Kozan. He studied with the painter Yūshi Ishizaki (1768–1846). With special permission from the Japanese government, Kawahara worked as a painter at the Dutch factory of Dejima, Nagasaki, from 1811 to 1842. At the request of successive directors at Dejima, Kawahara documented many aspects of life of Japan in general and at Dejima in particular.

From 1823 to 1829, Kawahara drew and coloured detailed images of Japanese flora and fauna, at the behest of Dejima commander De Stürler and the physician and botanist Philipp Franz von Siebold. In 1825 Carl Hubert de Villeneuve (1800–1874) came to Dejima and taught Kawahara the fundamentals of Western painting techniques. As a result, Keiga introduced Western techniques in traditional Japanese painting. In 1826 he accompanied Von Siebold together with Heinrich Bürger and director (opperhoofd) De Stürler during his visit to the court at Edo, and documented many objects, street and court scenes. In 1829, he was imprisoned by the Tokugawa shogunate for involvement in a spying incident of Siebold, who was subsequently expelled from Japan.

In 1842, Kawahara was punished again, now for depicting the harbor of Nagasaki with family crests showing and therefore was dismissed from Nagasaki. In 1846 he put his signature on five ceiling paintings in the main hall of the Buddhist temple Wakimisaki Kannon (now in Wakimisakimachi, Nagasaki-shi, Nagasaki).

Kawahara's images have been fundamental for biological publications by Coenraad Jacob Temminck and Hermann Schlegel.

== Techniques ==
Kawahara used watercolor-coloured pencil drawing on paper for his biological work. For other works he also painted on silk and wood, like his paintings on the ceilings of several temples in Japan.

== Gallery of Kawahara's work ==
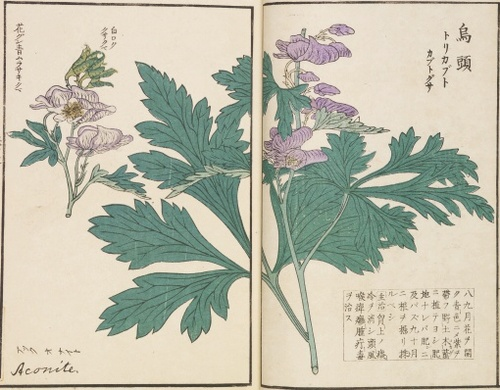
Carmichael’s Monkshood (Aconitum napellus, Aconitum carmichaelii, Aconitum japonicum subsp. napiforme?)

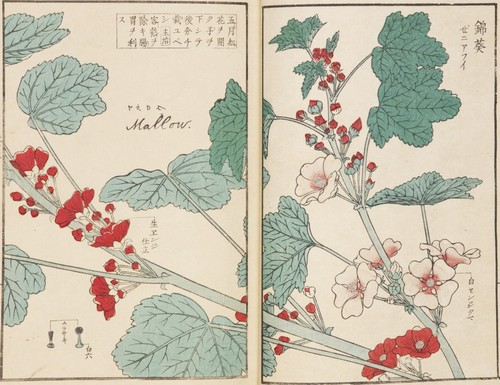
Common mallow (Malva sylvestris)

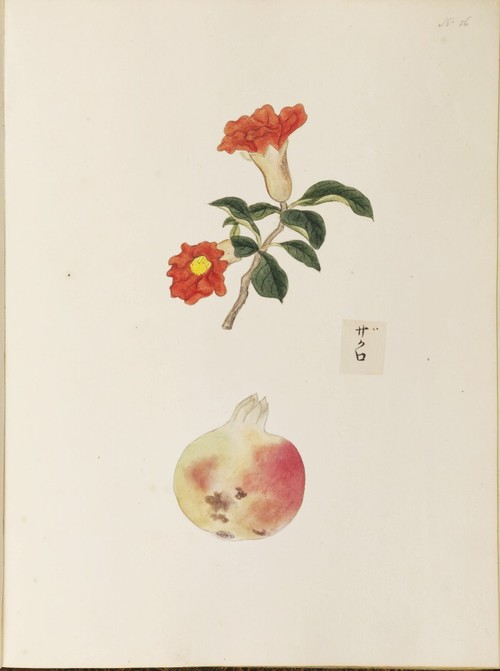
Pomegranate (Punica granatum)

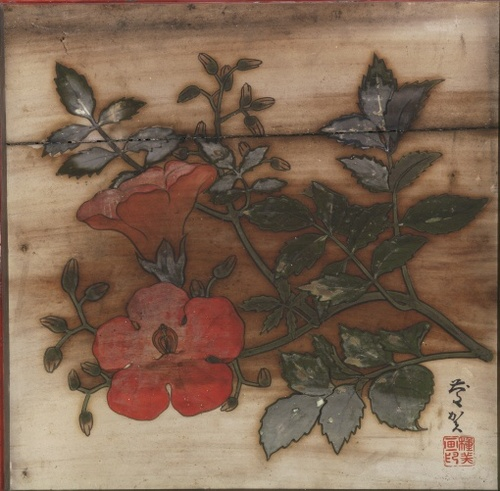
Ceiling painting of the Chinese Trumpet Vine (Campsis grandiflora), Kannonji Temple, Nagasaki

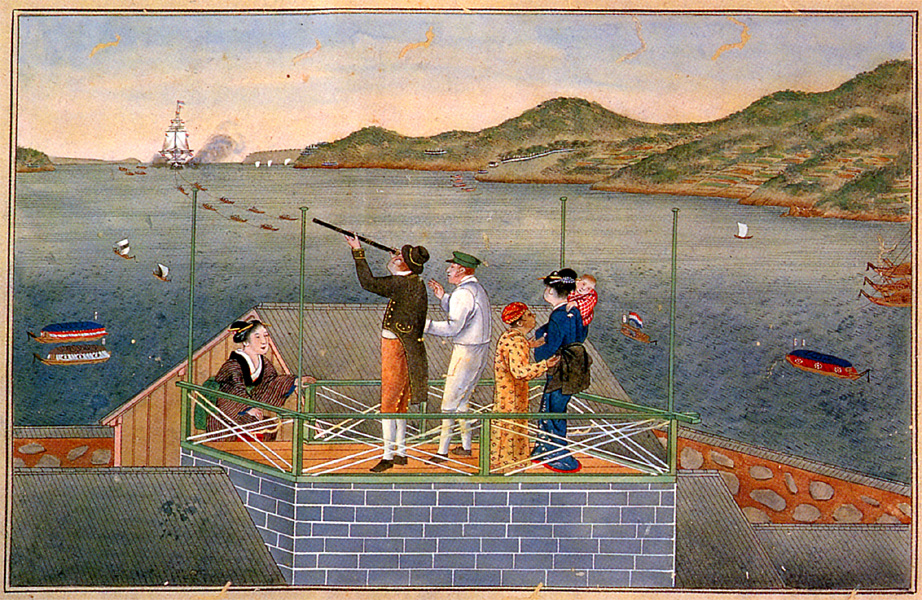
Siebold with his Japanese lover and baby-daughter Kusumoto Ine watching how rowing boats tow a Dutch ship into Nagasaki harbour, 1823-1829.

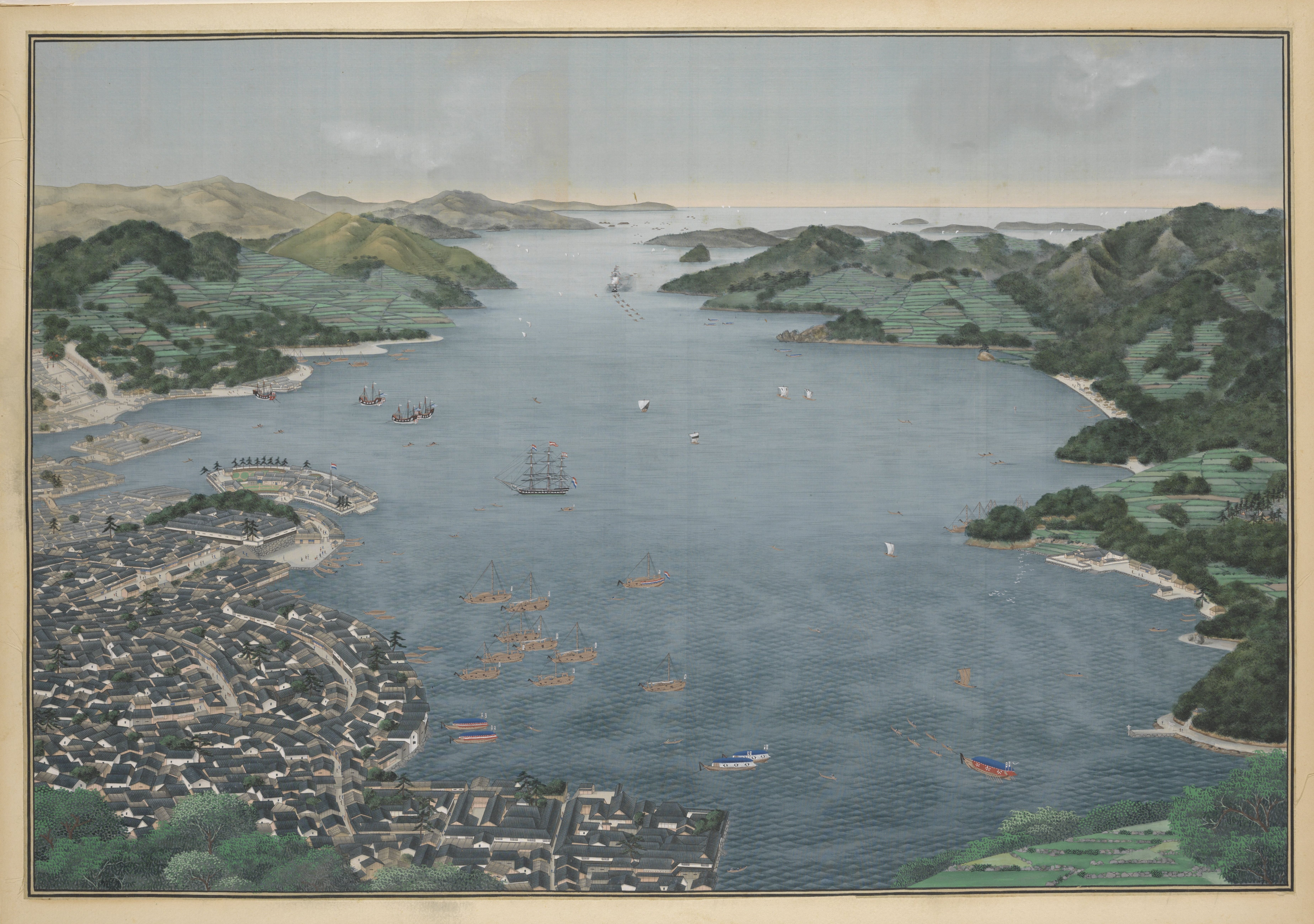
Bird's-eye view of the Nagasaki bay, with the island Dejima at mid-left

View of Dejima in Nagasaki Bay folding screen, c1836

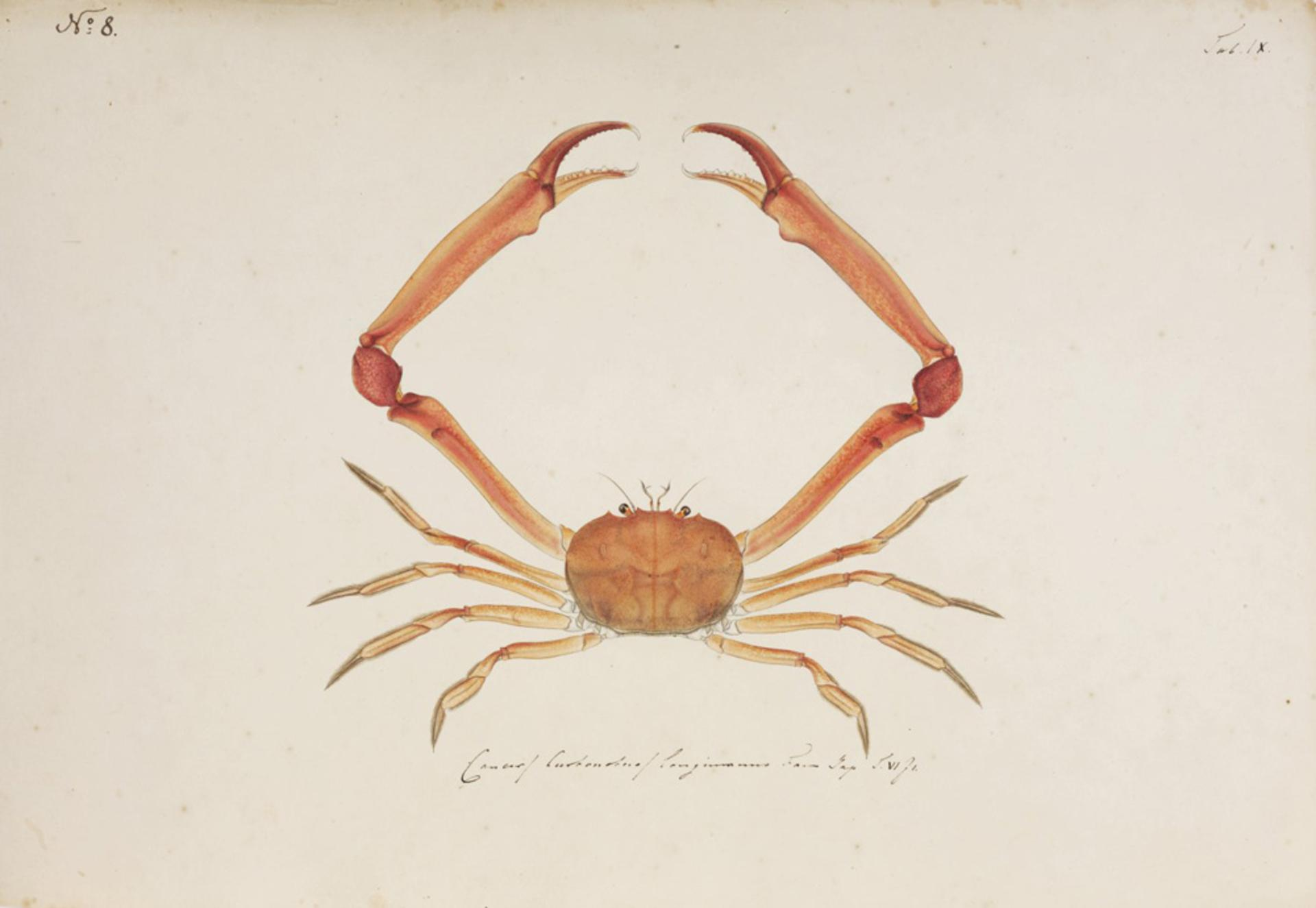
Carcinoplax longimana (De Haan, 1833)

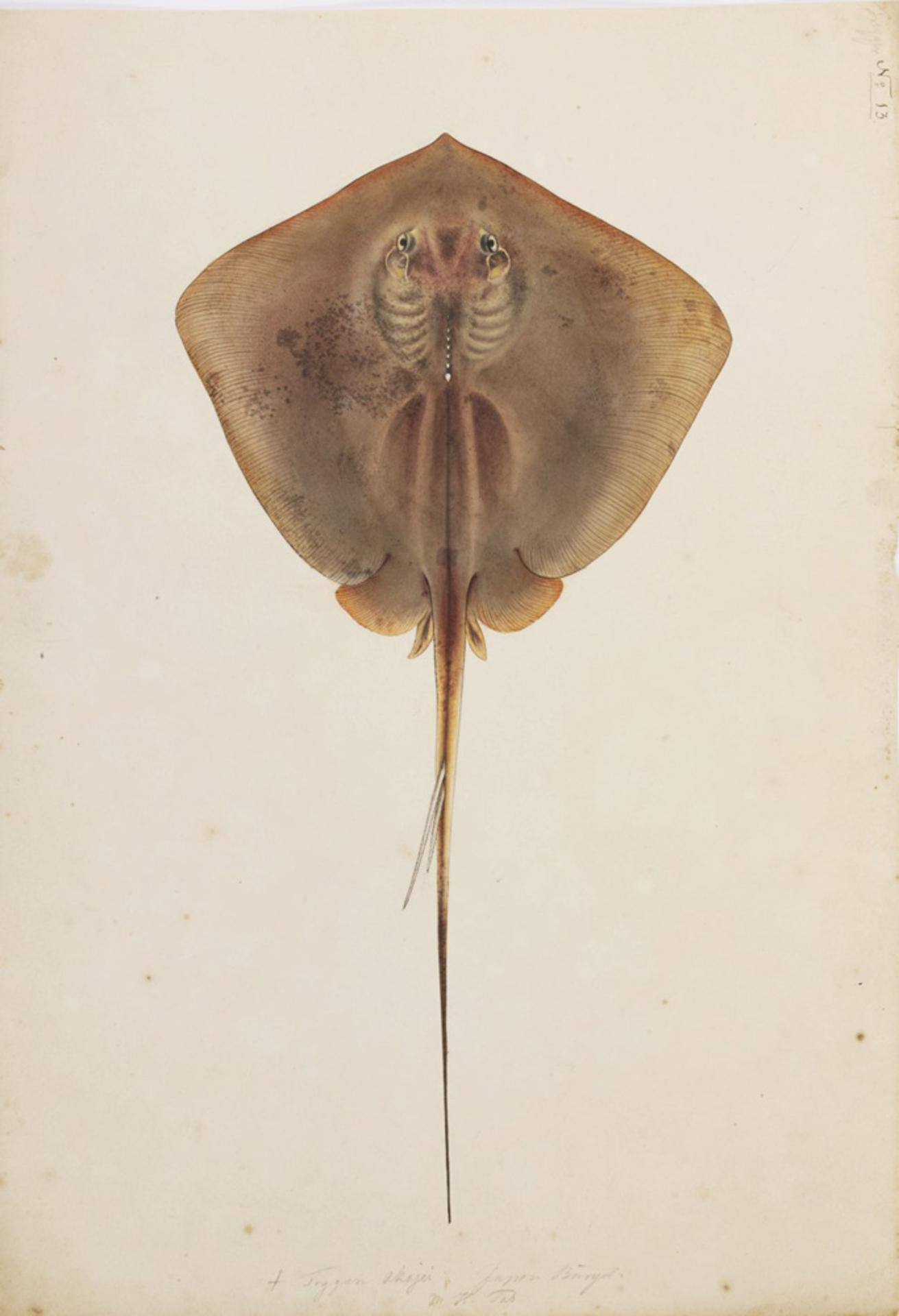
Pale-edged stingray (Dasyatis zugei)

== Museum collections with his work ==
For instance

- British Museum, London
- Fukuoka City Museum
- Nagasaki Museum of History and Culture
- Naturalis Biodiversity Center, Leiden
- SieboldHuis, Leiden
- Museum Volkenkunde, Leiden

== See also ==
- Ukiyo-e

== Sources ==
- Article Japanese Wikipedia
- Japanartsandcrafts.com Kawahara Keiga

== Other external links and literature ==
- O-jewel.tumblr.com: Kawahara's botanical art
- Oijen, M.J.P. van: A short history of the Siebold collection of Japanese Fishes in the National Museum of Natural History, Leiden, The Netherlands. Catalogue of the Aquatic world of von Siebold. Nagasaki Museum of History and Culture, 2007
- Forrer, Matthi: Kawahara Keiga, Rijksmuseum voor volkenkunde (Leyde, Pays-Bas), cop. 1987
- Kawahara Keiga: Picture book Vol.2 “botanical art”, Far East Amur adonis
