= Kusumoto Ine =

Japanese physician (1827-1903)

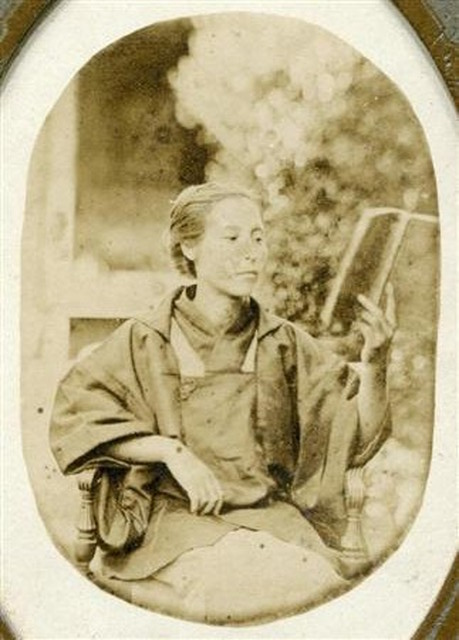
- Born: Shiimoto Ine; 31 May 1827; Nagasaki, Nagasaki, Tokugawa Shogunate
- Died: 27 August 1903 (aged 76); Tokyo, Empire of Japan
- Other names: O-Ine, Itoku
- Occupation: Physician
- Parents: Philipp Franz von Siebold; Kusumoto Taki
- Relatives: Alexander von Siebold, Heinrich von Siebold

Kusumoto Ine (楠本 イネ, 31 May 1827 – 27 August 1903; born Shiimoto Ine 失本 稲) was a Japanese physician. She was the first female doctor of Western medicine in Japan.

She was the daughter of Kusumoto Taki, who was a courtesan from Nagasaki; and the German physician Philipp Franz von Siebold, who worked on Dejima, an island to which foreigners were restricted during Japan's long period of seclusion from the world. Later in life she took the name Itoku (伊篤), and is often called Oranda O-Ine ("Dutch O-Ine") for her association with Dejima and its Dutch language-based Western learning.

Siebold was banished from Japan in 1829 but managed to provide for Ine and her mother and arranged for his students and associates to care for them. Ine's reputation grew after she became a doctor of Western medicine, and she won the patronage of the feudal lord Date Munenari. She studied in various parts of Japan under numerous teachers, one of whom impregnated her—likely having raped her—resulting in her only daughter; she never married. She settled in Tokyo after the country ended its seclusion, and assisted in the birth by one of Emperor Meiji's concubines in 1873. Since her death Ine has been the subject of novels, plays, comics, and musicals in Japan.

== Life and career ==
=== Early life ===
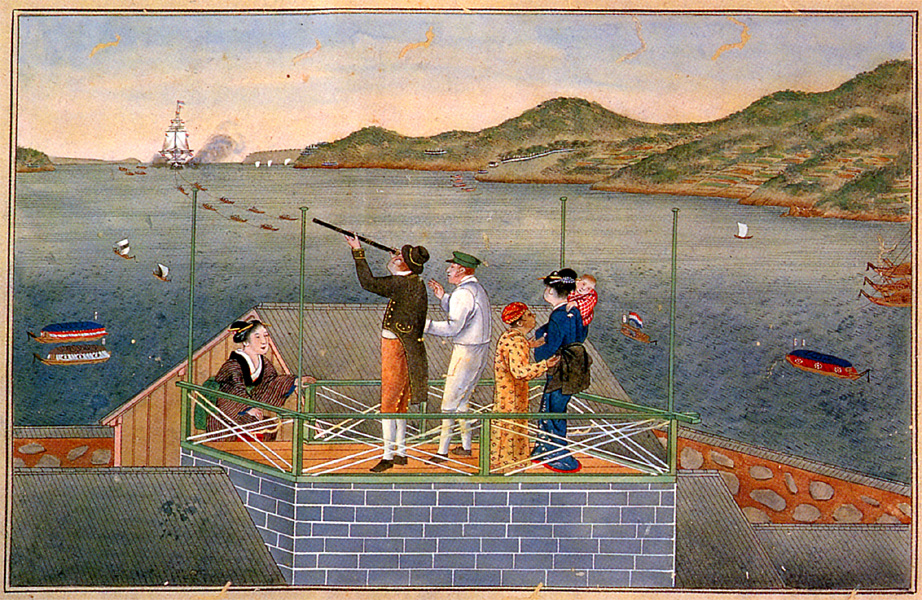
Arrival of a Dutch Ship by Kawahara Keiga, depicting Ine, Taki, and Siebold at Dejima

Shiimoto Ine was born on 31 May 1827 (Note: By the Japanese calendar she was born on the sixth day of the fifth month of the tenth year of Bunsei. An announcement was made that she was born the following day, apparently for official purposes to establish that she was born in the brothel her mother was associated with in Nagasaki, and not on the island of Dejima.) in the city of Nagasaki. The surname Shiimoto came from a Japanese rendering of the surname of her German father, the physician Philipp Franz von Siebold, who was living on Dejima, an artificial island off Nagasaki to where foreign trade was restricted during the more than two centuries of Japan's near-total self-seclusion from the world. There he played a role in introducing Western medical techniques to Japan. Ine's mother was Kusumoto Taki, (Note: 楠本 滝 Kusumoto Taki; she also went by the name Sonoōgi (其扇).) a courtesan (Note: Taki may not have worked as a courtesan before she was assigned to Siebold, who insisted on a virgin for fear of catching syphilis. Taki's official papers bore a courtesan's stamp, allowing her access to Siebold in Dejima. Siebold told his mother Taki came from a noble family.) sent at 16 from the Nagasaki pleasure district Maruyama in 1823 to be Siebold's concubine. (Note: Courtesans sent to Dejima were called orandayuki yūjo, or "Dutch-going courtesans", as Dejima was associated with Dutch traders.)

Ine lived with her parents on Dejima until Siebold was banished on 22 October 1829 for allegedly exporting restricted information illicitly gathered from the geographer Takahashi Kageyasu. He was accused of smuggling items including maps which it was believed could fall into the hands of Japan's enemies, such as Russia, which posed a threat on Japan's northern borders. Taki and the two-year-old Ine were not permitted to leave Japan; (Note: Government edicts prohibited mixed-race children, as well as full-blooded Japanese, from leaving Japan; the edicts also required the foreign father to provide for the child's financial support and education.) they waved him goodbye from a small boat in the harbour as his ship left. Taki soon after married a man named Wasaburō. (Note: 和三郎 Wasaburō)

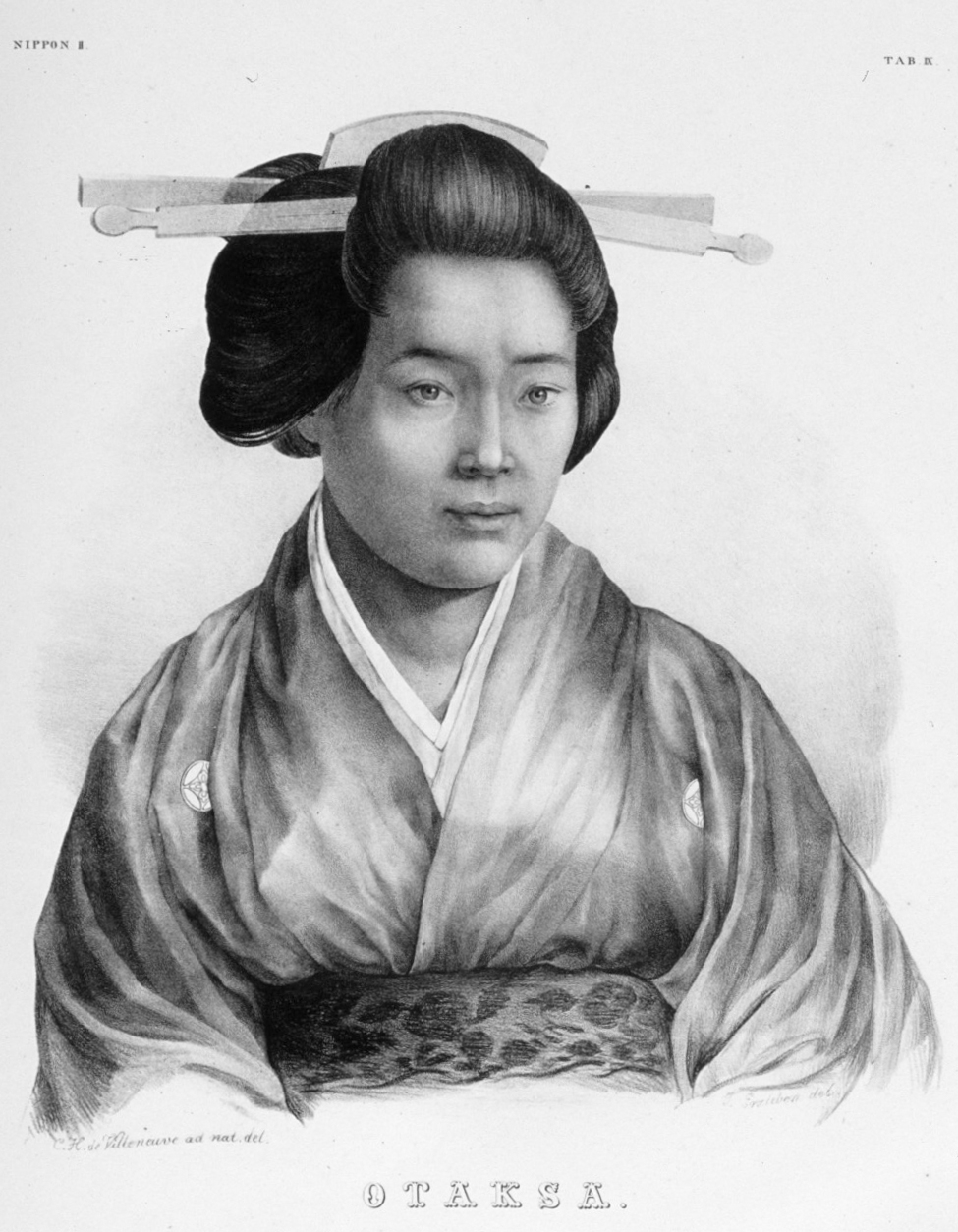
Portrait of Ine's mother Kusumoto Taki, c. 1830s

The wealthy Siebold left Taki and Ine with a stockpile of valuable sugar to support themselves and arranged for his associates to watch over them. Being part of a close-knit medical dynasty, it is likely Siebold was aware of the academic medicial training female members of his own family such as Regina von Siebold or Charlotte von Siebold were receiving at home in Europe, possibly influencing his own support of Ine's studies. He sent Ine books of Dutch grammar, important for Western studies at the time in Japan, and students of Siebold's contributed to her education. An apocryphal story tells of Ine running away at age 14 or 15 to study medicine with one of them, Ninomiya Keisaku, in Uwajima Domain, where he had been placed under house arrest for his involvement in the Siebold Affair.

=== Education and early career ===
Ine's medical training got an official start in 1845 when she began studying obstetrics in Okayama Domain under another of Siebold's students, Ishii Sōken, (Note: At the time such an apprenticeship typically lasted seven to ten years and included household duties in the teacher's household.) through the introduction of Ninomiya Keisaku. She cut her studies with Sōken short when in 1851 he impregnated her. She returned to Nagasaki, where she gave birth in 1852 to a daughter, whom she named Tada, meaning "free", symbolizing that heaven had granted her this child "for free". Her account of her mother's life is amongst those that assert Ine's pregnancy resulted from Sōken having raped her. Ine was to rebuff Sōken's attempts to become involved in Tada's life.

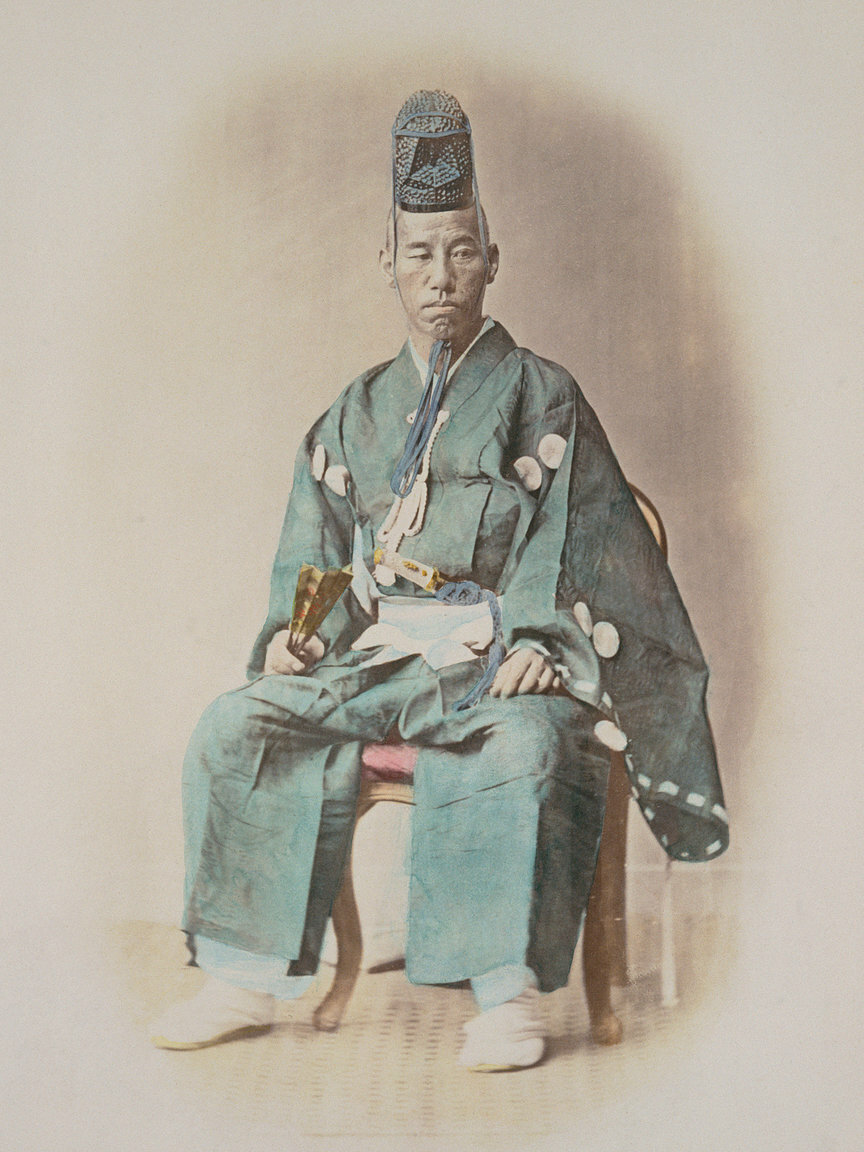
The feudal lord Date Munenari was a patron of Ine's and of Western learning.

Ine continued her studies in Nagasaki under Abe Roan. (Note: Abe Roan 阿部魯庵, who had studied Western medicine under Abe Shūsuke.) In 1854 she left Tada with her mother and went with Ninomiya Keisaku's nephew Mise Shūzō to study under Keisaku in Uwajima, whose lord, the daimyō Date Munenari, enthusiastically promoted Western learning. After he suffered a stroke in 1856, Keisaku returned to Nagasaki with Ine and Shūzō.

Japan's seclusion came to an end in 1854 and in 1859 Nagasaki was opened as a treaty port and the Dutch abandoned Dejima for a consulate in the capital city Edo (modern Tokyo). Siebold received a pardon and returned to Nagasaki 4 August (Note: The sixth day of the seventh month of the year of Ansei, according to the Japanese calendar) that year with his 13-year-old son Alexander, from his German marriage. Shūzō became Siebold's student, translator, and personal assistant, and Alexander's Japanese teacher. Ine lived at first in her father's house, but the relationship was strained, in part over her command of Dutch, and in part over Siebold's impregnating a maid; Ine soon moved out. She worked closely with Shūzō, who assisted her communications with his advanced Dutch ability. Her father's reputation helped her gain patients of her own. In April 1862 Siebold was made to return to Europe again and never returned to Japan.

Ine continued to learn from Dutch physicians in the Nagasaki community such as J. L. C. Pompe van Meerdervoort, who lauded her skills in print. Van Meerdervoort founded in 1861 the first Western-style hospital and medical school in Japan, the Nagasaki Yōjōsho, with the support of the military government, and Ine attended classes in the women's ward and assisted in operations there. She was the first woman in Japan to witness the dissection of a human corpse, carried out by Van Meerdervoort.

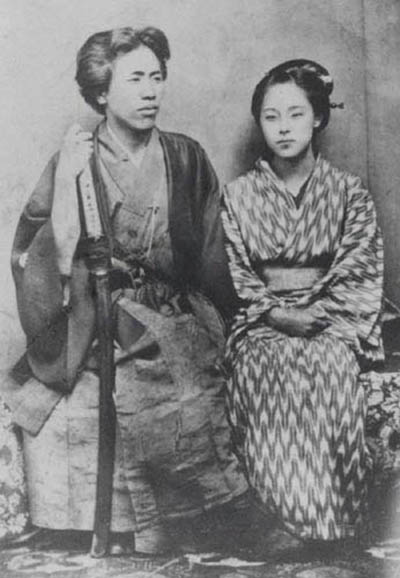
Kusumoto Takako (right) and her husband Mise Shūzō (left)

Her reputation and connections in the Western-learning community won Ine the patronage of Date Munenari, whose favour extended to her daughter, now named Takako. As her mixed German–Japanese blood could lead her to suffer discrimination, Munenari had her change her name to Kusumoto Itoku. (Note: 楠本 伊篤 Kusumoto Itoku) He extended a modest official rice stipend to Ine, and she was expected to be ready to serve in the women's quarters at the castle; she was one of three doctors present when Munenari's wife Yoshiko gave birth in 1867. Ine had a busy practice in Uwajima and made frequent travel between Nagasaki and Uwajima during the 1860s. Munenari made effort on behalf of her father and Shūzō, who were arrested in 1861 in Edo by anti-foreign factions. Shūzō was released in 1865 and returned to Uwajima, where in 1866 he married Takako.

Ine's mother died in 1869. About this time Ine studied obstetrics in Nagasaki with Antonius Bauduin, who pioneered ovariotomy there and was appointed to the Tōkō national medical school in Tokyo, which had just been renamed from Edo and where the Emperor had moved after his restoration. After other moves Ine also settled in Tokyo. There she became acquainted with Takako's half-brother Ishii Kendō, (Note: 石井謙道 Ishii Kendō, 1840–1882) the son of Ishii Sōken. Ine maintained contact in Tokyo with her half-brother Alexander, who worked for the British legation, and another half-brother Heinrich, who had worked there as an interpreter for the Austro-Hungarian legation since 1869.

=== Later career and death ===
Kendō and Shūzō won prestigious appointments in the capital, and in 1873, through her connections with Fukuzawa Yukichi and other scholars of the West, she attended the birth of the child of Emperor Meiji's concubine Hamuro Mitsuko; the child was stillborn and Mitsuko died four days later. Ine received the considerable sum of 100 yen for her effort. Shūzō and Takako moved to Osaka in 1876, where Shūzō worked for the Osaka Hospital. In 1877 he became sick and died there. Takako became pregnant from an acquaintance and gave birth to a boy in 1879, whom Ine adopted as her heir and named Shūzō. Takako married the doctor Yamawaki Taisuke, with whom she had a further three children before his death in 1886.

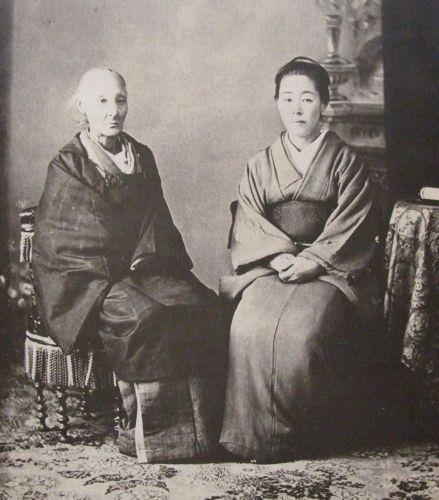
Ine Kusumoto in old age with Takako (Tada)

Ine returned to Nagasaki, where she earned her midwife's license in 1884. She returned to Tokyo in 1889 and may have retired by 1895, at which time the family moved into a Western-style house Heinrich had had built in Azabu. She died there on 27 August 1903 after eating freshwater eel and watermelon, which are said to have given her food poisoning. She enjoyed the social support of the Western-style medical and scholarly communities, the high regard of her students and fellow practitioners, and the financial support of her father.

Ine was said to have had fair skin, slightly curly brown hair, and blue eyes. She never married. In later life she preferred not to reveal her mixed ancestry.

== Legacy ==
Ine appears as a leading character in the novels Kashin (1972) by Ryōtarō Shiba and Akira Yoshimura's Von Siebold no Musume (1979; translated by Richard Rubinger as Siebold's Daughter (2016)), and in the television dramas Oranda no Ine ("Ine of Holland") in 1970, Kashin in 1977 (based on Shiba's novel), and O-Ine: Chichi no na wa Siebold (Note: 『おいね 父の名はシーボルト』 O-Ine: Chichi no na wa Siebold) ("O-Ine: Her Father's Name is Siebold") in 2000. Musicals based on Ine's life include Bakumatsu Gāru: Dokutoru O-Ine Monogatari ("Bakumatsu Girl: The Tale of Doktor O-Ine"), (Note: 『幕末ガール～ドクトル★おイネ物語』 Bakumatsu Gāru: Dokutoru O-Ine Monogatari) which opened in Ehime in 2012.

A volume written by Keiko Hamada and illustrated by Takashi Yorimitsu titled Nihon de Hajimete no Joi: Kusumoto Ine ("The First Woman Doctor in Japan: Kusumoto Ine") (Note: 日本ではじめての女医―楠本いね Hajimete no Joi: Kusumoto Ine) appeared in 1992 as part of the Denki: Ningen ni Manabō ("Biography: Learn from People") (Note: 伝記 人間にまなぼう Denki: Ningen ni Manabō, "Biography: Learn from People") series of biographies for youths. The cartoonist Maki Masaki adapted Ine's story to comics in Siebold O-Ine in 1995; Masaki depicts Ine with red-tinted hair and focuses the story on Ine's strength of will in the face of the trials she underwent both as a female medical student and an ainoko (合いの子), a derogatory term for a mixed-race child.

She appears in the manga Jin, as one of the doctors recommended to Jin to teach Western medicine.

== See also ==
- Kei Okami, first Japanese woman to obtain a degree in Western medicine from a Western university.
- Ogino Ginko, first licensed female physician in Japan.
- Honorific speech in Japanese#Female names
