= Seybold =

Seybold is a surname. Notable people with the surname include:

- John States Seybold (1897–1984), Governor of the Panama Canal Zone from 1952 to 1956
- John W. Seybold (1916–2004), the father of computer typesetting
- Natalie Seybold (born 1965), American former pair skater
- Patricia Seybold, CEO of Patricia Seybold Group
- Socks Seybold (1870–1921), baseball player
- Wayne Seybold (born 1963), American pair skater and politician
- Christian Friedrich Seybold (1859 – 1921), German scholar of Oriental languages and tutor to Pedro II of Brazil

== See also ==
- Seybold Building and Arcade located in Downtown Miami, Florida
- Kelsey-Seybold Clinic, large multi-specialty clinic system located in Greater Houston
- Seybold Baking Company Factory, historic building at 800 Orange Avenue in Daytona Beach
- Seybold Seminars, seminar and trade show for the desktop publishing and pre-press industry
- Sebold (disambiguation)
- Seibold
