= Dave Winer =

American software developer, entrepreneur and writer (born 1955)

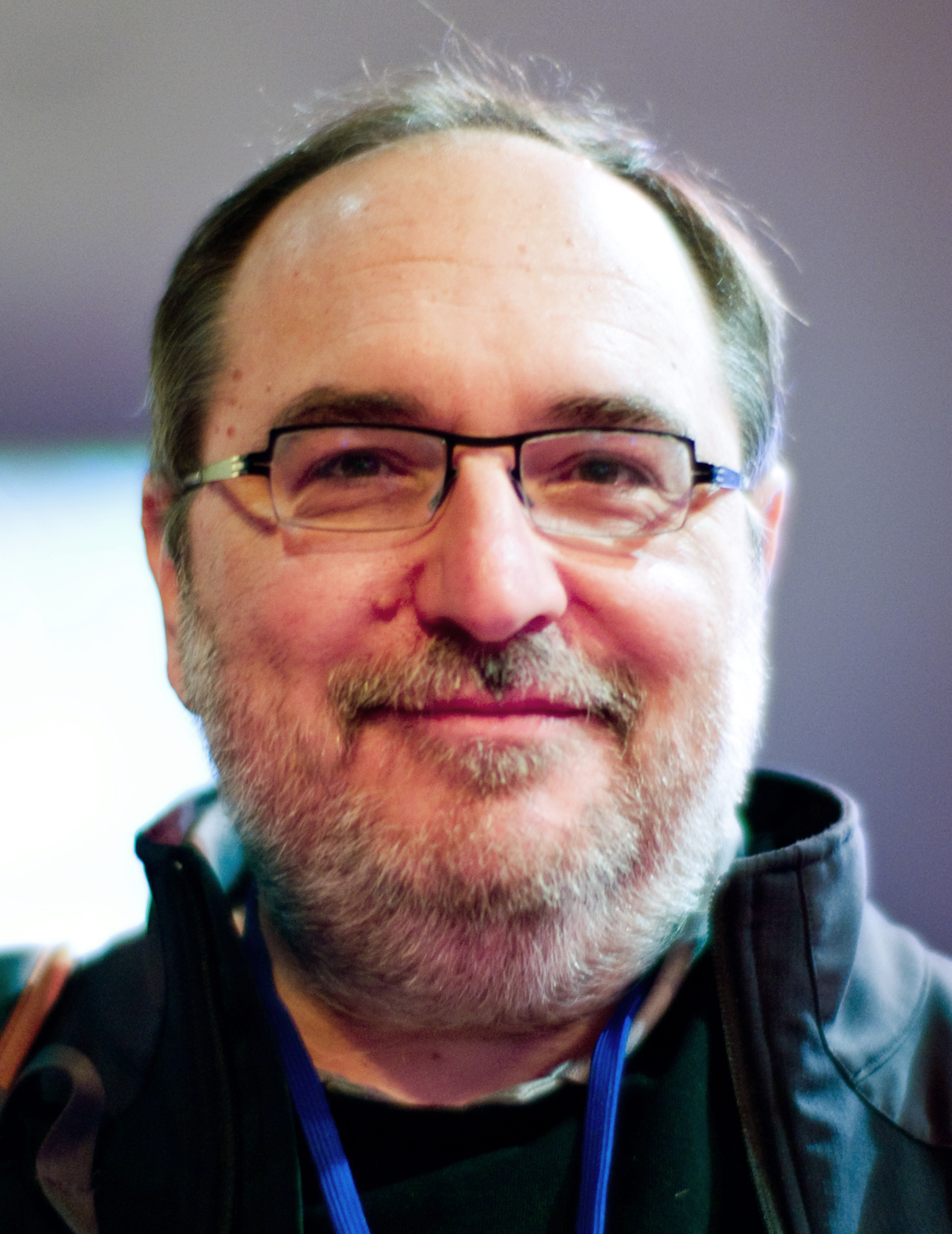
- Dave Winer circa 2007
- Born: May 2, 1955 (age 71); Queens, New York City, U.S.
- Education: Bronx High School of Science
- Alma mater: Tulane University (BA); University of Wisconsin-Madison (MS)
- Known for: Outliners; Blogging; RSS; Podcasting
- Dave Winer's voice recorded October 2012

Dave Winer (born May 2, 1955, in Queens, New York City) is an American software developer, entrepreneur, and writer who resides in New York City. Winer is noted for his contributions to outliners, scripting, content management, and web services, as well as blogging and podcasting. He is the founder of the software companies Living Videotext, Userland Software and Small Picture Inc., a former contributing editor for the Web magazine HotWired, the author of the Scripting News weblog, a former research fellow at Harvard Law School, and current visiting scholar at New York University's Arthur L. Carter Journalism Institute.

== Early life and education ==
Winer was born on May 2, 1955, in Queens, New York City, the son of Eve Winer, PhD, a school psychologist, and Leon Winer, PhD, a former professor of the Columbia University Graduate School of Business. Winer is also the grandnephew of German novelist Arno Schmidt and a relative of Hedy Lamarr. He graduated from the Bronx High School of Science in 1972. Winer received a BA in Mathematics from Tulane University in New Orleans in 1976. In 1978 he received an MS in Computer Science from the University of Wisconsin–Madison.

== Career ==
=== Early work in outliners ===
In 1979 Dave Winer became an employee of Personal Software, where he worked on his own product idea named VisiText, which was his first attempt to build a commercial product around an "expand and collapse" outline display and which ultimately established outliners as a software product. In 1981 he left the company and founded Living Videotext to develop this still-unfinished product. The company was based in Mountain View, CA, and grew to more than 50 employees.

ThinkTank, which was based on VisiText, was released in 1983 for Apple II and was promoted as an "idea processor." It became the "first popular outline processor, the one that made the term generic." A ThinkTank release for the IBM PC followed in 1984, as well as releases for the Macintosh 128K and 512K. Ready, a RAM resident outliner for the IBM PC released in 1985, was commercially successful but soon succumbed to the competing Sidekick product by Borland. MORE, released for Apple's Macintosh in 1986, combined an outliner and a presentation program. It became "uncontested in the marketplace" and won the MacUser's Editor's Choice Award for "Best Product" in 1986.

In 1987, at the height of the company's success, Winer sold Living Videotext to Symantec for an undisclosed but substantial transfer of stock that "made his fortune." Winer continued to work at Symantec's Living Videotext division, but after six months he left the company in pursuit of other challenges.

=== Years at UserLand ===
Winer founded UserLand Software in 1988 and served as the company's CEO until 2002.

UserLand's original flagship product, Frontier, was a system-level scripting environment for the Mac. Winer's pioneering weblog, Scripting News, takes its name from this early interest. Frontier was an outliner-based scripting language, echoing Winer's longstanding interest in outliners and anticipating code-folding editors of the late 1990s. Winer became interested in web publishing while helping automate the production process of the strikers' online newspaper during San Francisco's newspaper strike of November 1994, According to Newsweek, through this experience, he "revolutionized Net publishing." Winer subsequently shifted the company's focus to online publishing products, enthusiastically promoting and experimenting with these products while building his websites and developing new features. One of these products was Frontier's NewsPage Suite of 1997, which supported the publication of Winer's Scripting News and was adopted by a handful of users who "began playing around with their own sites in the Scripting News vein." These users included notably Chris Gulker and Jorn Barger, who envisaged blogging as a networked practice among users of the software.

Winer was named a Seybold Fellow in 1997, to assist the executives and editors that comprised the Seybold Institute in ensuring "the highest quality and topicality" in their educational program, the Seybold Seminars; the honor was bestowed for his "pioneering work in web-based publishing systems." Keen to enter the "competitive arena of high-end Web development," Winer then came to collaborate with Microsoft and jointly developed the XML-RPC protocol. This led to the creation of SOAP, which he co-authored with Microsoft's Don Box, Bob Atkinson, and Mohsen Al-Ghosein.

In December 1997, acting on the desire to "offer much more timely information," Winer designed and implemented an XML syndication format for use on his Scripting News weblog, thus making an early contribution to the history of web syndication technology. By December 2000, competing dialects of RSS included several varieties of Netscape's RSS, Winer's RSS 0.92, and an RDF-based RSS 1.0. Winer continued to develop the branch of the RSS fork originating from RSS 0.92, releasing in 2002 a version called RSS 2.0. Winer's advocacy of web syndication in general and RSS 2.0 in particular convinced many news organizations to syndicate their news content in that format. For example, in early 2002 The New York Times entered an agreement with UserLand to syndicate many of their articles in RSS 2.0 format. Winer resisted calls by technologists to have the shortcomings of RSS 2.0 improved. Instead, he froze the format and turned its ownership over to Harvard University.

With products and services based on UserLand's Frontier system, Winer became a leader in blogging tools from 1999 onward, as well as a "leading evangelist of weblogs." In 2000 Winer developed the Outline Processor Markup Language OPML, an XML format for outlines, which originally served as the native file format for Radio UserLand's outliner application and has since been adopted for other uses, the most common being to exchange lists of web feeds between web feed aggregators. UserLand was the first to add an "enclosure" tag in its RSS, modifying its blog software and its aggregator so that bloggers could easily link to an audio file (see podcasting and history of podcasting).

In February 2002 Winer was named one of the "Top Ten Technology Innovators" by InfoWorld.

In June 2002 Winer underwent life-saving bypass surgery to prevent a heart attack and as a consequence stepped down as CEO of UserLand shortly after. He remained the firm's majority shareholder, however, and claimed personal ownership of Weblogs.com.

=== Writer ===
As "one of the most prolific content generators in Web history," Winer has enjoyed a long career as a writer and has come to be counted among Silicon Valley's "most influential web voices."

Winer started DaveNet, "a stream-of-consciousness newsletter distributed by e-mail" in November 1994 and maintained Web archives of the "goofy and informative" 800-word essays since January 1995, which earned him a Cool Site of the Day award in March 1995. From the start, the "Internet newsletter" DaveNet was widely read among industry leaders and analysts, who experienced it as a "real community." Dissatisfied with the quality of the coverage that the Mac and, especially, his own Frontier software received in the trade press, Winer saw DaveNet as an opportunity to "bypass" the conventional news channels of the software business. Satisfied with his success, he "reveled in the new direct email line he had established with his colleagues and peers, and in his ability to circumvent the media." In the early years, Winer often used DaveNet to vent his grievances against Apple's management, and as a consequence of his strident criticism came to be seen as "the most notorious of the disgruntled Apple developers." Redacted DaveNet columns were published weekly by the web magazine HotWired between June 1995 and May 1996. DaveNet was discontinued in 2004.

Winer's Scripting News, described as "one of the [web's] oldest blogs," launched in February 1997 and earned him titles such as "protoblogger" and "forefather of blogging." Scripting News started as "a home for links, offhand observations, and ephemera" and allowed Winer to mix "his roles as a widely read pundit and an ambitious entrepreneur." Offering an "as-it-happened portrait of the work of writing software for the Web in the 1990s," the site became an "established must-read for industry insiders." Scripting News continues to be updated regularly.

=== Visiting scholar positions ===
Winer spent one year as a resident fellow at the Harvard Law School's Berkman Center for Internet & Society, where he worked on using weblogs in education. While there, he launched Weblogs at Harvard Law School using UserLand software, and held the first BloggerCon conferences. Winer's fellowship ended in June 2004.

In 2010 Winer was appointed visiting scholar at New York University's Arthur L. Carter Journalism Institute.

=== Return to outliners ===
On December 19, 2012, Winer co-founded Small Picture, Inc. with Kyle Shank; Small Picture is a corporation that builds two outlining products, Little Outliner and Fargo. Little Outliner, an entry-level outliner designed to teach new users about outliners, which launched on March 25, 2013. Fargo, the company's "primary product", launched less than a month later, on April 17, 2013. Fargo is a free browser-based outliner which syncs with a user's Dropbox account. Small Picture has stated that in future it may offer paid-for services to Fargo users. Fargo was retired at the end of September 2017.

== Projects and activities ==
=== 24 Hours of Democracy ===
In February 1996, while working as a columnist for HotWired, Winer organized 24 Hours of Democracy, an online protest against the recently passed Communications Decency Act. As part of the protest, over 1,000 people, among them Microsoft chairman Bill Gates, posted essays to the Web on the subject of democracy, civil liberty and freedom of speech.

=== Edit This Page ===
In December 1999, Winer became the "proprietor of a growing free blog service" at EditThisPage.com, hosting "approximately 20,000 sites" in February 2001. The service closed in December 2005.

=== Podcasting ===
Winer has been given "credit for the invention of the podcasting model." Having received user requests for audioblogging features since October 2000, especially from Adam Curry, Winer decided to include new functionality in RSS 0.92 by defining a new element called "enclosure," which would pass the address of a media file to the RSS aggregator. He demonstrated the RSS enclosure feature on January 11, 2001, by enclosing a Grateful Dead song in his Scripting News weblog.

Winer's weblogging product, Radio Userland, the program favored by Curry, had a built-in aggregator and thus provided both the "send" and "receive" components of what was then called audioblogging. In July 2003 Winer challenged other aggregator developers to provide support for enclosures. In October 2003, Kevin Marks demonstrated a script to download RSS enclosures and pass them to iTunes for transfer to an iPod. Curry then offered an RSS-to-iPod script that moved MP3 files from Radio UserLand to iTunes. The term "podcasting" was suggested by Ben Hammersley in February 2004.

Winer also has an occasional podcast, Morning Coffee Notes, which has featured guests such as Doc Searls, Mike Kowalchik, Jason Calacanis, Steve Gillmor, Peter Rojas, Cecile Andrews, Adam Curry, Betsy Devine and others.

=== BloggerCon ===
BloggerCon is a user-focused conference for the blogger community. BloggerCon I (October 2003) and II (April 2004), were organized by Dave Winer and friends at Harvard Law School's Berkman Center for the Internet and Society in Cambridge, Mass. BloggerCon III met at Stanford Law School on November 6, 2004.

=== Weblogs.com ===
Weblogs.com provided a free ping-server used by many blogging applications, as well as free hosting to many bloggers. After leaving Userland, Winer claimed personal ownership of the site, and in mid-June 2004 he shut down its free blog-hosting service, citing lack of resources and personal problems. A swift and orderly migration off Winer's server was facilitated by Rogers Cadenhead, whom Winer then hired to port the server to a more stable platform. In October 2005, VeriSign bought the Weblogs.com ping-server from Winer and promised that its free services would remain free. The podcasting-related web site audio.weblogs.com was also included in the $2.3 million deal.

=== Share your OPML ===
Winer opened his self-described "commons for sharing outlines, feeds, and taxonomy" in May 2006. The site allowed users to publish and syndicate blogrolls and aggregator subscriptions using OPML. Winer suspended its service in January 2008.

=== Rebooting the News ===
Since 2009, Winer has collaborated with New York University's associate professor of journalism Jay Rosen on Rebooting the News, a weekly podcast on technology and innovation in journalism. It was announced on July 1, 2011, that the show would be on break, as NYU itself was, from June to September. However, no new episodes have been released since, making show #94 released on May 23, 2011, the last.
