= Userland =

Userland may refer to:

- Radio UserLand, a computer program to aid maintaining blogs or podcasts
- UserLand Software, a U.S. software company specializing in web applications
- UserLAnd Technologies, a mobile app that allows Linux programs to run on mobile devices
- User space, operating system software that does not belong in the kernel
