= John Seybold =

John Seybold may refer to:

- John States Seybold (1897–1984), governor of Panama Canal Zone
- John W. Seybold (1916–2004), father of computer typesetting
- John Seybold (baker), proprietor of the Seybold Building in Miami, Florida.
