= John Robb (author) =

American author and military analyst

- Education: B.S. in Astronautical Engineering, USAF Academy (1985), Masters of Public and Private Management, Yale University (1995)
- Occupations: Author, analyst
- Website: http://globalguerrillas.typepad.com

John Robb is an American author, military analyst, and entrepreneur.

== Career ==
=== Military ===
Robb graduated from the United States Air Force Academy Honors Program with a Bachelor of Science in astronautical engineering in 1985 and completed USAF Undergraduate Pilot Training (UPT) in 1986.

During his military career, Robb worked in the area of counterterrorism with the United States Special Operations Command, participating in global operations as a mission commander, pilot and mission planner in El Salvador, Panama, Colombia, Turkey, and Egypt, among others.

He resigned his Air Force commission with the rank of captain in August 1992.

After leaving the Air Force, Robb attended Yale University. He graduated with a master's degree in public and private management (MPPM) in 1995.

=== Internet analyst ===
After graduating from Yale, Robb was hired by Forrester Research, a technology research company located in Cambridge, MA., in June 1995. He published his first report at Forrester in December 1995, called "Internet Computing" with George Forrester Colony, the CEO of Forrester, as the editor.

Robb was made a senior analyst in January 1996 and led the launch of Forrester's first research service dedicated to covering developments on the Internet, called "Interactive Technologies". While there, he wrote the reports, "Which Web Browser" and "Which Web Server" in early 1996. In summer 1996, he wrote the report "Navigation Hubs" which predicted that web search services like Yahoo would dominate the Web. In fall 1996, he wrote the Forrester report, "Personal Broadcast Networks" on the rise of social software — software that allowed people to broadcast their written thoughts, pictures and videos and to subscribe to other people doing the same.

For these reports, Robb was awarded Forrester's "Best Research" award in 1997. Further, the 1997 Forrester Forum (Forrester's annual conference in Boston), was dedicated to the theme of "Personal Broadcast Networks".

Robb has been quoted as an expert source on technological trends by The New York Times, The Economist, The Washington Post, The Wall Street Journal, Business Week, Fortune Magazine, CNBC, Fox News, BBC, and NPR.

=== Entrepreneur ===
In 1997, Robb co-founded (with Julio Gomez and Alex Stein) Gomez, a performance measurement company in financial services. Gomez was sold to Compuware Corporation in 2009 for $295 million.

Robb and Julio Gomez created the first Gomez Performance Scorecard at the latter's kitchen table. It was an objective system for ranking the quality of a broker's online offering, providing decision support to people opening online brokerage accounts.

With the help of Dann Sheridan, Robb designed and built the Gomez performance measurement system. This system was briefly featured as the "online broker weather report" on CNBC. The Gomez system checked availability of transactions systems at big banks and brokerage firms like Fidelity Investments and JP Morgan. It consisted of monitoring servers in 54 cities around the world, on six continents and across 23 different Internet backbones. Measurements were taken every five minutes and reported back in real time.

=== Social software pioneer ===
Robb became the president of UserLand Software — a pioneer in the development of XML-RPC, SOAP, RSS, and OPML — in 2001. He became the CEO in 2003.

He was the product manager for Radio UserLand, the first RSS aggregator and blog publishing tool in fall 2001. This tool allowed individuals to both publish their work to the Web as a blog and to subscribe to the blogs of other people. Decentralized control over publishing and subscription, as seen in Radio, now serves as the basis for social networking and social software.

To educate a growing number of people on the power of social software networks, Robb formed a discussion group called K-Logs, Knowledge Management Weblogs in 2001. This group explored how decentralized publishing and subscription using social software would and could be used.

In 2003, Robb signed a deal with Martin Nisenholtz, the CEO of New York Times digital to publish an RSS feed for The New York Times, the first major publication to use RSS.

In 2021, Robb gave testimony to the Senate Subcommittee on Competition Policy, Antitrust, and Consumer Rights on how to reform social networking. His testimony focused on Digital Rights, Data ownership, and Online identity.

=== Military theorist ===
In 2004, Robb began the blog Global Guerrillas to cover developments in terrorism and guerrilla warfare. In April 2007, he published his book Brave New War, introducing the concept of open-source warfare and superempowered terrorism. The book was featured in The New York Times by the columnist David Brooks.

His thesis contributed to the overall understanding of the "Global War on Terror" and specifically the Iraq War. Numerous other contemporary military theorists have noted the significance of Robb's work, including Thomas P.M. Barnett, William Lind and Chet Richards.

Noah Shachtman, the editor of Wired's military column, "Danger Room", wrote, "For years, now, no one has had a better read on the enemies that America has been fighting — from Afghanistan to Iraq to Indonesia to here at home — than John Robb."

David Brooks in The New York Times wrote, "Over the past few years, John Robb has been dissecting the behavior of these groups on his blog, Global Guerrillas. Robb is a graduate of the Air Force Academy and Yale University, and he has worked both as a special ops counterterrorism officer and as a successful software executive. In other words, he’s had personal experience both with modern warfare and the sort of information management that is the key to winning it. He's collected his thoughts in a fast, thought-sparking book, 'Brave New War'."

=== Resilient communities ===
In 2006, Robb turned his attention from the international war on terror to the domestic concept of "resilient communities". The concept was formally introduced in his article "Power to the People" published in Fast Company in March 2006, and expanded in Brave New War (John Wiley & Sons, 2007).

Robb defines resilient communities as a social and economic development in response to a broken bureaucracy. Resilient communities are self-dependent, producing all critical goods (food, water, energy, security, etc.) locally rather than relying on a central supply system. Such communities do not separate themselves from society, but are prepared for any breakdown in society that might arise.
