= Julio Gómez =

Julio Gómez or Gomez may refer to:

- Julio Gómez (composer) (1886–1973), Spanish composer
- Julio Gómez (Spanish runner) (1931–2023), Spanish Olympic athlete
- Julio César Gómez (1940–2022), Uruguayan basketball player
- Julio Gómez (boxer) (born 1959), retired Spanish boxer
- Julio Gómez (footballer, born 1954), Guatemalan footballer
- Julio Gomez (businessman) (born 1960), Cuban born American businessman
- Julio Gómez (Argentine runner) (born 1963), Argentine Olympic athlete
- Julio Gómez (footballer, born 1994), Mexican footballer
