= Videotext =

Videotext may refer to:

- Videotex, an interactive (two-way) information service
  - Videotext, another name for Teletext, a form of Videotex, broadcast (one-way) information service
- Living Videotext, an American software development company founded by Dave Winer
