= Seebold =

Seebold is a surname. Notable people with the surname include:

- Carl Adolf Seebold (1873–1951), Swiss impresario
- Elmar Seebold (born 1934), German philologist
- Marie Madeleine Seebold Molinary (1866–1948), American painter

== See also ==
- Sebold
