= Chris Gulker =

American photographer, programmer and writer

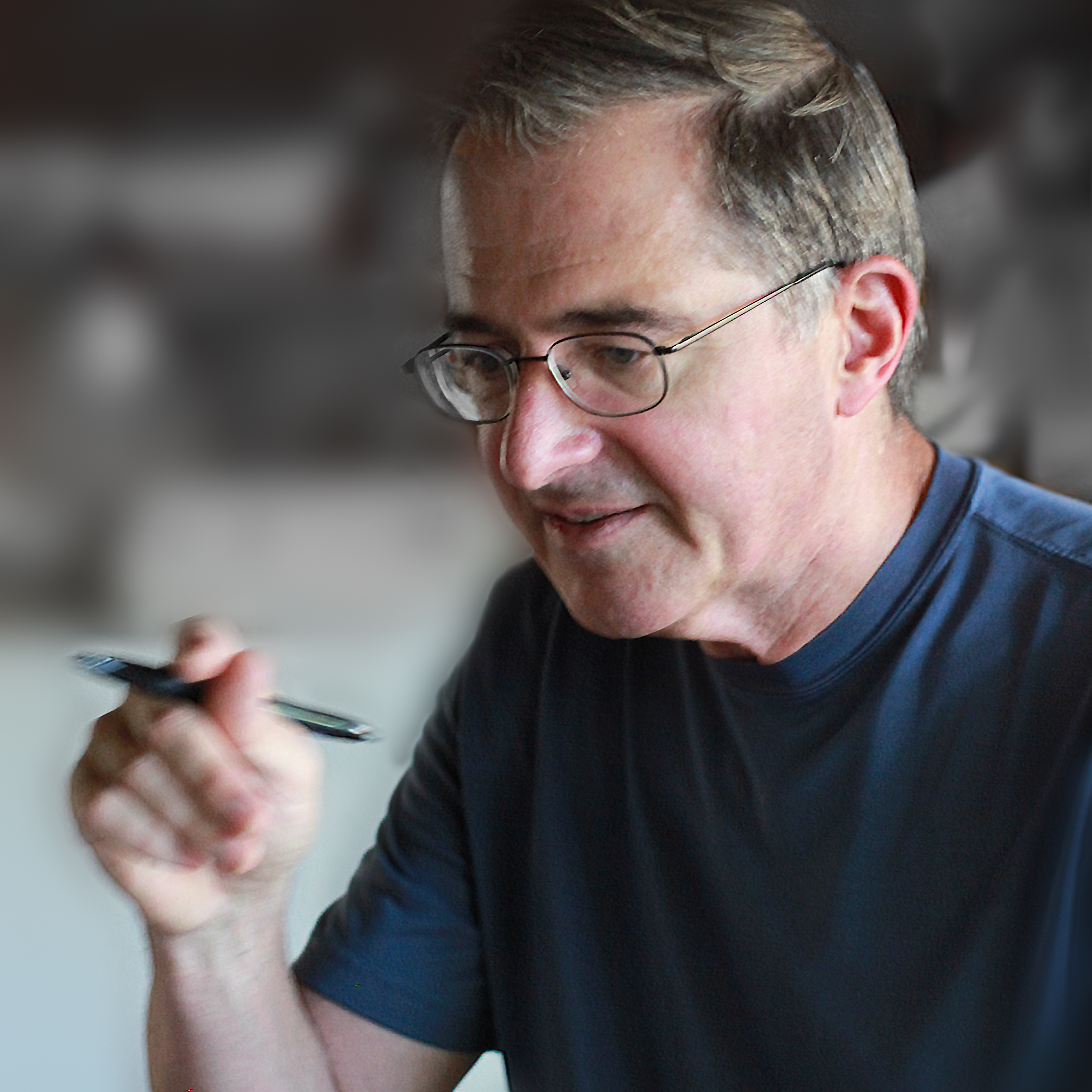
- Born: Christian Frederick Gulker; March 10, 1951; New York City
- Died: October 27, 2010 (aged 59); Menlo Park, California, U.S.
- Education: Occidental College (AB)
- Website: https://gulker.com

Christian Frederick "Chris" Gulker (March 10, 1951 – October 27, 2010) was an American photographer, programmer, writer, and pioneer in electronic publishing.

A "Silicon Valley pioneer," Gulker was "instrumental in introducing the digital publishing era to the newspaper industry" and was a central figure in the early history of blogging.

== Early years ==
Born in New York City, Gulker grew up on the shores of Lake Erie near Erie, Pennsylvania. He was a 1969 graduate of Western Reserve Academy of Hudson, Ohio, and an alumnus of Occidental College, Los Angeles, where he earned a degree in Comparative literature. He worked as a dishwasher, cab driver, tow truck operator and barman before he was hired in 1978 as a staff photographer at the Los Angeles Herald-Examiner, where the photography department came to view him as "one of its brightest stars." He also worked as a freelancer, and has been published in Time, Newsweek, Vanity Fair, Rolling Stone, Glamour and The New York Times and was twice nominated for the Pulitzer Prize. Gulker contributed to the National Press Photographers Association's Electronic Photojournalism Workshop.

== San Francisco Examiner ==
Gulker moved to Menlo Park, CA, after the Herald-Examiner closed in 1989, and joined the San Francisco Examiner, where he initially served as picture editor and led the photography staff's transition from film to digital cameras. His work made possible an all-Macintosh-produced edition of The Examiner after the 1989 Loma Prieta earthquake led to a power shutdown that idled the newspaper's publishing system.

Turning the Examiner into a "digital laboratory," he converted the newspaper from black and white to color by implementing a production system of his own design that used Macintoshes to do color separations and made The Examiner the first major American daily to switch to full-color production using desktop technology, with the first colored front page printed in January 1990. Gulker's "'hacked-together' color calibration system allowed the Examiner to incorporate color for less than it cost other papers," making him "a leader in developing in-house capabilities to use color electronic images daily on deadline."

Gulker's work, which redefined "the state of the art in editorial production methods among print-on-paper media," was driven by necessity. The Examiner, having recently switched from on-site letterpress equipment to a new flexographic press, wanted to use the new printing plant's color capability. However, under the joint operating agreement between the Examiner and its local rival, the San Francisco Chronicle, any changes to the production facility, such as introducing color, would have required the consent of both parties to the agreement, and the Chronicle wasn't interested. To produce color for the new press, the Examiner therefore had to handle it in the newsroom.

Gulker became director of development in November 1992.

In 1994, Gulker's editorial workflow system, dubbed the "virtual newsroom", was demonstrated at both Seybold shows and supported the creation of "a real Internet newspaper that used the 'Net throughout the process from story and photo solicitation to delivery." The system provided the publishing infrastructure for The Gate, the online newspaper jointly operated by the San Francisco Examiner and the San Francisco Chronicle, which made its precipitous debut on November 3, 1994 and came to be officially launched on April 5, 1995.

== Electric Examiner and the strike of 1994 ==
In 1994, as "a staff of one" and encouraged by the owner of The Examiner, William Randolph Hearst III, Gulker came to run a pilot project called The Electric Examiner, which routed wire-service stories to the Web. Gulker wanted to expand this "prototype of a future Web site" to distribute the actual reporting produced at the Examiner but was frustrated in this ambition, as the Examiner was bound by a joint operating agreement with its local rival, the San Francisco Chronicle, and could not move on its own when it came to venturing into new distribution modes. When Gulker's project was previewed in August 1994 under the name The Gate as a joint operation between the two newspapers, it was judged the "furthest ahead" among efforts to bring newspapers online.

The Electric Examiner became a focus of attention in the first two weeks of November 1994, when San Francisco's two major newspapers were hit by a strike in which some 2,600 journalists, editors, lorry drivers, press operators and paper handlers walked off their jobs. Gulker did not join them. He sided with management and set to work launching The Gate ahead of its scheduled debut in late November by modifying his system so that the Electric Examiner would now appear daily on The Gate. For the duration of the strike, Gulker's operation, which remained "heavily dependent on wire-service stories" for lack of contributing journalists and editors, was the official online version of San Francisco's two largest newspapers. On one day during the strike, according to Gulker, "the Examiner delivered 80,000 print editions, while its Web site recorded 93,038 accesses." Gulker was aware of the shortcomings of his project but hoped it would blaze a trail for online journalism after the strike, "when the full resources of the paper are available again."

Within two days, the striking journalists set up their own online newspaper, the San Francisco Free Press, and competed with The Gate as "the soul of the Examiner and the Chronicle." Led by the Examiner's associate editor Bruce Koon and former SF Weekly editor Marcelo Rodriguez, they operated from a makeshift newsroom using their own hardware and a local ISP for rented server space. The strike lasted 11 days and its competition between two online newspapers has been hailed as "a milestone for online news."

== Apple ==
Gulker left The Examiner a few months after the strike and, reputed as an "Internet publishing guru," accepted an executive position at Apple Inc. to "promote the Mac as the ideal publishing platform for the Internet." At Apple, Gulker first came to manage a new group called Publishing and Media Markets, then oversaw strategic relations for the company's Design and Publishing Markets group, and as "Apple's design and publishing guru" made frequent appearances as a speaker and panelist at publishing-oriented conferences. As Apple's publishing business development manager he advocated the use of intranets for prepress productivity gains.

== Blogging pioneer and columnist ==
Gulker's personal site Gulker.com has been online since early 1995. The "news page" on Gulker.com, which launched in May 1997, was modeled after Dave Winer's Scripting News and ran on Winer's Frontier publishing software. Gulker, anticipating the work of Jorn Barger, was the first to propose a network of bloggers and pioneered two of the most effective means through which blogging emerged as a social medium, the blogroll and link attribution.

From 1997 until 2003, Gulker contributed his column "The View from Silicon Valley" to the weekly technology supplement of the British newspaper The Independent, in which he distinguished himself through "sharp wit and literary ability".

== Startup advisor, Adobe Systems ==
Leaving Apple in 1999, Gulker became founder, senior manager or advisor to several startups. In September 1999, he joined the web development company Montclare Technologies as VP of marketing, and in 2001 he became marketing vice president of RealTimeImage, a company specializing in high resolution streaming imaging.

From 2004 to 2007, Gulker was product manager for the Acrobat family at Adobe Systems.

== Cancer patient ==
Gulker was diagnosed with an inoperable malignant glioma brain tumor in October 2006. In his final years, despite his advancing paralysis, he traveled to France, took a tour of the American South, visited friends and shared his experiences as a cancer patient via his blog. Deciding against "heroic end-of-life measures" he opted for palliative care rather than continued treatment.

In July 2010, his oncologist informed him that he had only a few months to live. Gulker died peacefully at his home on October 27, 2010, aged 59. He was survived by his wife of 29 years, Linda Hubbard Gulker.
