= William Everett Potter =

American engineer and military officer (1905–1988)

12th Governor of the Panama Canal Zone
- In office 1956–1960
- Preceded by: John States Seybold
- Succeeded by: William Arnold Carter

Personal details
- Born: 17 July 1905 Oshkosh, Wisconsin, U.S.
- Died: 5 December 1988 (aged 83) Orlando, Florida, U.S.
- Resting place: Woodlawn Memorial Park, Orlando
- Awards: Army Distinguished Service Medal; Legion of Merit; Bronze Star Medal; Croix de Guerre 1939–1945 (France)
- Nickname: Joe

Military service
- Branch/service: United States Army
- Years of service: 1928–1960
- Rank: Major general
- Commands: 25th Engineer Battalion; 1138th Engineer Group; Missouri River District; Alaska District; Missouri River Division
- Battles/wars: Banana Wars; Occupation of Nicaragua; World War II; Normandy; Northern France; Ardennes-Alsace; Rhineland; Central Europe

William Everett Potter (17 July 1905 – 5 December 1988) was an American engineer and military officer who served as Governor of the Panama Canal Zone from 1956 to 1960. He was also involved in the logistics of the 1964 New York World's Fair and the construction of Walt Disney World.

A 1928 graduate of the United States Military Academy at West Point and a 1933 graduate of Massachusetts Institute of Technology, Potter served in Nicaragua, where he helped survey a route for the Nicaraguan Canal. As an assistant to the Chief Engineer of the Pittsburgh Engineer District, he was in charge of the construction of the Tygart Dam in West Virginia and the Emsworth Locks and Dam in Pennsylvania.

During World War II, Potter served in the G-3 section of the European Theater of Operations, United States Army (ETOUSA) as the executive officer of the Psychological Warfare Division, which he helped to establish. In February 1944 he became the chief of the Planning and Operations Branch of the G-4 section. In this role he was responsible for aspects of the planning of American logistics in the Normandy campaign. He played an important part in the creation of the Red Ball Express.

After the war he commanded the Missouri River and Alaska Districts and the Missouri River Division. Projects he oversaw included the Garrison Dam, Gavins Point Dam, Tuttle Creek Lake and the Big Bend Dam. He retired from the Army in 1960 with the rank of major general and joined Walt Disney Corporation in 1964. He became a Disney Legend in 1997, and one of the three ferries that transport guests across the Seven Seas Lagoon was re-christened General Joe Potter in his honor.

== Early life ==
Potter as a United States Military Academy cadet c. 1928

William Everett Potter was born on 17 July 1905 in Oshkosh, Wisconsin, the son of William Bradford Potter and his wife Arlie Bell née Johnson. He had two brothers. His father worked at various jobs, and the family moved to Beloit, Wisconsin, and then to Toledo, Ohio, where Potter attended Scott High School. He graduated from high school in 1922, and entered the University of Toledo.

Potter entered the United States Military Academy at West Point on 2 July 1923. While there he acquired the nickname "Joe", as Joe Potter was the name of the barracks' janitor. In his senior year he was a cadet captain in charge of a company of plebes. He was suspended for a year in September 1926 for hazing them by making them run up and down three flights of stairs. He returned to West Point in 1927 with the rank of cadet private. He graduated on 9 June 1928, ranked 26th in his class, and was commissioned as a second lieutenant in the United States Army Corps of Engineers. He was given permission to wear the 1927 class ring.

Following the usual post-graduation furlough, Potter's first posting was to Fort DuPont, Delaware, as a company officer with the 1st Engineer Regiment from 9 September 1928 to 10 October 1929. He then went to Nicaragua, where he served under First Lieutenant Leslie R. Groves Jr., surveying a route for the Nicaraguan Canal. It was customary for young engineer officers to complete their professional education at a civilian university. He graduated from the Massachusetts Institute of Technology on 6 June 1933 with a Bachelor of Science degree in civil engineering.

On 20 July 1933 Potter became assistant to the Chief Engineer of the Pittsburgh Engineer District, where he was promoted to first lieutenant on 1 January 1934. He was in charge of the construction of the Tygart Dam in West Virginia and then of the Emsworth Locks and Dam in Pennsylvania. While he was in Grafton, West Virginia, he courted Ruth Turner. They married on 26 July 1936, and had two daughters, Jo Ann and Susan Ruth. Susan later married the son of Potter's 1927 classmate Herman Walter Schull Jr. Potter was a student officer in the advanced officers' course at the Engineer School at Fort Belvoir, Virginia, from 1 September 1936 to 27 August 1937, but this was interrupted by flood relief duty during the Ohio River flood of 1937. He was then assigned to Reserve Officer Training Corps (ROTC) duty at Ohio State University, where he was promoted to captain on 9 June 1938.

== World War II ==
In September 1940, during World War II, Potter returned to engineer troop duty, joining the 1st Armored Division's 16th Engineer Battalion at Fort Knox, Kentucky, as its supply officer, with the rank of major from 31 January 1941. In March 1941 he became the executive officer of the 24th Engineer Battalion, part of the newly formed 4th Armored Division at Pine Camp. He attended an abbreviated 90-day course at the Command and General Staff College at Fort Leavenworth, Kansas, and then became the executive officer of the 22nd Engineer Battalion of the 5th Armored Division back at Fort Knox in October 1941.

Promoted to lieutenant colonel on 1 February 1942, he assumed command of the 6th Armored Division's 25th Engineer Battalion at Camp Chaffee, Arkansas. In each case he had to train raw recruits to create a new battalion. The 6th Armored Division trained at the Desert Training Center. On 30 April 1943, he assumed command of the 1138th Engineer Group, a group of three engineer battalions assigned to support the II Armored Corps at Camp Cooke, California. He was promoted to lieutenant colonel on 17 May 1943.

On 18 October 1943, Potter joined the G-3 section of the European Theater of Operations, United States Army (ETOUSA) in London in the United Kingdom, initially as Chief of the Troops Section, then as the executive officer of the Psychological Warfare Division, which he helped to establish. In this role he reported to the commander of the division, Brigadier General Tristram Tupper, and worked in cooperation with the Office of Strategic Services (OSS).

In February 1944 he became the chief of the Planning and Operations Branch of the G-4 section at ETOUSA, which increasingly became known as the Communications Zone (COMZ). In this role he was responsible for aspects of the planning of American logistics in the Normandy campaign and the subsequent campaigns in Northern France. This included the preparation and organization of logistical units, over-the-beach logistics, the rehabilitation of ports, pipelines and railways, and the establishment of depots. He played an important part in the creation of the Red Ball Express, which delivered supplies by truck until the railways and pipelines could meet demand. He was awarded the Legion of Merit, the Bronze Star Medal and the French Croix de Guerre 1939–1945.

== Post-war ==
Potter was hospitalized for jaundice for two months in early 1945. Soon after he was released from the hospital, he returned to the United States as District Engineer of the Missouri River District, based in Kansas City, Missouri, from 27 July 1945 to 7 April 1948. He oversaw civil works and flood control projects, such as the Tuttle Creek Dam, the Harlan County Reservoir and dikes and levees along the Missouri River. He was then appointed District Engineer of the Alaska District, based at Anchorage, Alaska. Over $100 million of civil works (equivalent to $1,040 million in 2024) was in progress at this time. Works included new barracks at Fort Richardson and an extension to the runway at Eielson Air Force Base.

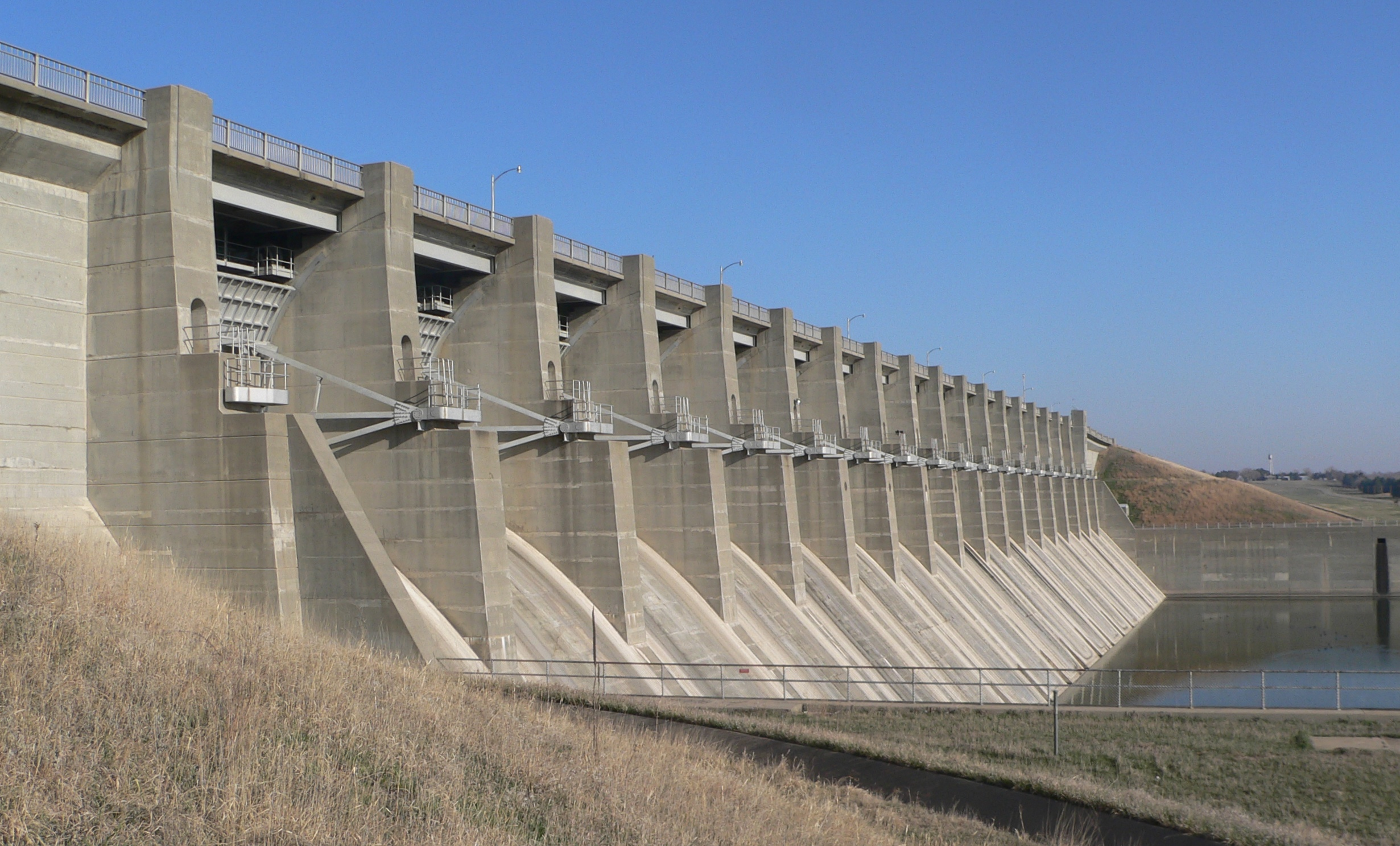
Harlan County Dam outlet structure

The Chief of Engineers, Lieutenant General Lewis A. Pick, recalled Potter from Alaska to Washington, D.C., to become the Assistant Chief Engineer in charge of Civil Works, but the position was graded as one for a brigadier general. In the past officers had acted in the appropriate rank when appointed to a position calling for it, but the Chief of Staff of the United States Army, General Omar N. Bradley changed the policy, insisting that officers be of the appropriate grade. Pick reluctantly replaced Potter with Brigadier General Claude H. Chorpening. Instead, Potter became the Assistant Chief of Engineers for Special Projects, working on the St. Lawrence Seaway in cooperation with Canada.

Potter was a student officer at the National War College from August 1951 until June 1952. He found this course fascinating; guest lecturers included Margaret Mead, Allen Dulles and Abba Eban. While he was still a student, Pick appointed him to the staff of the Industrial College of the Armed Forces. This carried with it the grade of brigadier general, and he was promoted to the temporary rank on 29 April 1952.

In July 1952, Potter became the Division Engineer of the Missouri River Engineer Division, based in Omaha, Nebraska. This posting coincided with the Korean War, and there was a major boost in military construction projects. These included a network of new airbases for the heavy bombers of the Strategic Air Command and its headquarters in Omaha. There were also facilities like the Weldon Spring Chemical Plant in St. Louis and the Sunflower Ordnance Works in Kansas. The region was still recovering from the Great Flood of 1951, and this brought a greater emphasis on flood control projects. These included the Garrison Dam project, which Potter had to defend before Congress when major cost overruns occurred, Gavins Point Dam in South Dakota, the Tuttle Creek Lake project in Kansas, and the Big Bend Dam project in South Dakota. He was promoted to major general on 18 May 1956.

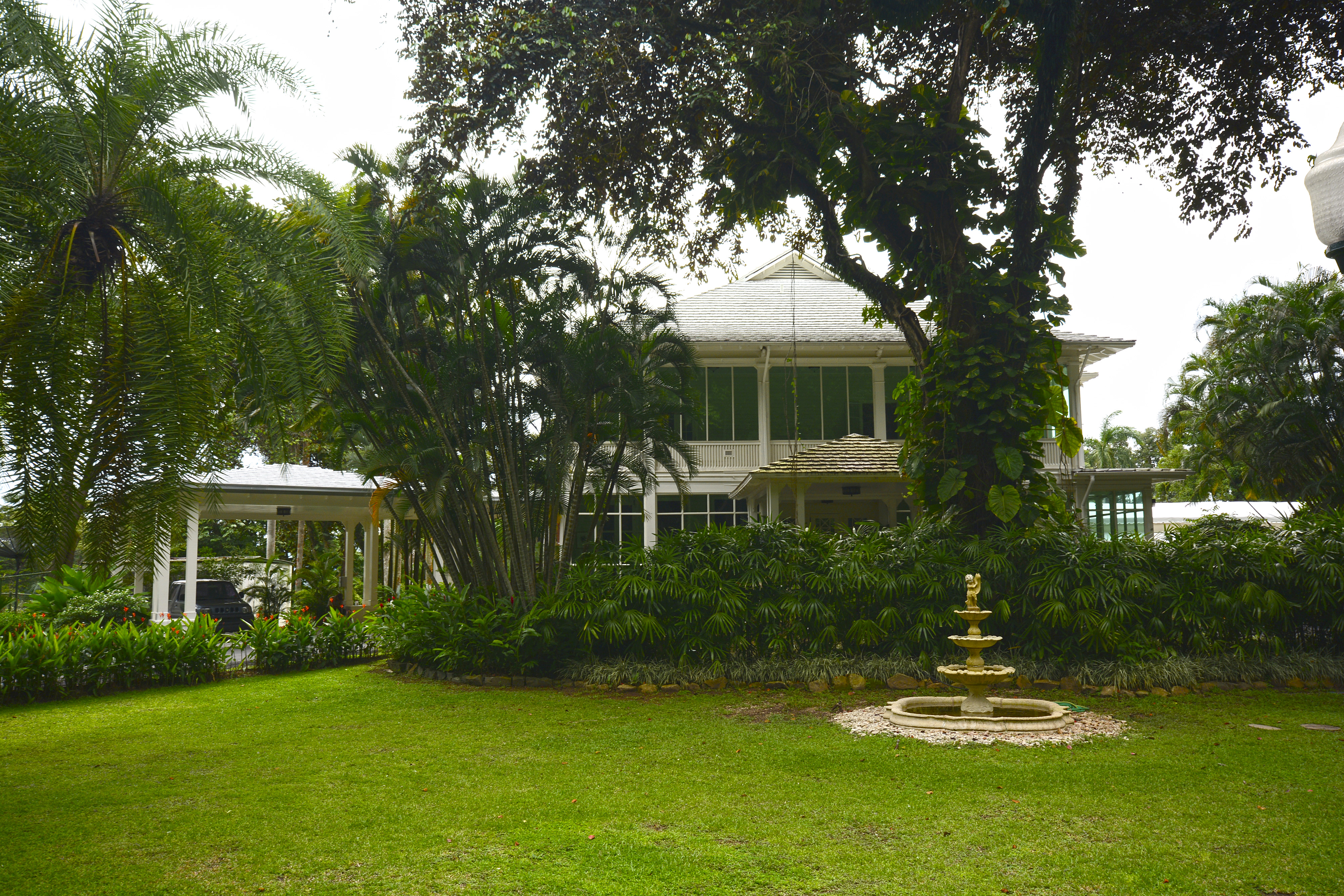
The Panama Canal Zone Governor's mansion

President Dwight D. Eisenhower appointed Potter Governor of the Panama Canal Zone and President of the Panama Canal Company in June 1956. As such, he was responsible for the administration of the zone, its 50,000 residents, and its maritime traffic. When he arrived, the Panama Canal Zone had commenced a major project to change the electrical system over from 25 Hz to 60 Hz. This had been the standard when the canal was first built, but had long since been superseded elsewhere. The electric motors operating the locks were converted. For the first time people were able to purchase air conditioning.

To improve navigation, he commenced the widening of the Culebra Cut from 300 to 500 feet (91 to 152 m). He commenced the construction of the Bridge of the Americas, which was designed and built by Sverdrup & Parcel, a company founded by fellow army engineer Leif J. Sverdrup. He also refurbished and therefore saved the Governor's mansion, which had been under threat of being torn down. For his post-war service, he was awarded the Army Distinguished Service Medal. There were rumors that Potter would succeed Lieutenant General Emerson C. Itschner as Chief of Engineers, but this became unlikely after the 1959 anti-American riots in Panama. Potter retired from the Army with the rank of major general on 30 July 1960.

== Later life ==
Potter became executive vice president of the 1964 New York World's Fair, working under urban planner Robert Moses. He was responsible for the construction of the United States federal and state attractions, which included 26 state pavilions and the $17 million United States Pavilion (equivalent to $131 million in 2024).

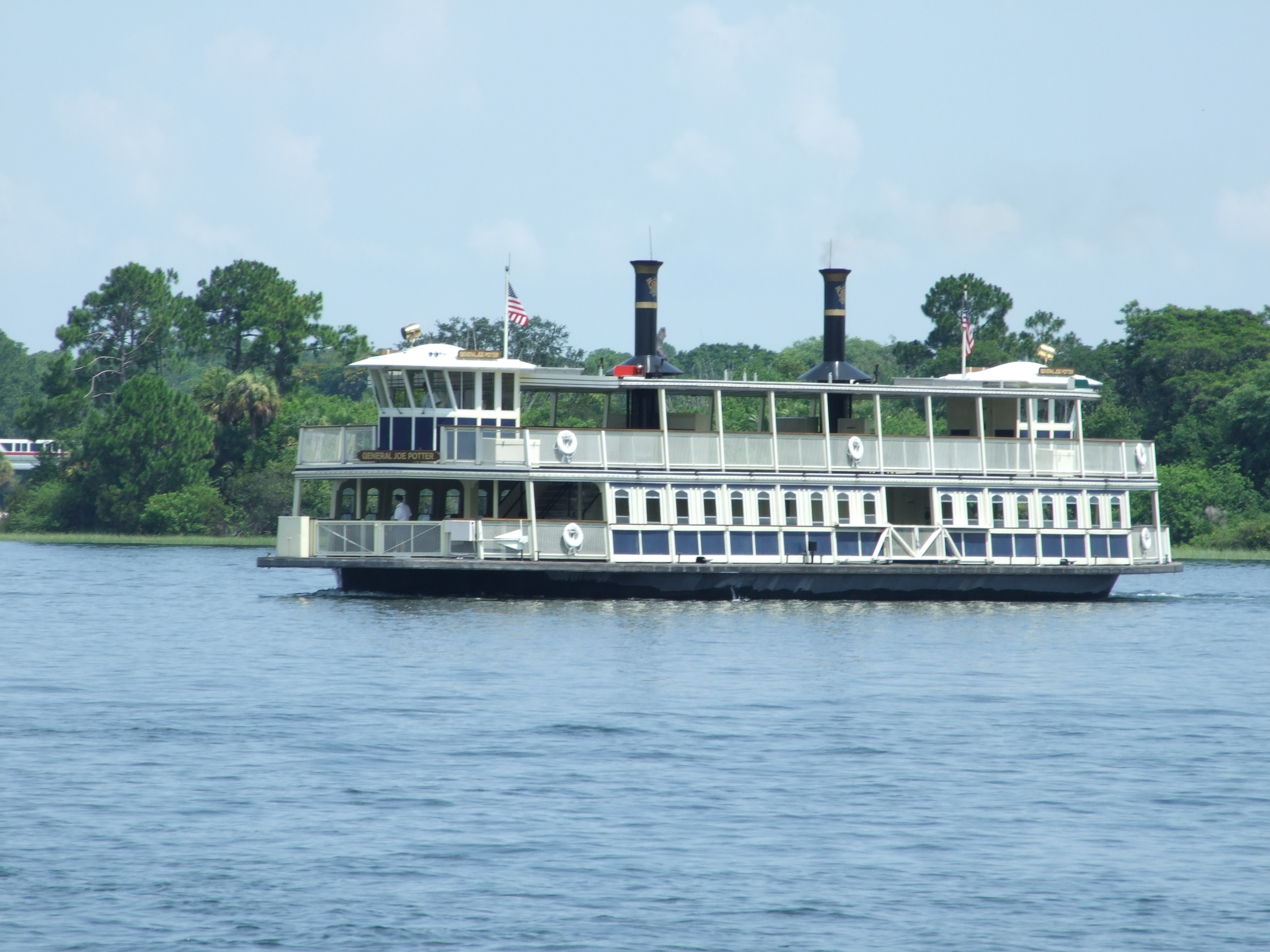
The General Joe Potter at Walt Disney World

At the World's Fair Potter met Walt Disney, who had the contract for four of the pavilions there, including It's a Small World and the Great Moments with Mr. Lincoln exhibit for the state of Illinois, which later featured in Disney's The Hall of Presidents. He joined the Disney Corporation on 27 September 1965 as vice president of Walt Disney Productions for Florida Planning. He was assigned to help build the theme park in Orlando, Florida. He became a senior vice president for EPCOT and president of the Reedy Creek Improvement District, the governing body of the 28,000-acre (11,000 ha) site that includes the theme park. He was the first Disney executive to move to Florida.

Potter played a key role in the construction of Walt Disney World, and is credited with helping to build much of the underground utilities, such as electrical power, sewerage and water treatment, and other infrastructure. He devised the system of drainage canals for the site, which became known as "Joe's ditches". He dredged 5,000,000 cubic yards (3,800,000 m^{3}) of muck to turn Bay Lake into a crystal-clear water feature, and built a 200-acre (81 ha) lagoon by the Polynesian Hotel.

After leaving Disney in 1974, Potter became the president of Potter, Fowler and Associates Management Consultants, and served on civic and business boards, including the Greater Orlando Aviation Authority and the Orlando Regional Medical Center Foundation. Potter died of heart failure on 5 December 1988 at Orlando Regional Medical Center in Orlando, Florida. His remains were buried in the Woodlawn Memorial Park in Orlando. Main Street USA at the Magic Kingdom at Disney World has General Joe’s Building Permits in the window above the confectionery. He became a Disney Legend in 1997, and one of the three ferries that transport guests across the Seven Seas Lagoon was re-christened General Joe Potter in his honor.

== Dates of rank ==
Insignia	Rank	Component	Date	Reference
	Second lieutenant	United States Army Corps of Engineers	9 June 1928	
	First lieutenant	United States Army Corps of Engineers	1 January 1934	
	Captain	United States Army Corps of Engineers	9 June 1938	
	Major	Army of the United States	31 January 1941	
	Lieutenant colonel	Army of the United States	1 February 1942	
	Colonel	Army of the United States	17 May 1945	
	Major	United States Army Corps of Engineers	9 June 1945	
	Lieutenant colonel	United States Army Corps of Engineers	1 July 1948	
	Colonel	United States Army Corps of Engineers	15 August 1951	
	Brigadier general (temporary)	Regular Army	29 April 1952	
	Brigadier general	Regular Army	11 April 1957	
	Major general (temporary)	Regular Army	18 May 1956	
	Major general	Regular Army	1 August 1957	
	Major General (retired)	United States Army Reserve	30 July 1960	

== Notes ==
Preceded by John S. Seybold	Governor of Panama Canal Zone; 1956–1960	Succeeded by William A. Carter
