= UserLand Software =

U.S. software company

- Type: Private
- Industry: Internet, software
- Founded: 1988
- Headquarters: Los Altos, California, US
- Key people: Dave Winer (founder and former CEO), Jean-Louis Gassée (former board member), John Robb (former president), Robert Scoble (former Director of Marketing)
- Products: Web content management and blogging software packages and services
- Number of employees: fewer than 10 at any time
- Website: www.userland.com

UserLand Software is a US-based software company, founded in 1988, that sells web content management, as well as blogging software packages and services.

== Company history ==
Dave Winer founded the company in 1988 after leaving Symantec in the spring of 1988. Jean-Louis Gassée, who resigned in 1990 as chief of Apple's product development, came to serve on UserLand's board of directors.

== Frontier ==
UserLand's first product release of April 1989 was UserLand IPC, a developer tool for interprocess communication that was intended to evolve into a cross-platform RPC tool. In January 1992 UserLand released version 1.0 of Frontier, a scripting environment for the Macintosh which included an object database and a scripting language named UserTalk. At the time of its original release, Frontier was the only system-level scripting environment for the Macintosh, but Apple was working on its own scripting language, AppleScript, and started bundling it with the System 7 system software. As a consequence, most Macintosh scripting work came to be done in the less powerful, but free, scripting language provided by Apple.

UserLand responded to Applescript by re-positioning Frontier as a Web development environment, distributing the software free of charge with the "Aretha" release of May 1995. In late 1996, Frontier 4.1 had become "an integrated development environment that lends itself to the creation and maintenance of Web sites and management of Web pages sans much busywork," and by the time Frontier 4.2 was released in January 1997, the software was firmly established in the realms of website management and CGI scripting, allowing users to "taste the power of large-scale database publishing with free software."

Frontier's NewsPage suite came to play a pivotal role in the emergence of blogging through its adoption by Jorn Barger, Chris Gulker, and others in the 1997–98 period.

UserLand launched a Windows version of Frontier 5.0 in January 1998 and began charging for licenses again with the 5.1 release of June 1998.

Frontier subsequently became the kernel for two of UserLand's products, Manila and Radio UserLand, as well as Dave Winer's OPML Editor, all of which support the UserTalk scripting language.

UserLand eventually placed Frontier under the open source GNU General Public License with the 10.0a1 release of September 28, 2004. Frontier is now maintained by the Frontier Kernel Project.

== Early Web building applications ==
Userland developed two pioneering Web building applications, AutoWeb in early 1995 and Clay Basket later that year. Both applications went through a free public beta period, yet neither was ever released in a 1.0 version. In 1996 Clay Basket was abandoned in favor of improved Web publishing functionality built into Frontier.

== Manila ==
Launched as part of Frontier 6.1 in November 1999, Manila is a content management system that allows the hosting of web sites and their editing through a browser. Within days of releasing Manila, UserLand set up a free Manila hosting service, EditThisPage.com, which quickly became a popular weblogging service.

== Radio UserLand ==
Radio UserLand is a client-side weblog system that hosts blogs on UserLand's servers for an annual software license fee. The software includes an RSS aggregator and was one of the first applications to both send and receive audio files as RSS enclosures (see podcasting). UserLand was an early adopter of the RSS syndication method, merging Winer's Scripting News XML format with Netscape's RSS.

First released as a public beta under the name Pike in March 2000, the software came to be released in synch with Manila version numbering: the initial release of 2001 was named Radio UserLand 7.0 and its only major upgrade in 2002 Radio UserLand 8.0. The software is no longer considered to be under active development.

== XML-based protocols and formats ==
UserLand counts among the earliest adopters of XML, with first experiments made in late 1997. The company was involved in the development, specification and implementation of several XML formats and was noted for its commitment to openness.

=== XML-RPC ===
Created in 1998 by UserLand Software and Microsoft, XML-RPC is a remote procedure call protocol that uses XML to encode its calls and HTTP as a transport mechanism.

UserLand first included a stable XML-RPC framework with its 5.1.3 release of Frontier in August 1998 and subsequently made extensive use of XML-RPC in its Frontier-based products, Manila and Radio UserLand. XML-RPC is also used in the MetaWeblog API.

=== SOAP ===
SOAP evolved from XML-RPC and was designed as an object-access protocol by Dave Winer, Don Box, Bob Atkinson, and Mohsen Al-Ghosein in 1998, with backing from Microsoft, where Atkinson and Al-Ghosein worked at the time.

SOAP 1.1 was submitted to the W3C by Microsoft, IBM, and UserLand, amongst others, on May 9, 2000. Version 1.2 of the proposed standard became a W3C recommendation on June 24, 2003.

=== RSS ===
RSS (Really Simple Syndication) is a family of Web feed formats used to publish frequently updated works—such as blog entries, news headlines, audio, and video—in a standardized format. An RSS document (which is called a "feed", "web feed", or "channel") includes full or summarized text, plus metadata such as publishing dates and authorship.

Between 1999 and 2003, UserLand contributed various versions of the RSS specification. For an overview of the process see the History of web syndication technology.

Using RSS, UserLand also ran one of the first Web aggregators, My.UserLand.Com, which allowed users to follow numerous weblogs from a single web page.

Userland's RSS advocacy led them to develop RSS feeds for the New York Times company. The original feeds used a variation on standard RSS, and the feeds were only publicized to UserLand Radio bloggers.

=== OPML ===
Outline Processor Markup Language (OPML) is an XML format for outlines. Originally developed in 2000 as a native file format for Radio UserLand's outliner application, it has since been adopted for other uses, the most common being to exchange lists of web feeds between web feed aggregators.
