= Jorn Barger =

American blogger

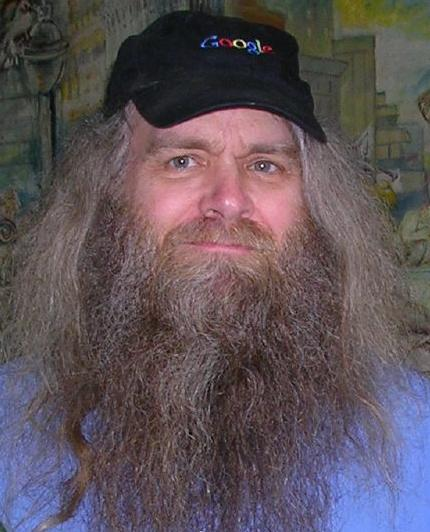
- Jorn Barger in 2008
- Born: 1953 (age 72–73); Yellow Springs, Ohio, U.S.
- Occupation: Blogger
- Known for: Editing Robot Wisdom

Jorn Barger (/ˈbɑːrɡər/; born 1953) is an American blogger, best known as editor of Robot Wisdom, an early weblog. He has written extensively on James Joyce and artificial intelligence, among other subjects; his writing is almost entirely self-published.

== Life ==
Born 1953 in Yellow Springs, Ohio, as the second child of Rex Barger and Criss Barger Stange, Jorn Barger spent his childhood in his hometown. At age 11 he got to use an early programmable digital computer, the Minivac 601. His family moved to Bemus Point, New York, in 1966.

He graduated high school a year early and attended Jamestown Community College, Antioch College, New College of Florida and University at Buffalo without earning a degree. In 1973 he decided against a career in computing and "worked on self-discovery" instead for the next six years. During this period, in 1978, he lived for six months at The Farm, Stephen Gaskin's intentional community in Tennessee.

During the first half of the 1980s he programmed games and educational software for the Apple II, Commodore 64, and Atari 8-bit computers. From 1989 to the end of 1992, Barger worked as a research programmer at Northwestern University's Institute for the Learning Sciences under the artificial intelligence researcher Roger Schank. He is not known to have held regular employment since and supports himself with "odd bits of contract work."

Previously a longtime resident of the Rogers Park neighborhood in Chicago, Barger was living in Socorro, New Mexico as of late 2003. He has a daughter named Elizabeth.

== Usenet ==
Barger has been an active Usenet participant since 1989, with "nearly ten thousand postings". He wrote early FAQs on ASCII art, Kate Bush, Thomas Pynchon, and James Joyce. In 1994 he proposed the idea of the "Inverse Law of Usenet Bandwidth": "The more interesting your life becomes, the less you post... and vice versa." As an "unstoppable Usenet poster who could carry on simultaneous debates about Ibsen, Chomsky, artificial intelligence, and Kate Bush," he became an "online legend" who would also get cited in the national press as an expert on Usenet.

== Weblog ==
Barger started Robot Wisdom in February 1995, publishing essays and resources on James Joyce, AI, history, Internet culture, hypertext design, and technology trends. Announcements of plans for a future "hardcopy edition" of Robot Wisdom for purchase began appearing at the foot of some of the site's pages.

On December 17, 1997, inspired by Dave Winer's Scripting News and running on Winer's Frontier publishing software, Barger began posting daily entries to his Robot Wisdom Weblog in the hope of finding "an audience who might see the connections between [his] many interests." These postings featured "a list of links each day shaped by his own interests in the arts and technology," thus offering a "day-to-day log of his reading and intellectual pursuits" and coining the term "weblog" as a novel form of web publishing. The term was shortened to "blog" by Peter Merholz in 1999.

Barger has also described his intentions in terms of exploration and discovery: to elucidate "what treasures were there" and to "make the web as a whole more transparent," a weblog needed to provide a constantly updated and well-described stream of the "best web links." Robot Wisdom's Net.literate portal, which started in July 1998, was a human-edited web directory that served as a complement to Barger's weblog and aimed to provide the best links on a wide range of topics arranged in ten categories.

Robot Wisdom Weblog acquired a large and enthusiastic following: after a computing newsletter had celebrated the weblog as "offbeat," Village Voice described it as "one of the best collections of news and musings culled from the Web," The Guardian called Barger "a highly observant and thoughtful surfer at work" and named his site "one of the most popular weblogs." InfoWorld counted it among the very few weblogs that were "worth a visit," Brill's Content claimed that it presented "news the way web pioneers envisioned it—hypertextual, wide-reaching, and exhaustive," Fast Company called it "one of the best Web logs on the Net," Feed wrote that the site was "frequented by thousands of the Net's most knowledgeable," Wired hailed it as "one of the oldest and most popular weblogs," and The New Yorker commended Barger's "healthy appetite for everything from literature to science," whereas The Register found that "there's no better reader on the Internet than Jorn Barger." The contents of Robot Wisdom Weblog in its heyday have been recalled as a "mesmerizing sequence of arcana" and a "cornucopia of offbeat delights."

Barger has also been recognized for his contribution to the emergence of the blogosphere. He was nominated among the "visionaries who changed the face of the Web in 1998" in CNET's Web Innovator Awards for having "inspired the Web Log community." Barger's work has been judged "seminal," and he reportedly "set the tone for a million blogs to come." An ACM paper discusses Barger and Chris Gulker, along with other early bloggers such as Raphael Carter, as the originators of blogging as a networked practice.

In September 1999, Barger posted one of the first in-depth examinations of weblogs, the "Weblog FAQ," and he led a weblog forum between August 1999 and April 2000.

In December 1999, Barger linked to a passage by anti-zionist critic Israel Shahak, which drew a concerned response from a fellow blogger and led to allegations of anti-Semitism. Subsequently, criticism of Israel and Judaism became a staple of Robot Wisdom Weblog and the site came to carry slogans in the header banner, such as "judaism [sic] is racism is incompatible with democracy," that many readers and fellow bloggers found "objectionable." Along with a reduced posting schedule and intermittent cessation of updates after 2000, Barger's unexpected anti-Israel turn has been cited as a main contributing factor to a "slow fade-out" of the site's popularity and reputation.

Robot Wisdom has stopped updating or gone offline repeatedly for protracted periods of time. By December 2001, Barger was experiencing financial difficulties that he announced would cause an interruption in keeping Robot Wisdom online. The site then went offline for a couple of months. Barger allowed his domain registration to lapse in early 2005, but managed to bring the site back online a few weeks later. Robot Wisdom went offline again in late January 2007. On 10 February, Barger placed a note on his Robot Wisdom Auxiliary weblog soliciting $10 (US) donations, payable to his web host, to help "save robotwisdom.com". By 12 February, Robotwisdom.com was online again.

Barger has experimented with monetizing Robot Wisdom soliciting advertisements in 2000, and, in 2005, donations via PayPal, yet never made "any money from his Web log."

== On James Joyce ==
Barger seeks to establish a "connection between artificial intelligence and the masterworks of James Joyce," whom he refers to as a master of descriptive psychology. He has studied Joyce's notebooks and manuscripts for Ulysses and Finnegans Wake. He has also prepared an online "shorter" annotated version of Finnegans Wake. Barger's website has been cited for "extensive research into the Ulysses and Finnegans Wake manuscripts," yet very little of this work has passed academic peer review. As a result, it can sometimes be difficult to tell what is agreed upon by Joyce scholars and what is Barger's conjecture. Barger seemed to acknowledge this when he published his list of "50+ Joycean Conjectures".

Barger has contributed one book chapter on Finnegans Wake and a book review in the James Joyce Quarterly.

== Autobiographical postings ==
Over the years, Barger has posted a number of autobiographical accounts. These include the following works:

- Barger, Jorn (February 7, 1993). "Inside Schank's ILS, Chapters 1-6 (long)". comp.ai.
- Barger, Jorn (April 26, 1994). "So much hate". rec.music.gaffa.
- Barger, Jorn (1996). "My Background in AI". Robot Wisdom. Archived from the original on July 8, 2012.
- Barger, Jorn (1999). "The saga of Jorn". Robot Wisdom. Archived from the original on July 16, 2012.
- Barger, Jorn (1999). "Jorn's elementary years". Robot Wisdom. Archived from the original on May 25, 2012.
- Barger, Jorn (1999). "Jorn's highschool years". Robot Wisdom. Archived from the original on March 6, 2012.
- Barger, Jorn (December 1999). "My.Internet: Jorn's Internet years". Robot Wisdom. Archived from the original on August 17, 2000.
- Barger, Jorn (January 2000). "Jorn's musical autobiography". Robot Wisdom. Archived from the original on March 5, 2012.
- Barger, Jorn (December 16, 2006). "Historical note". Robot Wisdom auxiliary.
- Barger, Jorn (July 6, 2007). "Jorn Barger". Canon 2.0.
- Barger, Jorn (August 22, 2007). "Jorn Barger (Wikipedia template)". Robot Wisdom Auxiliary.
