= SFGate =

American news website in San Francisco, California

- Website type: News website
- Available in: American English
- Founded: November 3, 1994; 31 years ago
- Headquarters: 901 Mission Street, San Francisco, California
- Country of origin: United States
- Owner: Hearst Newspapers
- Website: www.sfgate.com
- ISSN: 1932-8672
- OCLC number: 1390658754

SFGate is a news website based in San Francisco covering news, culture, travel, food, politics and sports in the San Francisco Bay Area, Hawaii, and California.

== History ==
Launched on November 3, 1994, as The Gate in the wake of an eleven-day newspaper strike and renamed SFGate in 1998, the site once served as the digital home of the San Francisco Chronicle. Hearst Newspapers bought the site and the Chronicle in the early 2000s. SFGate and the Chronicle split into separate newsrooms in 2019, with independent editorial staff. Grant Marek took over as editor-in-chief in 2019. At the time SFGate split from the Chronicle in 2019, it had 21 staff members. By 2021, the SFGate newsroom consisted of about 40 staff, including Drew Magary and Rod Benson.

By 2025, SFGate had 60 employees, with half of them working remotely in 23 different cities, and claimed that it was "the largest news site on the entire West Coast". Press Gazette profiled SFGate in 2025, describing it as the largest website dedicated to local news in the United States, and noting that it had expanded to cover the entire state of California, particularly popular tourist destinations such as national parks and Disneyland.

== Awards and accolades ==
In 2010, SFGate won the Pulitzer Prize for Editorial Cartooning for Mark Fiore's cartoons, marking the first time the award had been given to work not appearing in print.

Since 2019, the site won awards from the San Francisco Press Club, North American Travel Journalists Association, and Society of American Travel Writers.
