= Kevin Marks =

British programmer, blogger

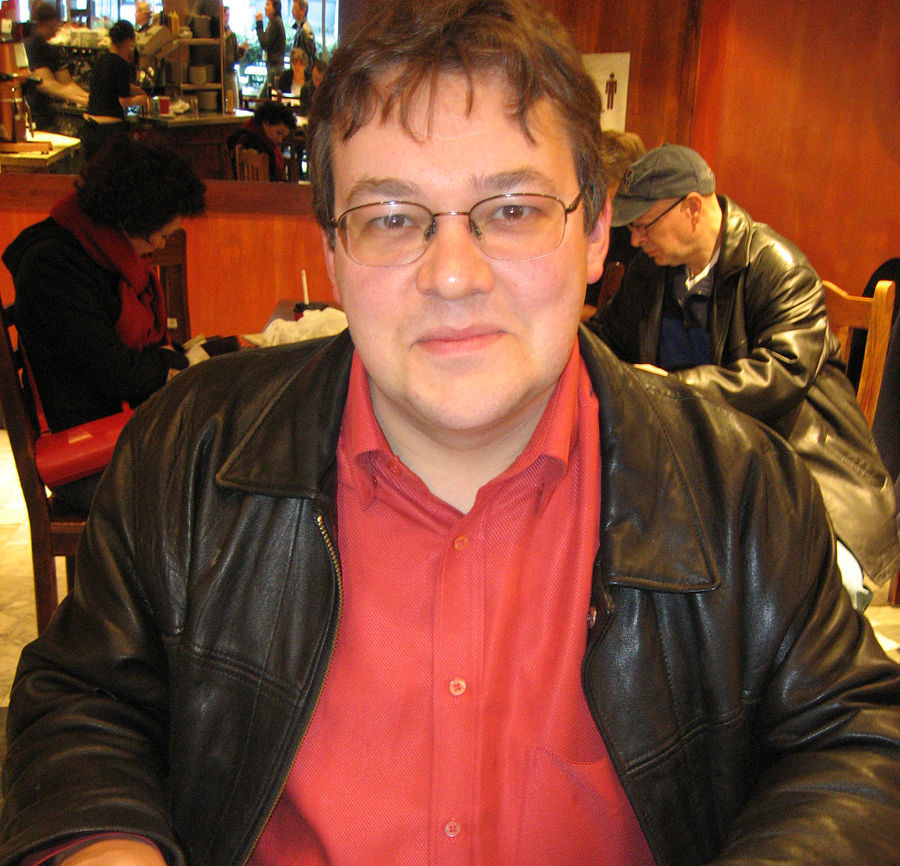
- Born: 13 September 1966 (age 59); Harrow, London, England, UK
- Occupations: Programmer, blogger
- Employer: None
- Website: https://www.kevinmarks.com/

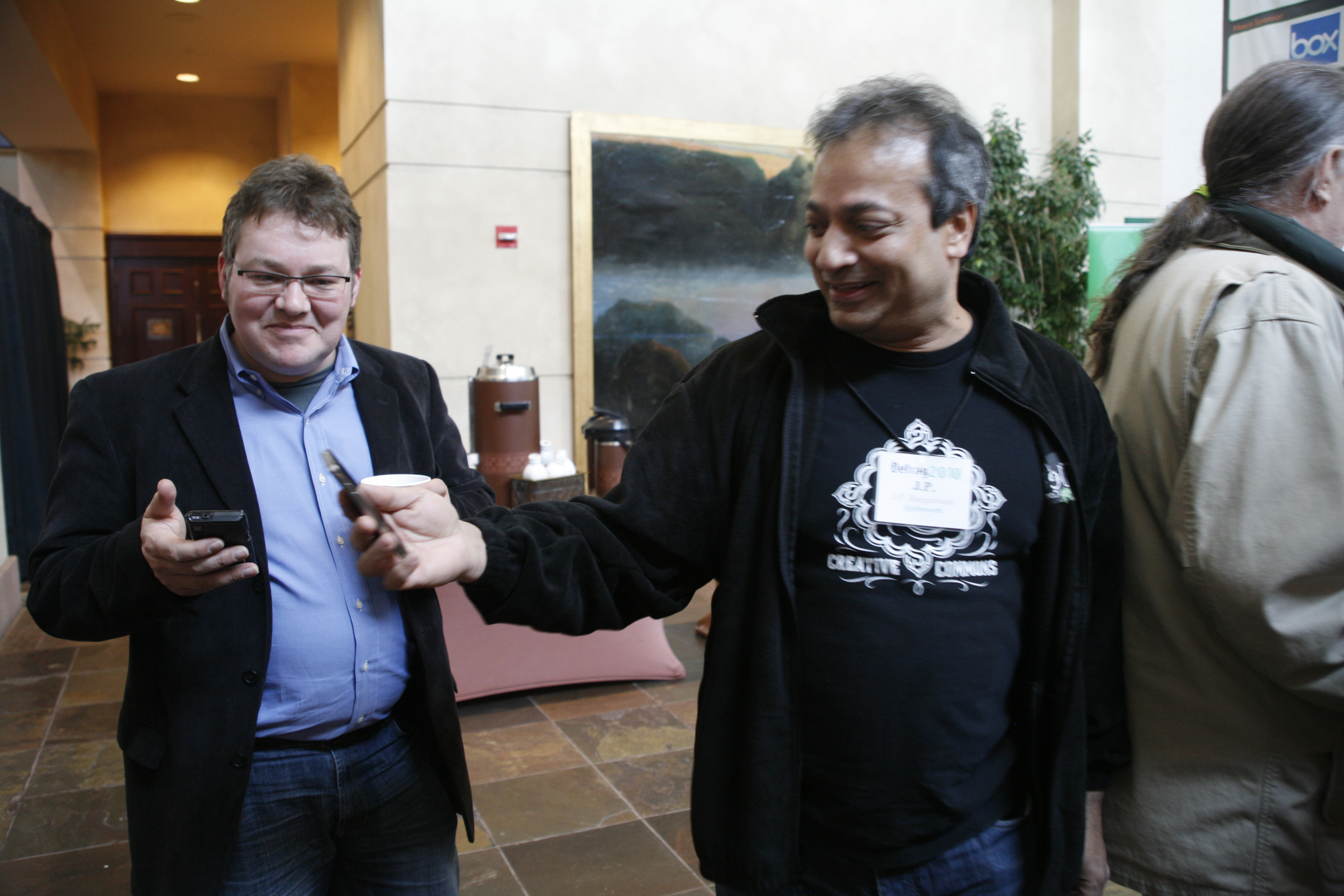
Kevin Marks (left) and JP Rangaswami at Defrag 2010, Colorado USA

Kevin Marks is on the Advisory Council of the Open Rights Group, a UK-based Digital Rights campaigning organization and is an Open Web Advocate. He is one of the founders of Microformats.

Marks was listed at #13 in The Daily Telegraph's 50 most influential Britons in Technology.

== Career ==
Marks was Vice President of Web Services at BT. He became Principal Engineer for Technorati after working for both Apple and the BBC. At the TechCrunch event Realtime Stream Crunchup he announced that he would be joining BT to work together with JP Rangaswami. He worked at Salesforce.com from 2011 to 2013 as their VP of Open Cloud Standards.

At the first BloggerCon, Marks discussed the power curve as it applies to weblogs:

The net changes the power law of the media curve. If you look at relative popularity on the web, using something like Technorati, you get a power curve that goes all the way down gradually, to the bottom where you see pages that got just a single click. If you look at popularity in the "real" world — best-selling books, or top music — the power curve drops like a stone from a very high level. That's because in order to get a book published, or a piece of music recorded, you have to convince somebody that you're going to sell a million copies. You end up in a zero-sum game, where people pour enormous resources into being the number one, because number two is only half as good. The promise of the net is that the power of all those little links can outweigh the power of the top ten.

In 2003, Marks was an early experimenter with and contributor to the technologies that became popular under the names podcasting and iPodder in 2004.

At the 4 October 2003 BloggerCon, Marks demonstrated a program that downloaded RSS-enclosure audio files and transferred them to Apple's iTunes music player, which could then synchronize them onto an iPod. In his weblog post from the conference that day, Marks mentioned discussing the program with Adam Curry, who also blogged about their chat the next day.

Kevin previously worked for Google as a Developer Advocate on OpenSocial.

== Awards ==
- 2006 Best Blog Guide - Technorati - Web 2.0 Awards
- 2006 Best of Show - Technorati - SXSW Awards
- 2006 Best Technical Achievement - Technorati - SXSW Awards
- 2002 Primetime Emmy Engineering Award -Academy of Television Arts & Sciences for Final Cut Pro
- 1998 Best Paper presented at MacHack 'Personality & Code'
- 1997 Japanese Wildlife Television Festival Multimedia Award - Wide World of Animals
- 1997 DTi Information Society Creative Award - Matter Factory
- 1996 Wildscreen Multimedia Award - Wide World of Animals
- 1995 MacUser Award - Best Reference title - 3D Atlas
- 1995 EMMA award for Best Information and Reference - 3D Atlas
- 1995 EMMA award for Best Overall CD-ROM title - 3D Atlas
- 1995 BIMA Gold award for Best Reference title - 3D Atlas
- 1994 Prix Möbius International finalist - 3D Atlas
- 1993 BIMA European Gold award - Erd Sicht
