= Sebald =

Sebald is a given name and surname. Notable people with the name include:

== Given name ==
- Saint Sebaldus of Nuremberg
- Sebald Beham (1500–1550), German printmaker
- Sebald Bopp (died 1502), German painter
- Sebald Justinus Brugmans (1763–1819), Dutch botanist and physician
- Sebald Heyden (1499–1561), German musicologist
- Sebald Justinus Rutgers (1879–1961), Dutch Marxist theoretician and journalist
- Sebald Schnellmann (1936–1983), Swiss sprinter
- Sebald de Weert (1567–1603), Flemish captain and vice-admiral of the Dutch East India Company

== Surname ==
- Alexander Sebald (born 1996), German footballer
- Amalie Sebald (1787–1846), German singer
- Greg Sebald (born 1963), Greek bobsledder
- Greta Sebald (born 1965), Greek luger
- Hans Sebald, American professor of sociology
- Oskar Sebald (1929–2017), German botanist
- William J. Sebald (1901–1980), American diplomat
- Winfried Georg Sebald (1944–2001), German academic and writer

== See also ==
- Saint Sebald, Iowa
- Seabold
- Sebold
- Seibold
- Siebold
