= Open-source warfare =

Open-source warfare is a method of warfare in which many small, autonomous groups can work together—without a formal means of coordination. The term was coined in Robb's Brave New War published in April 2007.

== Origin and press coverage ==
The term was developed by the author, analyst, and entrepreneur John Robb. Early usage of the term and the concept it represents appear in:

- "The Bazaar's Open Source Platform" on the Global Guerrillas blog on 24 September 2004.
- The Open-Source War" The New York Times, Op-Ed. 15 October 2005.
- Open-Source Warfare, IEEE Spectrum November 2007.
- "John Robb Interview: Open-Source Warfare & Resilience" Boing Boing 15 June 2012.

== "Brave New War" 's reception ==
Robb's Brave New War, was published in April 2007. It introduced the concept of open-source warfare and explored its implications.

Brave New War was well received. Noah Shachtman, editor of Wired magazine's Danger Room, said in 2007, "For years, now, no one has had a better read on the enemies that America has been fighting – from Afghanistan to Iraq to Indonesia to here at home – than John Robb." G Gordon Liddy, the Watergate conspirator said "this is a seminal book in the truest sense of the term ... way ahead of the curve ..." Frank Hoffman, a senior research fellow at the National Defense University said, "Without reservation, Brave New War is for professional students of irregular warfare and for any citizen who wants to understand emerging trends and the dark potential of 4GW." John Passacantando, the executive director of US Greenpeace, "read it twice and bought six copies for my friends."

== Scientific studies ==
The conceptual architecture of open-source warfare has been studied quantitatively. A recent study by Juan Camilo Bohorquez, Sean Gourley, Alexander R. Dixon, Michael Spagat, and Neil F. Johnson entitled "Common Ecology Quantifies Human Insurgency" explored dynamics of open-source insurgencies. It was published as the cover story for Nature magazine. Abstract:

"Many collective human activities, including violence, have been shown to exhibit universal patterns. The size distributions of casualties both in whole wars from 1816 to 1980 and terrorist attacks have separately been shown to follow approximate power-law distributions. However, the possibility of universal patterns ranging across wars in the size distribution or timing of within-conflict events has barely been explored. Here we show that the sizes and timing of violent events within different insurgent conflicts exhibit remarkable similarities. We propose a unified model of human insurgency that reproduces these commonalities, and explains conflict-specific variations quantitatively in terms of underlying rules of engagement. Our model treats each insurgent population as an ecology of dynamically evolving, self-organized groups following common decision-making processes. Our model is consistent with several recent hypotheses about modern insurgency, is robust to many generalizations, and establishes a quantitative connection between human insurgency, global terrorism and ecology. Its similarity to financial market models provides a surprising link between violent and non-violent forms of human behavior."
