= Sypolt =

Sypolt is a surname of German origin. It has its origins in the state of Bavaria and is the Americanized spelling of the German surnames Siebold, Seibold and Seipolt.

Notable people with the surname include:

- David Sypolt (born 1964), American politician
- Diane Gilbert Sypolt (born 1947), American judge
- Terri Funk Sypolt (born 1953), American politician

== See also ==
- Polt
