= Polt =

Polt is a surname. Notable people with the surname include:

- Gerhard Polt (born 1942), German writer, filmmaker, actor and satirical cabaret artist
- Michael C. Polt (born 1954), American diplomat
- Péter Polt (born 1955), Hungarian jurist
- Richard Polt (born 1964), American Philosophy professor

== See also ==
- POLT, the rail route Paris–Orléans–Limoges–Toulouse in France
- Sypolt, a surname
