= Seabold =

Seabold is a surname. Notable people with the name include:

- Elizabeth Harrower (actress) (1918–2003; full name Elizabeth Harrower Seabold), American actress and television writer
- Susan Seaforth Hayes (born 1943 as Susan Seabold), American dramatic actress, daughter of Elizabeth Harrower
- Connor Seabold (born 1996), American baseball player

== Other uses ==
- Seabold, Bainbridge Island, Washington, United States

== See also ==
- Seibold
- Siebold
- Sebald
- Sebold
