= San Francisco newspaper strike of 1994 =

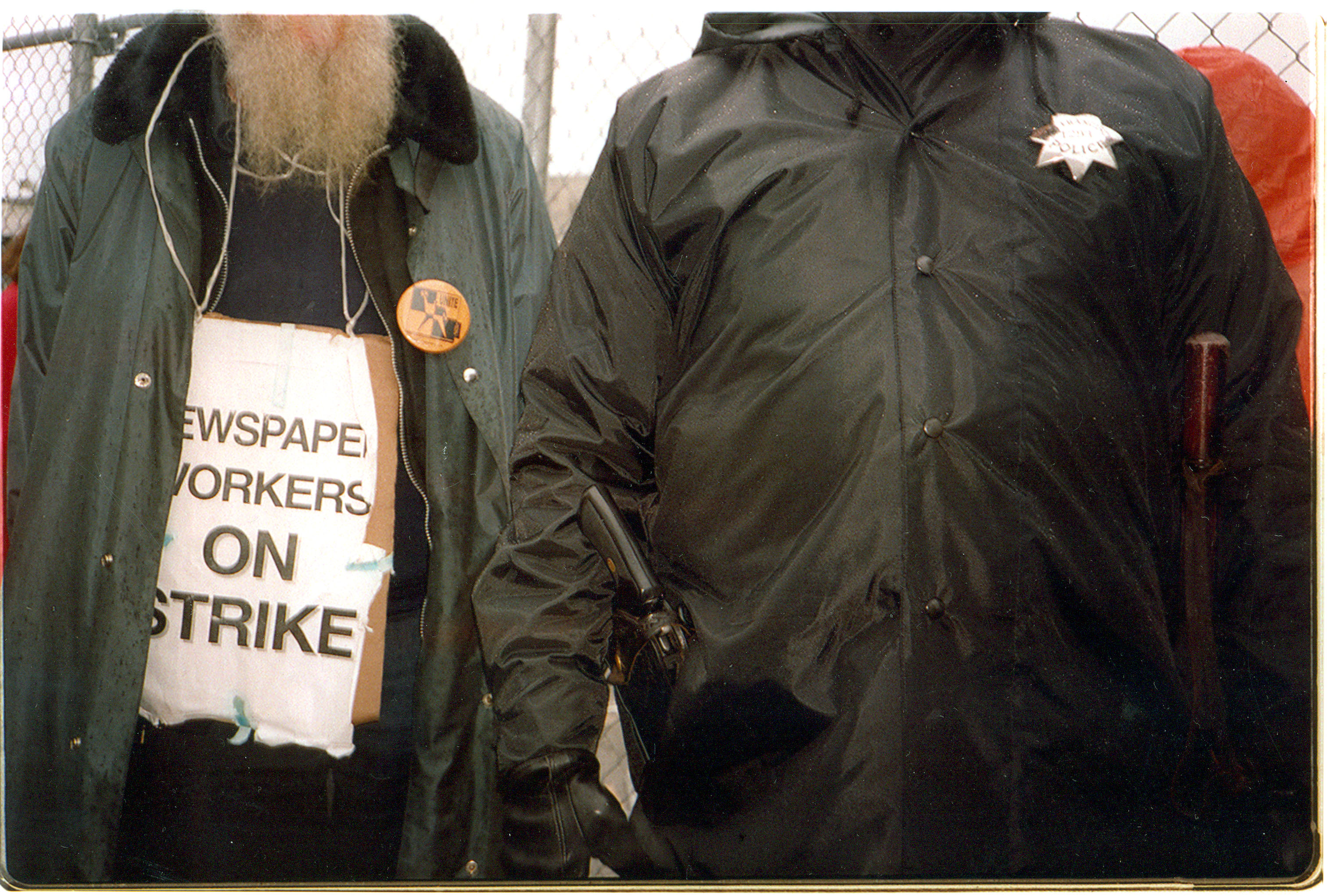
- Date: November 1--12, 1994
- Location: San Francisco

Parties
| Employees of San Francisco Chronicle and The San Francisco Examiner | Management |

The San Francisco newspaper strike of 1994 was a labor dispute called by the Newspaper Guild in November 1994. Employees of San Francisco's two major daily newspapers, the San Francisco Chronicle and The San Francisco Examiner walked off the job for eleven days.

== Leadup to the strike ==
San Francisco's two major daily newspapers were longtime rivals that had been working under a joint operating agreement since 1965. Employees had been working without a contract for the past year.

Wages were one major issue leading to the strike: while the unions demanded a 3.5 percent annual raise, management offered only a 2.46 percent annual raise over four years. Another point of contention was management's plan to cut the jobs of more than 150 teamster drivers over several years.

== The strike ==
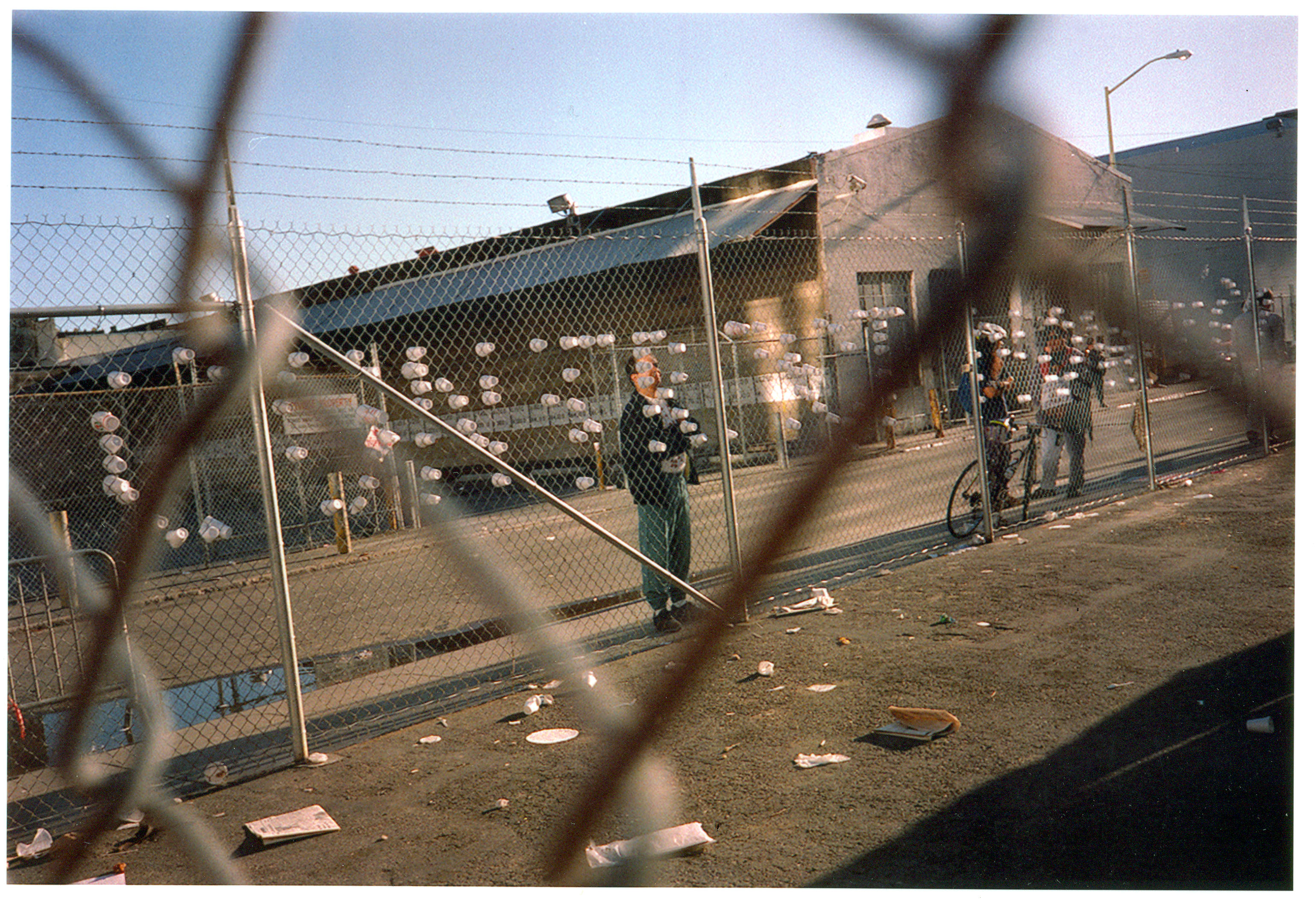
A protester spells out "CONTRACT" on fence with styrofoam cups during the strike

Starting on November 1, 1994, some 2,600 reporters, editors, drivers, press operators and paper handlers of the San Francisco Chronicle and The San Francisco Examiner walked off the job.

The strike turned violent. Bricks were thrown through paper carriers' windshields as they drove from the newspaper distribution center, and one non-union driver was hit on the head with a lead pipe, suffering a fractured skull. One teamster driver was killed by electricity when scaling a power pole.

=== Two online newspapers ===
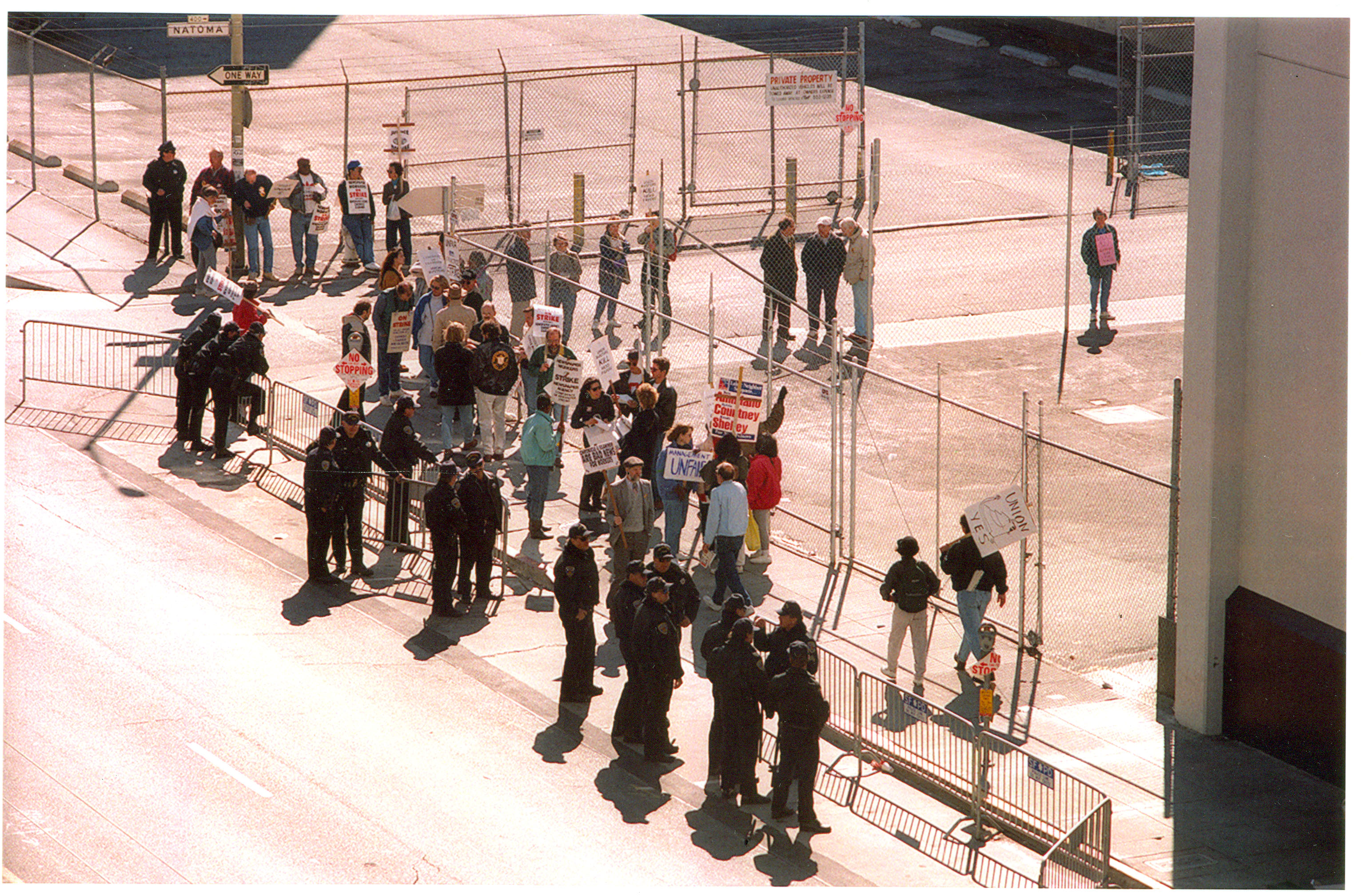
Members of Conference of Newspaper Unions march around the area behind the San Francisco Chronicle on November 3, 1994

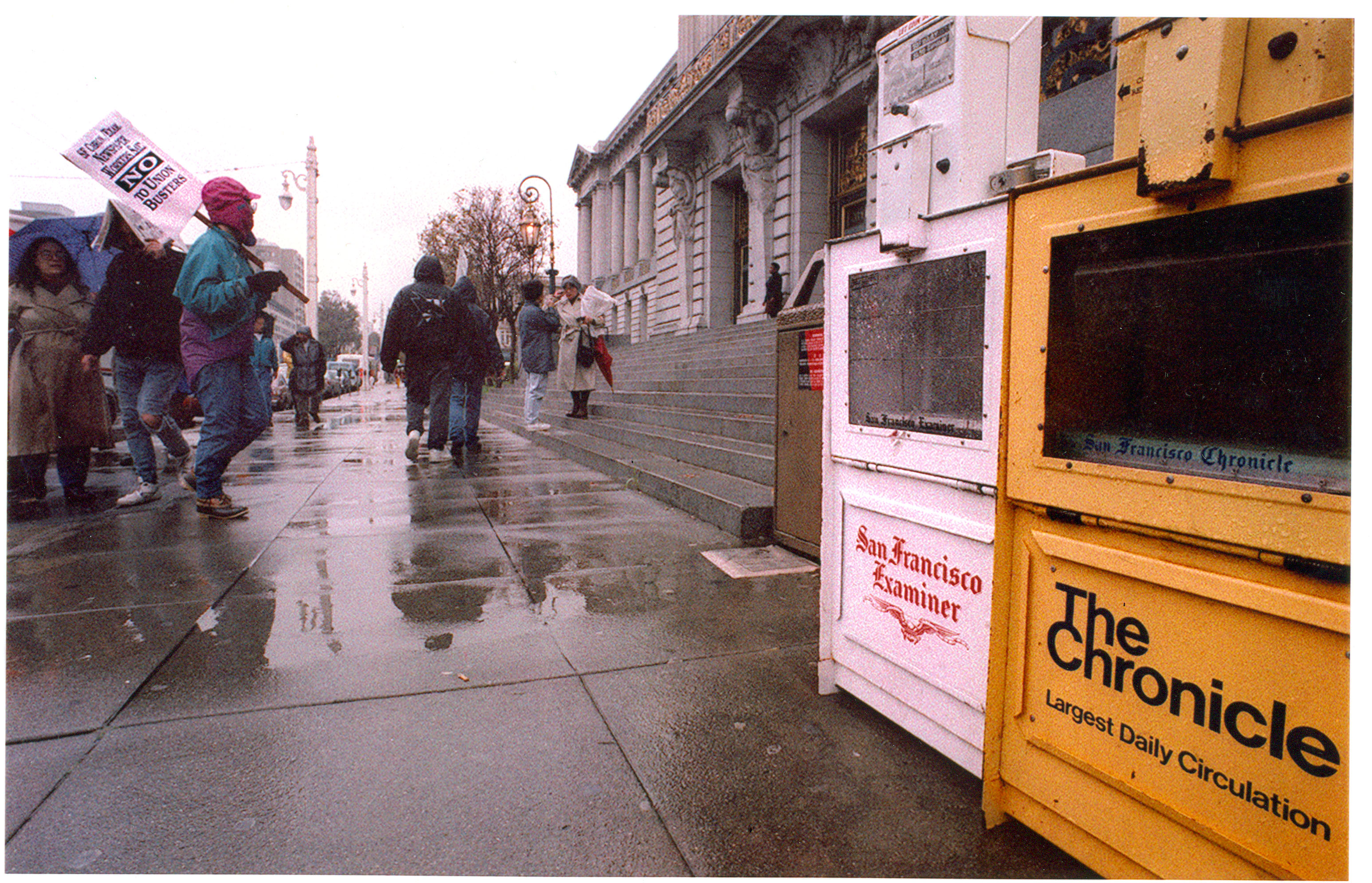
Union members protest in front of San Francisco's City Hall on November 5, 1994

At the beginning of the strike, The Examiner's Head of Development Chris Gulker re-launched his pilot web project called the Electric Examiner as The Gate, thus creating the official online version of San Francisco's two big newspapers. This news service, which remains in operation as the current-day SFGate, remained "heavily dependent on wire-service stories" for lack of contributing journalists and editors.

The striking journalists set up their own online newspaper, the San Francisco Free Press, and competed with The Gate as "the soul of the Examiner and the Chronicle." Led by the Examiner's Associate Editor Bruce Koon and former SF Weekly editor Marcelo Rodriguez, they received assistance from Cynsa Bonorris, who coded the html, and Dave Winer, who pitched in helping automate the production process. The team operated from a makeshift newsroom using their own hardware and a local ISP for rented server space.

The Free Press scored a scoop during its first week, reporting that Senator Dianne Feinstein had been wrongly accused of hiring an undocumented worker in the early 1980s.

During the strike both online newspapers were claiming a total of more than 100,000 readers a day, which was a fraction of the actual newspapers' estimated circulation of 600,000, but far beyond the 10,000 or so people in the Bay Area who had access to them.

== Negotiations and settlement ==
On November 12, 1994, after eight straight days of negotiations mediated by San Francisco Mayor Frank Jordan, the newspaper strike came to an end as management and a conference of eight unions announced a tentative agreement.

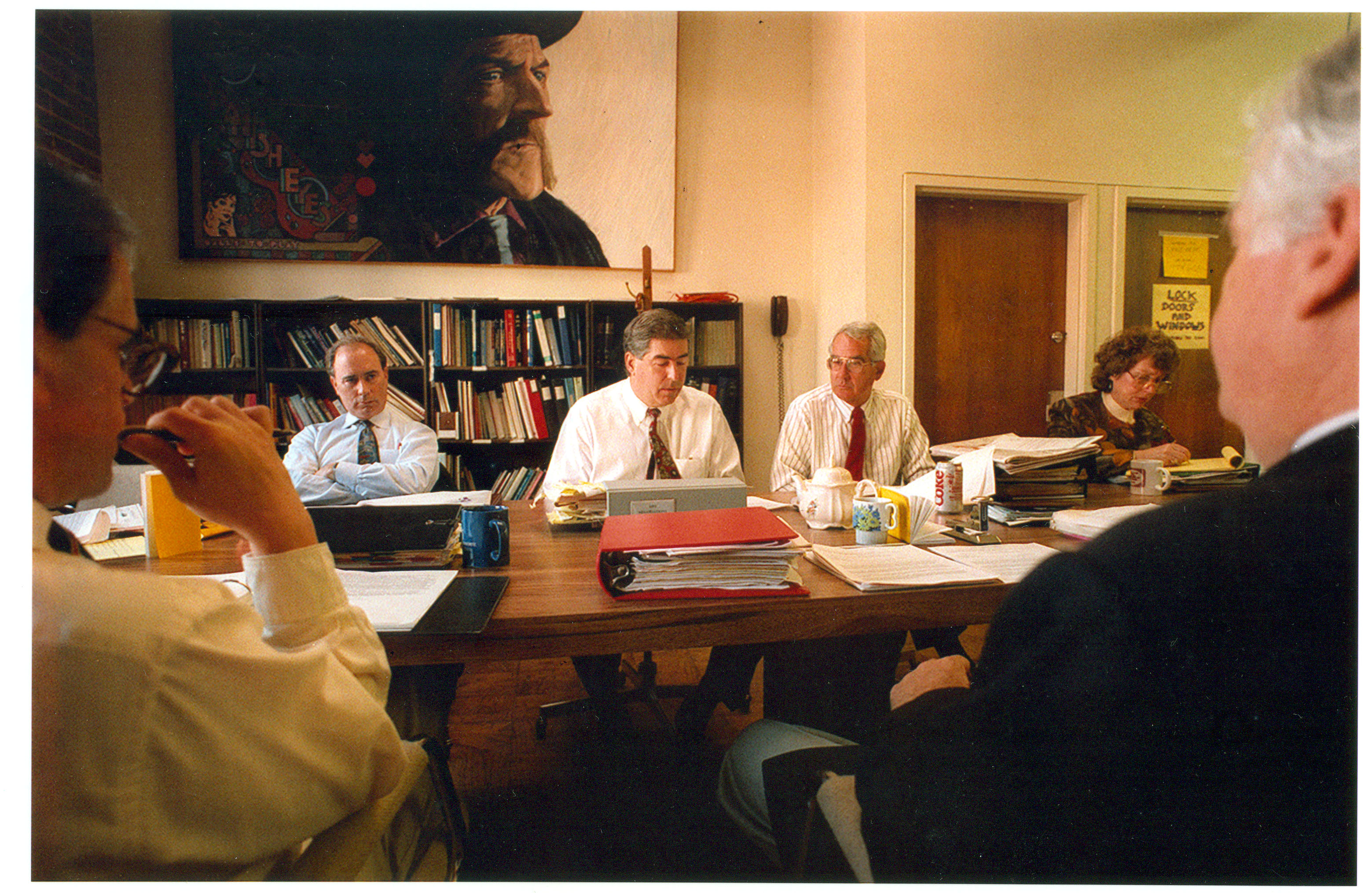
Some negotiations took place at the Newspaper Guild office at 433 Natoma Street in San Francisco.

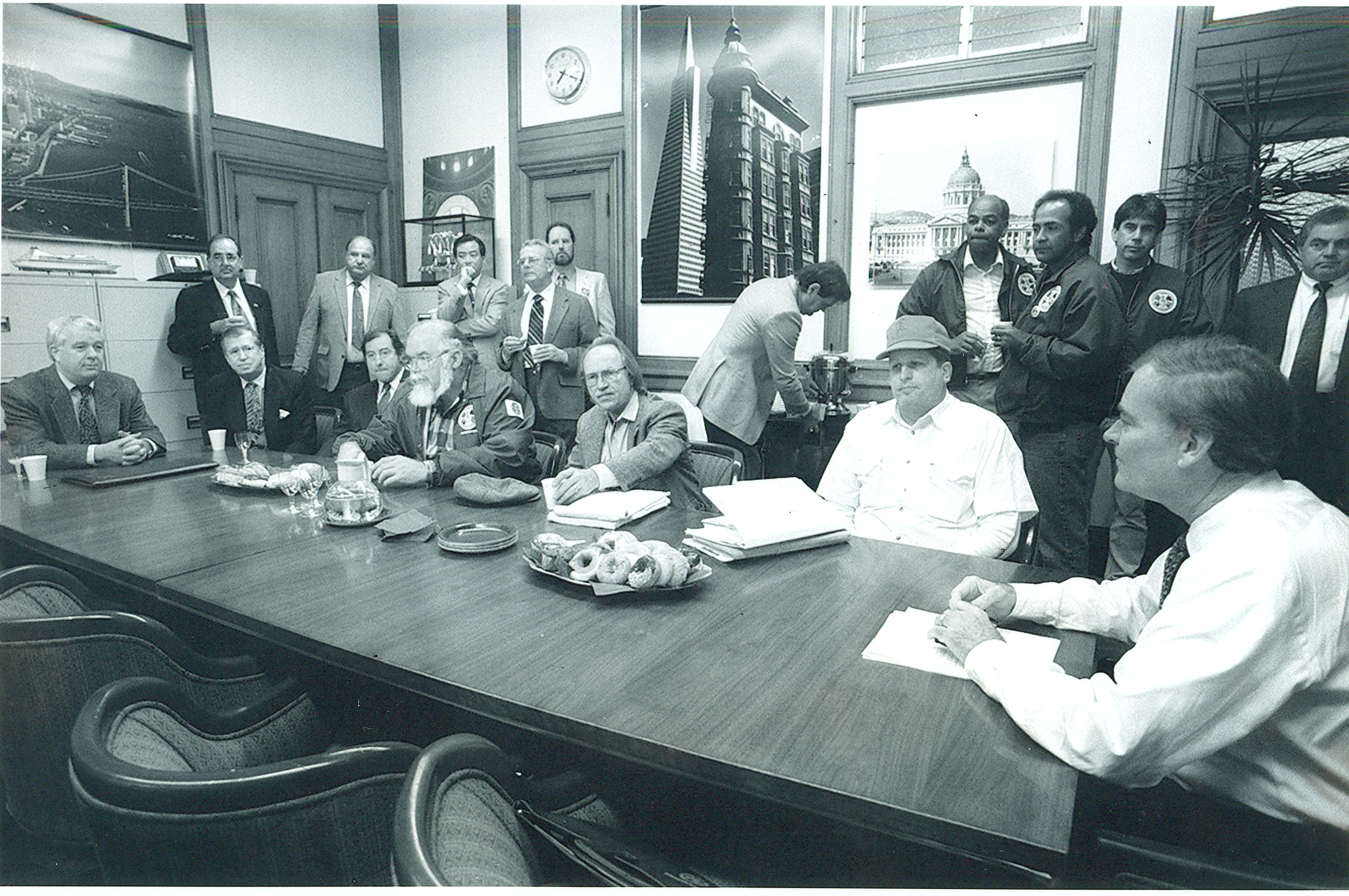
San Francisco Mayor Frank Jordan meets with union leaders at City Hall.

== Impact ==
The two competing electronic newspapers published during the strike have been hailed as "a milestone for online news," especially since the "speed and relative ease with which both groups published electronic newspapers was a clear demonstration of the power of computers and digital networks for distributing information to a potential audience of millions of computer users worldwide." The strike "put the web on the radar screens of news organizations" and triggered an "exodus" of Examiner staff to the web. Among them was David Talbot, who founded Salon.com after the Guild's online newspaper convinced him of the "potential of the new medium."
