= Siebold =

Siebold or von Siebold is a German surname. It is a patronymic surname derived from the given name Siebold, which consists of the Old High German words sigu ("Victory") and bold ("strong").

Notable people with the surname include:

- Carl Caspar von Siebold (1736–1807), German surgeon
- Regina von Siebold (1771–1849), German physician and obstetrician
- Adam Elias von Siebold (1775–1828), German gynaecologist
- Charlotte von Siebold (1788–1859), German physician
- Philipp Franz von Siebold (1796–1866), German physician, botanist and traveller
- Eduard Caspar Jacob von Siebold (1801–1861), German professor of gynecology
- Karl Theodor Ernst von Siebold (1804–1885), German physiologist and zoologist
- Alexander von Siebold (1846–1911), German translator and interpreter active in Japan
- Heinrich von Siebold (1852–1908), German diplomat and anthropologist
- Erika von Erhardt-Siebold (1890–1964), American literary scholar
- Klaus Siebold (1930–1995), German politician
- Percival Siebold (1917–1983), British scouting administrator
- Peter Siebold (born 1971), American commercial astronaut

== Other uses ==
- Siebold Sissingh (1899–1960), Dutch footballer
- SieboldHuis, museum in Leiden, Netherlands
- Siebold Memorial Museum, museum in Nagasaki, Japan
- Siebold typhoon, 1828 typhoon that struck Japan

== See also ==
- Seabold
- Sebald
- Sebold
- Seibold
- Sypolt
