= Don Box =

American computer engineer

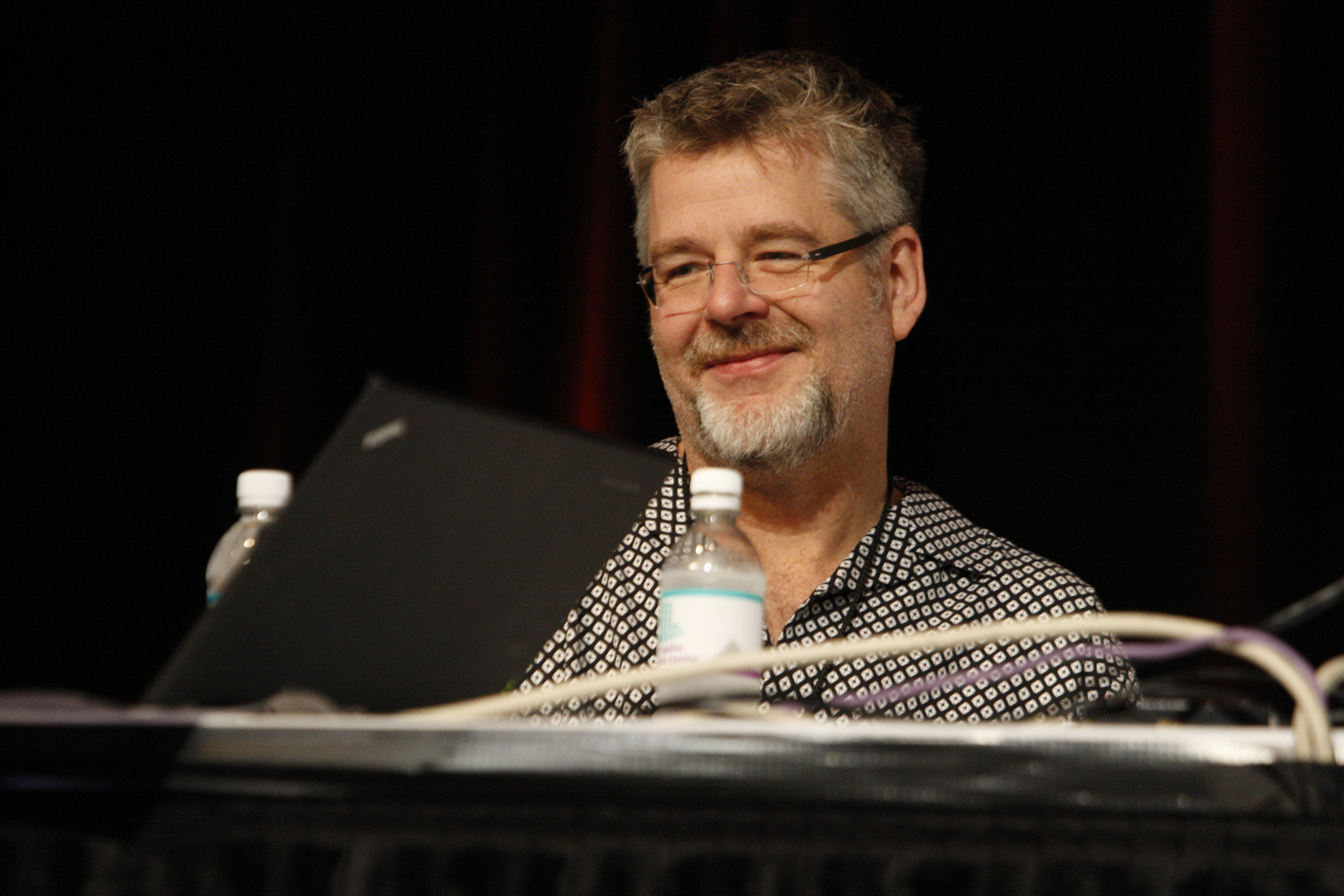
- Box in 2009
- Known for: Former Microsoft Technical Fellow

Don Box is a former Microsoft Technical Fellow.

Before joining Microsoft in 2002, Box was a contributing editor and columnist at Microsoft Systems Journal, which later became MSDN Magazine, and was one of the founders of DevelopMentor, a software training company; he left DevelopMentor to join Microsoft.

Box led the Xbox One platform development team from its inception through launch on November 22, 2013. Prior to that, Box led the development team that produced the Xbox SmartGlass platform (which was the basis for what is now known as Project Rome), worked on Brad Lovering's team working on model-driven runtime and tool support at Microsoft including "Oslo", and was an architect on Windows Communication Foundation (formerly known as "Indigo") and related technologies.

In from 2017 to 2021, Box was Vice President of Engineering for Mixed Reality, where he led the engineering team that builds HoloLens, Windows Mixed Reality, Windows Hello, and other initiatives that live at the edge of the physical and digital worlds.

From 2014 to 2017, he led the Silicon, Graphics and Media development team in the Windows and Devices Group, and was responsible for driving silicon/hardware/software co-engineering across the Windows product line. Leading up to the launch of Windows 10, Box drove the initiative to converge Windows, Windows Phone, Xbox, and HoloLens onto a common set of components known as OneCore.

On March 31, 2021, Box announced that he would be leaving Microsoft in May.

On May 3, 2021, Box joined Meta as VP of Engineering, AR Glasses, a position he stepped down from in 2023.

Along with Bob Atkinson, Mohsen Al-Ghosein, and Dave Winer, Box was one of the original four designers of SOAP, a basic messaging layer for web services. At 2001 TechEd Europe, Box performed a talk about XML and SOAP from a bathtub.

Box was a conspicuous figure in the Component Object Model (COM) community, where he coined the phrase "COM is love". He is also a series editor for Addison Wesley where he launched two successful series targeting the Microsoft developer audience.

== Books ==
- Essential .NET, Volume I: The Common Language Runtime, with Chris Sells
- Essential COM
- Essential XML: Beyond MarkUp
- Effective COM: 50 Ways to Improve Your COM and MTS-based Applications
