= Emsworth Locks and Dam =

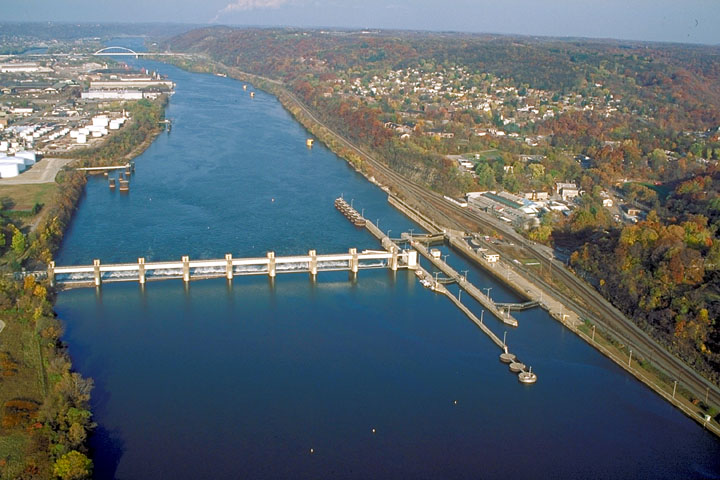
- Interactive map of Emsworth Locks and Dam
- Official name: Emsworth Locks and Dam
- Coordinates: 40.5033°N 80.0895°W
- Construction began: 1935
- Opening date: 1938
- Operator: United States Army Corps of Engineers Pittsburgh District

Dam and spillways
- Type of dam: Gated
- Impounds: Ohio River

Reservoir
- Normal elevation: 710 feet (220 m) above sea level

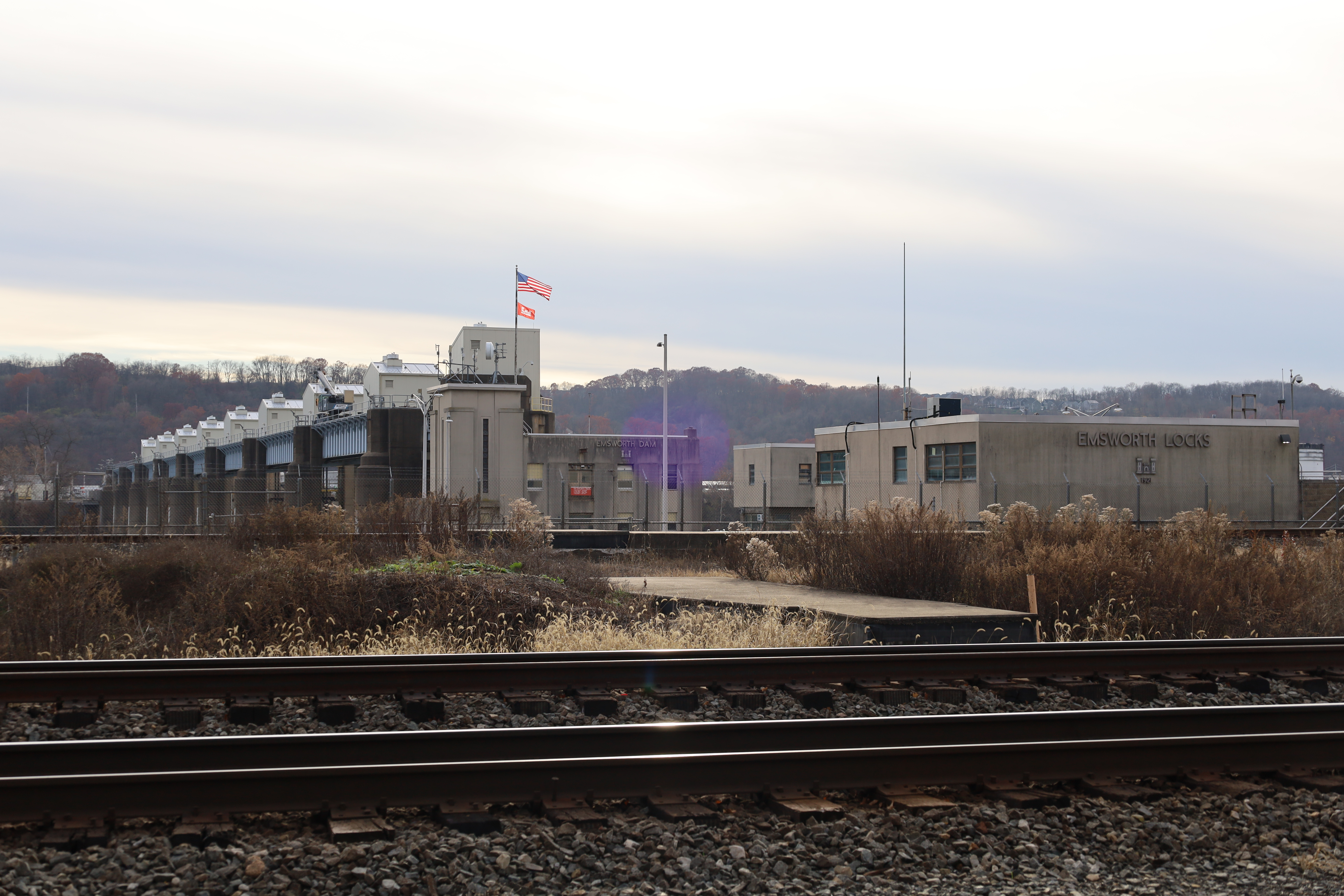
The dam in 2025

Emsworth Locks and Dam is a combination of locks and dams on the Ohio River located just downstream of Pittsburgh. The dam has two gated sections, one on each side of Neville Island. There are two locks, one for commercial barge traffic that is 600 feet (180 m) long by 110 feet (34 m) wide, and the recreational auxiliary lock that is 360 feet (110 m) long by 56 feet (17 m) wide. Emsworth averages about 470 commercial lock-throughs every month and 350 to 400 lock-throughs a month on the recreational auxiliary lock.

== See also ==
- List of locks and dams of the Ohio River
- List of locks and dams of the Upper Mississippi River
