= Seibold =

Seibold is a surname of German origin. It is a patronymic surname derived from the Old High German given name Siebold with a sound change (ī > ei).

Notable people with the surname include:

- Anthony Seibold (born 1974), Australian rugby union and rugby league coach and former player
- Champ Seibold (1911–1971), professional American football player
- Emil Seibold, recipient of the Knight's Cross of the Iron Cross
- Eugen Seibold (1918–2013), German marine geologist
- Günter Seibold (1936–2013), German football player
- Gerhard Seibold (born 1943), Austrian sprint canoeist
- Holly Seibold, American politician and educator
- J. Otto Seibold (born 1960), American illustrator, mainly of children's books
- Louis Seibold (1863–1945), American journalist
- Michaela Seibold (born 1975), German tennis player
- Rick Seibold (born 1983), American singer and songwriter
- Siegfried Seibold (born 1959), German wrestler
- Socks Seibold (1896–1965), American professional baseball pitcher
- Steven Seibold, American musician and founder of the band Hate Dept.
- Werner Seibold (1948–2012), German wrestler

== See also ==
- Eugen Seibold, German research ship
- Siebold
- Seabold
- Sebald
- Sebold
- Sypolt
