= BloggerCon =

BloggerCon was a user-focused conference for the blogger community that ran between 2003 and 2006. BloggerCon I (October 2003) and II (April 2004), were organized by Dave Winer and friends at Harvard Law School's Berkman Center for the Internet and Society in Cambridge, Massachusetts BloggerCon III took place in San Francisco in June 2006. According to the Online Journalism Review, "BloggerCon has lots of cooks, but the chief chef is technologist Dave Winer, co-founder of RSS and the patient zero of blogging. BloggerCon exists because Winer wants it to happen."

BloggerCon I was initially planned to be financed without corporate sponsors by charging $500 to attend. This plan sparked controversy. A second, free day was later added to the program. For BloggerCon II and III, there was no registration cost; the conference was funded by voluntary contributions from attendees.

On the first, paid day of BloggerCon I, four panels discussed the interaction of blogging with journalism, education, marketing, and presidential politics. The second day's panels included various technical and infrastructure issues such as RSS, news aggregators, and what was then called "audioblogging". The first BloggerCon brought together audioblogging pioneers with developers, whose collective efforts led to the phenomenon that spread six months later under the name podcasting.

For BloggerCon II, the format was changed to create an unconference, with audience participation sessions, loosely moderated by a discussion leader, rather than formal panels or keynotes. One invited participant, Iranian blogger Hossein Derakhshan, was unable to get a visa. He and others were still able to participate in the discussion via an IRC channel projected on a screen.

BloggerCon III met at Stanford Law School on November 6, 2004. Popular sessions included "Podcasting" with Adam Curry, "Overload" with Robert Scoble, and "Making Money" with Doc Searls. It was broadcast with help from ITConversations. Many also participated using IRC.

BloggerCon IV took place in San Francisco on June 23–24, 2006.
