= Living Videotext =

Former US software company

- Industry: Computer software
- Founded: Mountain View, California
- Founder: Dave Winer
- Fate: Acquired by Symantec
- Products: ThinkTank, Ready, MORE

Living Videotext was a software development company founded by Dave Winer in 1983. Its slogan was "We Make Shitty Software... With Bugs!," although the slogan was never publicly run in an ad.

Located in Palo Alto, California, the company was founded to sell an outliner called ThinkTank for the Apple II. This product was based on ideas that Winer had been developing for a few years since University. Winer ported the application to run on IBM PC compatible computers and after seeing a demo of Apple Inc.'s near-release Macintosh, Winer hired his brother Peter Winer to develop a version of ThinkTank for the Macintosh, which by April 1985 had sold 30,000 copies, or to about 10% of all Mac owners. Doug Baron was also hired to work on the Macintosh version of ThinkTank.

Work began on another outliner application at the end of 1984 called MORE, which expanded on the graphical concepts that they had started to add to ThinkTank, for example letting users easily convert outlines into bullet charts to be used in presentations.

By 1986, the company had grown to fifty people. The company underwent temporary financial difficulties which were resolved upon the release of MORE in 1986.

Before merging with Symantec, Winer first met with Bill Gates, the co-founder and then-President, CEO, and chair of Microsoft, in February 1987. Gates wrote a letter of intent to purchase the company in return for shares of Microsoft. However, the deal fell through and Microsoft instead purchased Living Videotext's competitor, Forethought, Inc., makers of Powerpoint, in a $14-million deal. Powerpoint went on to achieve widespread popularity as part of the Microsoft Office suite.

After receiving a number of other offers, Living Videotext merged with Symantec in September 1987. Many of its most popular products were, with Symantec's support, later released for free as "antique versions".
