= John W. Seybold =

John W. Seybold (March 8, 1916 – March 14, 2004) was a father of computer typesetting. His firm ROCAPPI (Research on Computer Applications in the Printing and Publishing Industries), started in 1963, was a pioneer in developing computer-based typesetting systems.

In 1971, along with his son Jonathan, he founded the Seybold Report, a newsletter that became highly influential in the publishing industry's transition to digital technologies. Their firm, Seybold Publications, later spawned a branch known as Seybold Seminars, which held conferences and trade shows focusing on the use of digital technologies in publishing (in its broadest sense as the dissemination of information, not limited to physical printing).

John's other children, Patricia and Andrew, set up their own consultancies. The Patricia Seybold Group (originally named Patricia Seybold's Office Computing Group) focuses on creating successful business strategies with the aid of technology; the Andrew Seybold Group specializes in mobile computing and wireless transmission of data.
