= Julio Gomez (businessman) =

Cuban-American businessman (born 1960)

Julio Gómez is an American entrepreneur and business analyst best known as the founder of Gomez Advisors (later Gomez, Inc.), an early web-performance benchmarking and monitoring firm acquired by Compuware for $295 million in 2009. He was an early commentator on online brokerage and e-finance usability.

== Early life and education ==
Gómez attended The Pennington School in New Jersey and graduated from Princeton University in 1982. He has been recognized by his secondary-school alma mater with induction into its Order of the Tower for alumni service.
