= Sebold =

Sebold is a surname. Notable people with the name include:

- Alice Sebold (born 1963), American writer
- Brooke Sebold, American filmmaker
- William G. Sebold (1899–1970), World War II double agent against Germany in the U.S.

== See also ==
- Seabold
- Sebald
- Seibold
- Siebold
