= John States Seybold =

United States Army general

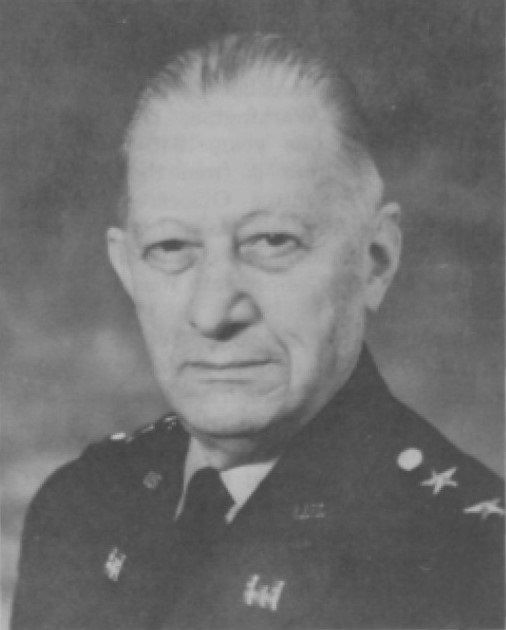
- Maj. Gen. John S. Seybold
- Born: July 2, 1897; Topeka, Kansas, U.S.
- Died: April 19, 1982 (aged 84); Washington, D.C., U.S.
- Military career
- Allegiance: United States of America
- Branch: United States Army
- Service years: 1920–1955
- Rank: Major General
- Commands: Governor of the Panama Canal Zone
- Conflicts: World War II
- Awards: Legion of Merit; Bronze Star Medal

John States Seybold (July 2, 1897 – April 19, 1982) was an American military officer who was Governor of the Panama Canal Zone from 1952 to 1956.

== Biography ==
Seybold was born on July 2, 1897, in Topeka, Kansas. He attended Polk Grade School and graduated from Topeka High School. Seybold then studied at the University of Kansas for two years before entering the United States Military Academy in June 1918.

Seybold graduated from West Point in June 1920. He was commissioned a second lieutenant in the U.S. Army Coast Artillery Corps, and later transferred to the U.S. Army Corps of Engineers. He earned a B.S. degree in civil engineering at the Rensselaer Polytechnic Institute in June 1922. Seybold served with the 11th Engineers in the Panama Canal Zone from November 1922 to October 1925.

Seybold commanded a company in the 1st Engineers at Fort Hancock, New Jersey, from November 1925 to June 1927. He taught military science and tactics at Texas A&M College from September 1928 to July 1934. Seybold then served as an assistant to the district engineer in Vicksburg, Mississippi, until May 1938. He was subsequently assigned to the Corps of Engineers headquarters staff in Washington, D.C.

During World War II, Seybold served in North Africa and Europe from April 1943 to May 1945, earning the Legion of Merit and the Bronze Star Medal.

After the war, Seybold served as district engineer in Syracuse, New York, Baltimore, Maryland, and Bismarck, North Dakota. He then served as division engineer in Omaha, Nebraska, and San Francisco, California. Seybold became chief of personnel at Corps of Engineers headquarters in May 1951. He was promoted to brigadier general on June 30, 1951.

Seybold served as Governor of the Panama Canal Zone from 1952 to 1956. Seybold hosted Queen Elizabeth II's first-ever state visit when she visited the Canal Zone in November 1953.

Seybold retired from active duty in the Army on November 30, 1955, and was advanced to major general on the retired list. He then completed his four-year term as governor in May 1956.

Seybold lived in Washington, D.C., after retirement and died on April 19, 1982, at Sibley Hospital. He was interred at Arlington National Cemetery three days later.

Preceded by Francis K. Newcomer	Governor of Panama Canal Zone; 1952–1956	Succeeded by William E. Potter
