= Seybold Seminars =

- Status: Inactive
- Genre: publishing conference and trade show
- Country: United States
- Inaugurated: 1981
- Most recent: 2005

Seybold Seminars was a series of seminars and trade shows for the desktop publishing and pre-press industries in the 1980s and 1990s . They were founded in 1981 by Jonathan Seybold, son of John W. Seybold, and were associated with Seybold Publications.

Seybold Seminars focused on electronic publishing, printing and graphics. Its biannual events covered the industry in rapid transformation by computing technology. They provided forums for theoretical discussions and practical applications of that technology. Initially focusing on the issues surrounding computers delivering images and text to print, the Seminars came to deal with multimedia, online publishing, and rapid advances in color technology. The web became a dominant concern in May 1995.

The seminars were described as "milestones for designers, developers, and production folks of all stripes in their struggle to understand what is going on with the technology" and as "must-attend venues where all of the most important announcements about desktop publishing, computerized print production, and, eventually, Web-based publishing routinely were made."

Craig Cline served as vice president of content development for the Seminars.

Attendance at the Seminars began to decline in 2001 and continued to slide until the event was discontinued in 2005.
