= Radio UserLand =

- Developer: Userland Software
- Final release: 8.1 / September 6, 2005; 21 years ago
- Operating system: Windows, Mac OS X, Mac OS 7.5.5 or greater
- Platform: Frontier
- Type: Blog publishing system
- License: proprietary
- Website: radio.userland.com

Radio UserLand is a software package from UserLand Software, first released in 2000, which includes not only a client-side blogging tool but also an RSS aggregator, an outliner and a scripting language.

== Features ==
Radio UserLand is an offspring of UserLand's Manila, which is built on the Frontier platform. It uses a desktop client to store the full content of a user's weblog on the user's computer, and provides a mechanism for uploading it to a shared server. Server space at UserLand's radio.weblogs.com site was included in the annual registration fee from the start, and continued after UserLand's founder sold most of weblogs.com to VeriSign in 2005. Radio users also have the option of uploading their weblog content to a server at another Web hosting service.

Radio blog content can be organized into categories with separate RSS feeds; categories also can be assigned to separate page templates and servers.

Radio UserLand has been praised for its ease of use.

== Release history ==
Radio Userland was first presented in a demo under the name "Pike" in March 2000. Major releases include Radio [7.0] in March 2001 and Radio 8.0 in January 2002. The most recent release was version 8.2 of September 2005. With the exception of minor fixes, the software is no longer under active development but continues to be sold and supported by UserLand.

In June 2009, Userland Software announced that the Radio Userland service would be closing at the end of 2009.

== Podcasting ==
Radio was the first commercially available program to enable the "RSS enclosure" method of delivering audio or video files, the basis of what came to be known as podcasting several years after the feature was introduced.
