= TreeLine (outliner) =

2001 software

- Original author: Doug Bell
- Initial release: 17 October 2001; 24 years ago
- Stable release: 3.2.1 / September, 2025
- Written in: Python
- Platform: Linux, Windows
- Available in: English, French, German
- Type: Outliner, Personal information manager, XML editor
- License: GNU General Public License
- Website: treeline.bellz.org

TreeLine is a free and simple outliner with advanced data element definition and export abilities. It uses a basic tree structure to organize information, and allows the user to define different types of nodes and leaves.

== File formats ==
=== Export ===
TreeLine outlines can be exported as HTML, per-data type user defined formatting. In addition, it supports exporting outlines as an OpenDocument ODT file, OPML, various delimited text file formats, and as "plain" XML.

=== Import ===
TreeLine can import plain text, tab indented, delimited table files, Mozilla and XBEL format bookmarks, generic XML files, ODF text documents and older TreeLine formats.

=== File format ===
TreeLine uses a simple JSON syntax to store data, with .trln extension. Versions before 3.0.0 used XML symtax with .trl extension.

== Similar programs ==
- Zim
- Wixi
- KeepNote
- KJots
- Tomboy
- Notecase
- Gnudiary
- GNote
- Tiddlywiki
