= OSF =

OSF may refer to:

== Computing ==
- Open Science Framework, a cloud-based management for open access science
- Open Semantic Framework, an integrated software stack using semantic technologies for knowledge management
- OSF/1, a Unix-like operating system developed by the Open Software Foundation
- Opera Show Format, an XHTML-based slideshow format

== Organisations ==
- Ógra Shinn Féin, the youth wing of the Sinn Féin political party
- Open Software Foundation, a not-for-profit organization that merged with X/Open and then became The Open Group
- Open Society Foundations, a grantmaking body established by George Soros
- OpenStack Foundation, a non-profit corporate entity to promote OpenStack software and its community
- Operational Support Facility, of the Federal Aviation Administration
- Oregon Shakespeare Festival, a repertory theatre in Ashland, Oregon, US
- Oxford Scientific Films, a British producer of natural history and documentary programmes
- The Old Spaghetti Factory, a restaurant chain
- Independent Senate Fraction (Onafhankelijke Senaatsfractie), a political group of the Netherlands
- Order of Saint Francis, a 21st-century American Franciscan religious order; see Franciscan spirituality in Protestantism § Anglican Communion
- Oklahoma Office of State Finance, an agency of the Government of Oklahoma, US
- OSF Global Services, a cloud technology company
- OSF Healthcare, a non-profit healthcare organization in Illinois and Michigan, US
