= Rubrikk Group =

Rubrikk Group AS
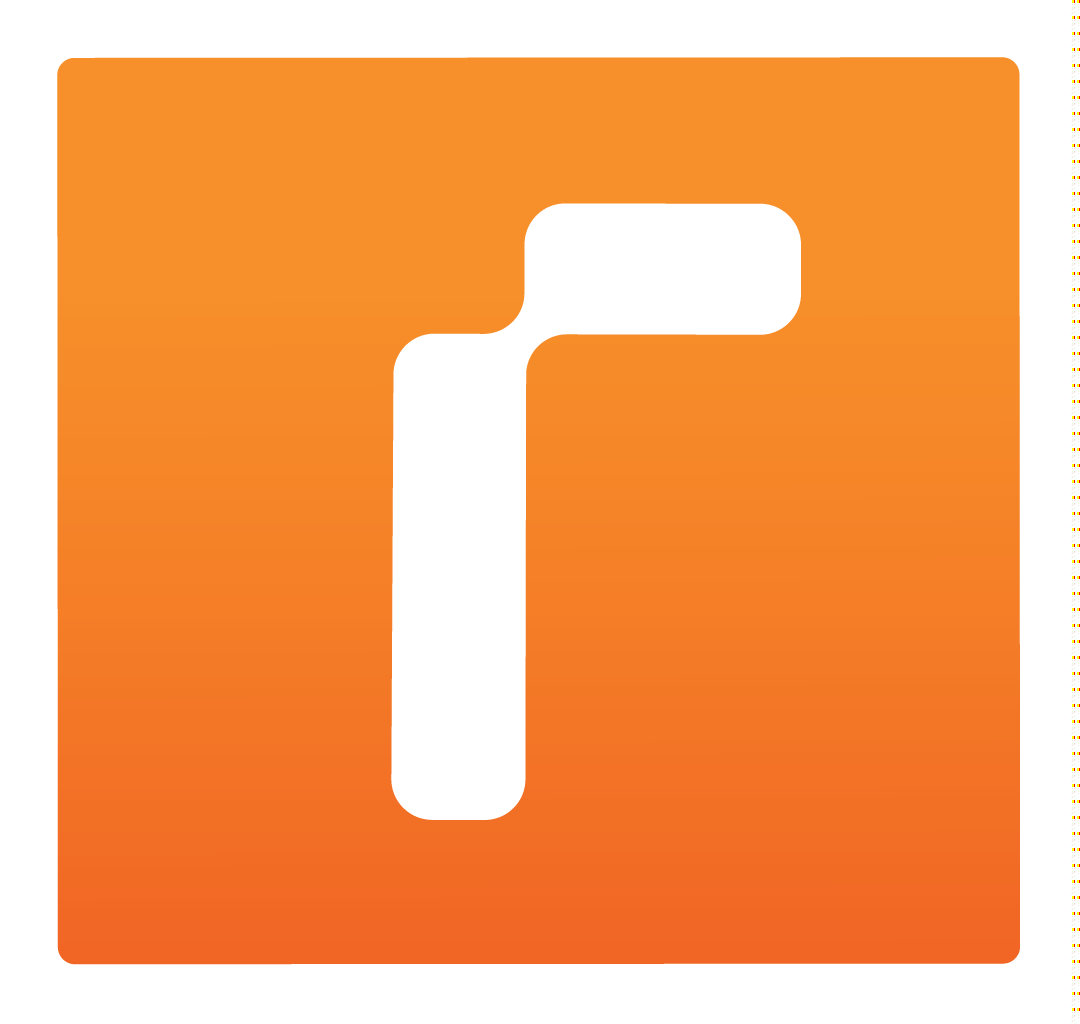
- Company type: Private
- Industry: Internet
- Founded: 2001
- Founder: Adil Osmani and Sigbjørn Rivelsrud
- Headquarters: Oslo, Norway - Cluj, Romania
- Area served: Worldwide
- Website: www.rubrikkgroup.com

Rubrikk Group AS is a company that owns and operates the search engine RUBRIKK.NO in Norway, and similar services in other countries. The company was founded in 2001 by Adil Osmani and Sigbjørn Rivelsrud. Its headquarters are in Oslo, Norway. In 2020 Rubrikk Group had a turnover of 50.1 million NOK and a profit of 4.5 million NOK. Rubrikk also links to other classifieds websites such as Finn, eBay, kijiji, OLX, Mercadolibre, Yatbo, Quoka, Markt.de, Immonet, and Mobile.de The company began its internationalization process in 2011 where, among other South Africa was launched. The company has 2 subsidiaries called Laikado and Milendia. The company has now launched services in 12 countries.

== Partners ==
Rubrikk Group works in partnership with the following companies:

- NewsNow (United Kingdom)
- Ananzi (South Africa)
- Focus Online (Germany)
- Italiaonline (Italy)

== Classifieds categories ==
The classifieds categories Rubrikk offers are as follows:

- Properties
- Cars & Vehicles
- Jobs
- Pets

== Sites worldwide ==
=== Europe ===
Country	Website	Year established
Germany	Focus Kleinanzeigen	2014
Norway	Rubrikk.no	1999
Switzerland	Allekleinanzeigen.ch	2015
United Kingdom	NewsNow Classifieds	2013
Romania	Oferte360.ro	2017
Italy	Libero Annunci	2020
Spain	Laikado.es	2023

=== America ===
Country	Website	Year established
Mexico	Laikado.mx	2021
Canada	Allclassifieds.ca	2015

=== Asia and Oceania ===
Country	Website	Year established
Australia	Findads.com.au	2014

=== Africa ===
Country	Website	Year established
Kenya	The-star.co.ke/classifieds/	2015
South Africa	Ananzi Ads	2011
