= Vignoni =

Vignoni may refer to:

- David Vignoni (born 1980), an Italian graphic designer
- Bagno Vignoni, a village and spa town in Italy
