= Nuvoli =

Nuvoli is an Italian surname:

- Giovanni Nuvoli (1953–2007), Italian football referee
- Montanino Nuvoli (1931–1997), Italian rower
- Paolo Nuvoli (1935–2025), Italian politician
- Salvatore Nuvoli (1935–2010), Italian rower

== See also ==
- Nuvola
