= News aggregator =

Client software that aggregates syndicated web content

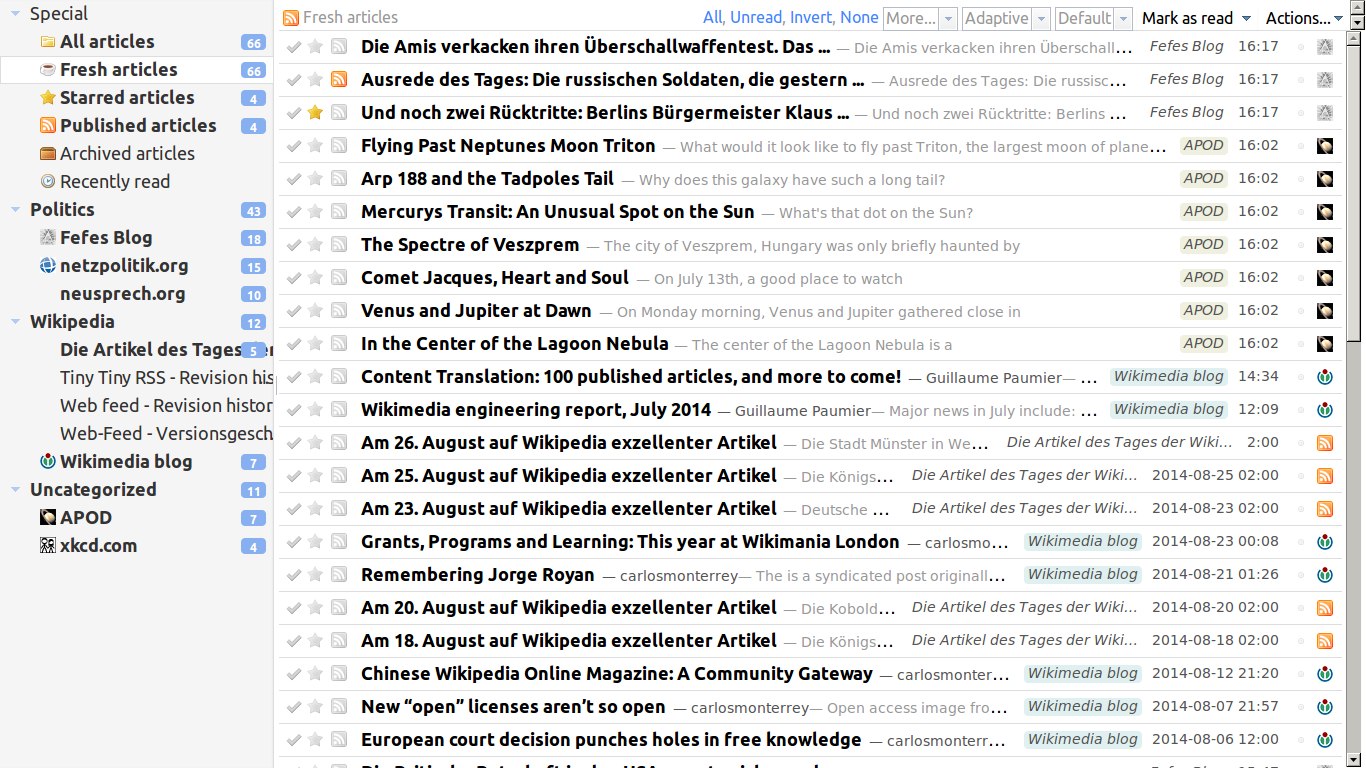
The user interface of the feed reader Tiny Tiny RSS

In computing, a news aggregator, also termed a feed aggregator, content aggregator, feed reader, news reader, or simply an aggregator, is client software or a web application that aggregates digital content such as online newspapers, blogs, podcasts, and video blogs (vlogs) in one location for easy viewing. The updates distributed may include journal tables of contents, podcasts, videos, and news items.

Contemporary news aggregators include Akregator, Feedly, Inoreader, and Mozilla Thunderbird.

== Function ==
The common web feed icon

Aggregation technology often consolidates (sometimes syndicated) web content into one page that can show only the new or updated information from many sites. Aggregators reduce the time and effort needed to regularly check websites for updates, creating a unique information space or personal newspaper. Once subscribed to a feed, an aggregator is able to check for new content at user-determined intervals and retrieve the update. The content is sometimes described as being pulled to the subscriber, as opposed to pushed with email or instant messaging. Unlike recipients of some push information, the aggregator user can easily unsubscribe from a feed. The feeds are often in the RSS or Atom formats which use Extensible Markup Language (XML) to structure pieces of information to be aggregated in a feed reader that displays the information in a user-friendly interface.

Before subscribing to a feed, users have to install either "feed reader" or "news aggregator" applications in order to read it. The aggregator provides a consolidated view of the content in one browser display or desktop application. "Desktop applications offer the advantages of a potentially richer user interface and of being able to provide some content even when the computer is not connected to the Internet. Web-based feed readers offer the great convenience of allowing users to access up-to-date feeds from any Internet-connected computer." Although some applications will have an automated process to subscribe to a news feed, the basic way to subscribe is by simply clicking on the web feed icon and/or text link. Aggregation features are frequently built into web portal sites, in the web browsers themselves, in email applications, or in application software designed specifically for reading feeds.

Aggregators with podcasting capabilities can automatically download media files, such as MP3 recordings. In some cases, these can be automatically loaded onto portable media players (like iPods) when they are connected to the end-users computer. By 2011, so-called RSS narrators appeared, which aggregated text-only news feeds, and converted them into audio recordings for offline listening. The syndicated contents an aggregator will retrieve and interpret is usually supplied in the form of RSS or other XML-formatted data, such as RDF/XML or Atom.

== History ==
RSS began in 1999 when it was first introduced by web browser pioneer Netscape. In the beginning, RSS was not a user-friendly gadget and it took some years to spread. "...RDF-based data model that people inside Netscape felt was too complicated for end users." The rise of RSS began in the early 2000s when the New York Times implemented RSS: "One of the first, most popular sites that offered users the option to subscribe to RSS feeds was the New York Times, and the company's implementation of the format was revered as the 'tipping point' that cemented RSS's position as a de facto standard." "In 2005, major players in the web browser market started integrating the technology directly into their products, including Microsoft's Internet Explorer, Mozilla Firefox and Apple's Safari." As of 2015, according to BuiltWith.com, there were 20,516,036 live websites using RSS.

== Types ==
Web aggregators gather material from a variety of sources for display in one location. They may additionally process the information after retrieval for individual clients. For instance, Google News gathers and publishes material independent of customers' needs while Awasu is created as an individual RSS tool to control and collect information according to clients' criteria. There are a variety of software applications and components available to collect, format, translate, and republish XML feeds, a demonstration of presentation-independent data.

=== News aggregation websites ===
A news aggregator provides and updates information from different sources in a systematized way. "Some news aggregator services also provide update services, whereby a user is regularly updated with the latest news on a chosen topic". Websites such as Google News, Yahoo News, Bing News, and NewsNow where aggregation is entirely automatic, using algorithms which carry out contextual analysis and group similar stories together. Websites such as Drudge Report and HuffPost supplement aggregated news headline RSS feeds from a number of reputable mainstream and alternative news outlets, while including their own articles in a separate section of the website.

News aggregation websites began with content selected and entered by humans, while automated selection algorithms were eventually developed to fill the content from a range of either automatically selected or manually added sources. Google News launched in 2002 using automated story selection, but humans could add sources to its search engine, while the older Yahoo News, as of 2005, used a combination of automated news crawlers and human editors.

=== Web-based feed readers ===
Web-based feeds readers allow users to find a web feed on the internet and add it to their feed reader. These are meant for personal use and are hosted on remote servers. Because the application is available via the web, it can be accessed anywhere by a user with an internet connection. There are even more specified web-based RSS readers.

More advanced methods of aggregating feeds are provided via Ajax coding techniques and XML components called web widgets. Ranging from full-fledged applications to small fragments of source code that can be integrated into larger programs, they allow users to aggregate OPML files, email services, documents, or feeds into one interface. Many customizable homepage and portal implementations provide such functionality.

In addition to aggregator services mainly for individual use, there are web applications that can be used to aggregate several blogs into one. One such variety—called planet sites—are used by online communities to aggregate community blogs in a centralized location. They are named after the Planet aggregator, a server application designed for this purpose.

=== Feed reader applications ===
Feed aggregation applications are installed on a PC, smartphone or tablet computer and designed to collect news and interest feed subscriptions and group them together using a user-friendly interface. The graphical user interface of such applications often closely resembles that of popular e-mail clients, using a three-panel composition in which subscriptions are grouped in a frame on the left, and individual entries are browsed, selected, and read in frames on the right.

Software aggregators can also take the form of news tickers which scroll feeds like ticker tape, alerters that display updates in windows as they are refreshed, web browser macro tools or as smaller components (sometimes called plugins or extensions), which can integrate feeds into the operating system or software applications such as a web browser.

=== Social news aggregators ===
Social news aggregators collect the most popular stories on the Internet, selected, edited, and proposed by a wide range of people. "In these social news aggregators, users submit news items (referred to as "stories"), communicate with peers through direct messages and comments, and collaboratively select and rate submitted stories to get to a real-time compilation of what is currently perceived as "hot" and popular on the Internet." Social news aggregators are based on engagement of community. Their responses, engagement level, and contribution to stories create the content and determine what will be generated as RSS feed.

=== Frame- and media-bias–aware news aggregators ===
Media bias and framing are concepts that fundamentally explain deliberate or accidental differences in news coverage. A simple example is comparing media coverage of a topic in two countries, which are in (armed) conflict with another: one can easily imagine that news outlets, particularly if state-controlled, will report differently or even contrarily on the same events (for instance, the Russo-Ukrainian War). While media bias and framing have been subject to manual research for a couple of decades in the social sciences, only recently have automated methods and systems been proposed to analyze and show such differences. Such systems make use of text-features, e.g., news aggregators that extract key phrases that describe a topic differently, or other features, such as matrix-based news aggregation, which spans a matrix over two dimensions, the first dimension being which country an article was published in, and the second being which country it is reporting on.

== Media aggregators ==
Media aggregators are sometimes referred to as podcatchers due to the popularity of the term podcast used to refer to a web feed containing audio or video. Media aggregators are client software or web-based applications which maintain subscriptions to feeds that contain audio or video media enclosures. They can be used to automatically download media, playback the media within the application interface, or synchronize media content with a portable media player. Multimedia aggregators are the current focus. EU launched the project Reveal This to embedded different media platforms in RSS system. "Integrated infrastructure that will allow the user to capture, store, semantically index, categorize and retrieve multimedia, and multilingual digital content across different sources – TV, radio, music, web, etc. The system will allow the user to personalize the service and will have semantic search, retrieval, summarization."

== Broadcatching ==
Broadcatching is a mechanism that automatically downloads BitTorrent files advertised through RSS feeds. Several BitTorrent client software applications such as Azureus and μTorrent have added the ability to broadcatch torrents of distributed multimedia through the aggregation of web feeds.

== Feed filtering ==
One of the problems with news aggregators is that the volume of articles can sometimes be overwhelming, especially when the user has many web feed subscriptions. As a solution, many feed readers allow users to tag each feed with one or more keywords which can be used to sort and filter the available articles into easily navigable categories. Another option is to import the user's Attention Profile to filter items based on their relevance to the user's interests.

== RSS and marketing ==
Some bloggers predicted the death of RSS when Google Reader was shut down. Later, however, RSS was considered more of a success as an appealing way to obtain information. "Feedly, likely the most popular RSS reader today, has gone from around 5,000 paid subscribers in 2013 to around 50,000 paid subscribers in early 2015 – that's a 900% increase for Feedly in two years." Customers use RSS to get information more easily while businesses take advantage of being able to spread announcements. "RSS serves as a delivery mechanism for websites to push online content to potential users and as an information aggregator and filter for users." However, it has been pointed out that in order to push the content RSS should be user-friendly to ensure proactive interaction so that the user can remain engaged without feeling "trapped", good design to avoid being overwhelmed by stale data, and optimization for both desktop and mobile use. RSS has a positive impact on marketing since it contributes to better search engine rankings, to building and maintaining brand awareness, and increasing site traffic.

== See also ==
- Content moderation
- Comparison of feed aggregators
- History of web syndication technology
- Lifestreaming
- Metasearch engine
- News syndicate
- Social media
- Social network aggregation
- Web feed
- Web syndication
