= Phil Morle =

Australian-based venture capital (born 1968)

Phil Morle (born 1968), is a Partner at Main Sequence Ventures, an Australian-based venture capital firm attached to the CSIRO. Prior to this, he was the co-founder and CEO of Pollenizer, an Australia-based company that builds early stage internet companies using lean startup techniques. Prior to co-founding Pollenizer, Phil held a number of positions in the internet sector working with startups and large companies. His most renowned role was as CTO of Kazaa, a popular peer-to-peer file sharing service that was shut down in the face of legal action from record companies. Morle began his career in theater and was a founder and artistic director of Kaos Theatre in Perth for ten years.

== Kazaa Years (2001–2003) ==
Morle was asked to redesign the Kazaa website in October 2001 as they were a client of Brilliant Digital, where he was employed. Kazaa was then owned by its originators Niklas Zennström and Janus Friis and the company was facing legal action from the Dutch music industry which was suing the company for copyright infringement. Sharman Networks bought out Kazaa in early 2002 and Morle was recruited as Director of Technology. Kazaa was the main beneficiary of the demise of the first version of Napster in the middle of 2001 and by the beginning of 2003 over 60 million copies had been downloaded. At one point Kazaa was one of the top ten most visited websites in the world.

Organisations such as the Recording Industry Association of America (RIAA) and the Australian Recording Industry Association (ARIA) took legal action against Kazaa, alleging that the company's products facilitated breaches of copyright in the Australian Federal Court. The court found that Kazaa had authorised users to infringe music industry copyright, though proceedings against Morle were dismissed. Kazaa was accused of bundling adware, spyware and malware with their software. In a 2003 interview with The Guardian, Morle described this as an urban myth spread by companies marketing anti-spyware. However, CNet's Download.com stopped hosting a download capacity for the program on its site because of malware packaged with the program. In his testimony before the Federal Court of Australia in December 2004, Morle testified that it was not technically possible to filter adult and illegal sexual content such as child pornography from underage users. This contradicted claims by Alan Morris, the Vice-President of the company to a Committee of the US Senate that the company's Adult Filter provided such a capacity.

== Post-Kazaa Years (2003–2007) ==
After leaving Kazaa, Morle worked in a number of roles in the internet industry, with a focus on startups. Companies he worked with included Yoick, YelloYello, Omnidrive, Prime, 3eep and Tangler. Morle was active in industry standards groups during this time, as one of the founders of Dataportability.org and a workgroup member of APML ( APML.org). He also helped produce an independent film "Mine" (2007).

== Pollenizer Years (2007–present) ==
Phil co-founded Pollenizer with Mick Liubinskas in 2007. In his five years at the helm of Pollenizer, he has helped co-found or scale up more than 30 businesses, including Spreets, a group buying site that was sold in 2010 to Australia-based Yahoo7 for $40M AUD. Phil is one of Asia's leading practitioners of lean startup techniques, an approach to product development that he promotes via frequent conference presentations and through Pollenizer's Academy training program.

== See also ==
- APML.org
- Dataportability.org
- Main Sequence Ventures
