= Checkvist =

- Developer(s): Kirill Maximov and Sasha Maximova
- Initial release: 3 August 2008
- Type: Productivity software
- Website: checkvist.com

Checkvist is a keyboard-focused online outliner. It was created in 2008. by Kirill Maximov and Sasha Maximova, who remain its main developers. It emerged as an experiment to develop a web-based productivity tool featuring the same kind of rich keyboard-based operation that code editors typically allow.

One of the distinguishing characteristics of Checkvist is the focus on primarily designing its functionality around the keyboard. Every action in the outliner is accessible via a dedicated shortcut, often making use of key sequences such as ee for editing a list item. Help pages, contextual cheatsheets and the ⇧ Shift⇧ Shift shortcut all allow accessing the breadth of available shortcuts.

Checkvist operates under a freemium model, and is funded solely by the money paid by subscribers to the pro version. The tool supports importing and exporting content in various formats, including plain text, HTML, and OPML, and supports inviting others to collaborate on lists.

== See also ==
- Outliner § Browser-based outliners
