= The Outliner of Giants =

- Developer(s): Angelic Informatics LTD
- Operating system: Microsoft Windows, Mac OS X, Linux, iOS, Android
- Type: Outliner
- License: Commercial
- Website: The Outliner of Giants website

The Outliner of Giants was commercial outlining software. Like other outliners, it allowed the user to create a document consisting of a series of nested lists. It was one of a number of browser-based outliners that are delivered as a web application, used through a web browser, rather than being installed as a stand-alone application.

The Outliner of Giants was released in 2009. The service was shut down on December 31, 2017 and only exports are allowed at this time.

== Feature set ==
Unlike most other browser-based outliners - which often focus on providing a minimum viable product - the Outliner of Giants had much of the functionality typically associated with a desktop outliner, such as the ability to use of columns to structure information. However, The Outliner of Giants did not support offline editing, requiring an active internet connection in order to make changes to an outline document.

=== Outlining ===
Like all outliners, The Outliner of Giants supported the creation of a hierarchy of items, with users modifying the parent-child relationship between items in order to structure a document. This included the ability to promote or demote items up or down the hierarchy, or move an item up or down a list of siblings on the same level.

The Outliner of Giants did not support the true cloning of items (where an item can appear to be in multiple places within the hierarchy at the same time), although it did support the copying of single or multiple nodes.

=== Import ===
The Outliner of Giants could import both plain text and the OPML XML format, which is commonly used to transfer data between outlining applications.

=== Editing ===
Outline documents could be edited using a WYSIWYG editor, as well as the Markdown, and Textile markup languages.

=== Annotation ===
The Outliner of Giants supported functions to annotate an outline, such as the ability to add colored labels, highlights and text, as well as tags and hashtags.

=== Collaboration ===
The Outliner of Giants supported real-time collaboration, where multiple users could edit the same document, and can see the changes made by another user as they happened.

=== Publication ===
Outlines created through The Outliner of Giants could be published directly online through the service, either as outlines, pages or in a blog format.

=== Export ===
The Outliner of Giants can export outline data as plain text, HTML, as well as directly to the Google Docs word processor.
