= Share icon =

User interface icon

A share icon is a user interface icon intended to convey to the user a button for performing a share action. Content platforms such as YouTube often include a share icon so that users can forward the content onto social media platforms or embed videos into their websites, thus increasing its view count.

== Share Icon ==
Share Icon

WordPress developer Alex King created the original Share Icon in 2006. ShareThis acquired the rights to this icon a year later, and eventually licensed it under four licenses: the share-alike GPL and LGPL, and the permissive BSD license and Creative Commons Attribution 2.5. ShareThis produces widgets for accessing social networking services from a single pop-up menu. This icon is trademarked and was cause for controversy due to it being subject to legal take-down notices despite its license.

== Open share icon ==
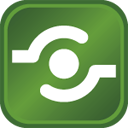
Open Share Icon

The Open Share Icon (or Shareaholic icon) is designed to help users easily identify shareable content. The icon aims to convey the act of sharing visually by representing one hand passing an object to another hand, while also representing an eye meaning "look at this." The icon was designed by the company Shareaholic, and made available under a Creative Commons share-alike license, with the restriction that "clear attribution and a hyperlink back to this page in a prominent location".

The Open Share Icon is supported by Ken Rossi (creator of the widely used OPML icons) and Bruce McKenzie (GeoTag icons), and is used by hundreds of websites and applications, including SmugMug, the Shareaholic Firefox addon, Wikia, NetworkWorld, Weather Underground, Princeton University. It is also proposed for use in the Mozilla Add-ons Directory.

== Rightward arrow icon ==
Facebook uses a share icon showing an arrow pointing up and then right.

The "share" button on Facebook covers several ways of sending the content with optional privacy settings to others. The "shares" button can generate more non-fans, and can result in fewer fans on a public Facebook page as a "brake effect of viral reach". The algorithmic content ranking on Facebook might decrease the fan reach in response to the notable increase in nonfan reach. Therefore, the "share" button may have a higher impact on content ranking than the previous "page like" button.

YouTube uses a similar icon.

== Upward arrow icon ==
Apple's products use an icon showing a box with an upward arrow. This icon is used on several Apple products:

- In iOS's iWork, for sharing work on iWork.com.
- In Mobile Safari, to show a menu of options: "Add Bookmark," "Add to Home Screen," "Mail Link to this Page," and "Print."
- In QuickTime X, to show the iTunes, MobileMe Gallery, YouTube, and trim options

Twitter shows a similar icon next to each tweet. This opens a menu with three options: Send via Direct Message, Add Tweet to Bookmarks, or Copy link to Tweet.

== See also ==
- Feed icon
- Like button
