= KAMAS (program) =

KAMAS (Knowledge and Mind Amplification System)
- Original author: Adam Trent
- Developers: Compusophic Systems; Kamasoft
- Initial release: 1984; 42 years ago
- Operating system: CP/M
- Platform: Zilog Z80
- Type: Outliner
- Website: http://kamasoft.com

KAMAS, an acronym for Knowledge and Mind Amplification System, from Compusophic Systems, then Kamasoft (Aloha, Oregon), was, in the 1980s the most influential outliner or outline processor, and the first for CP/M. It was a type of word processor that edited outline elements, enabling showing, hiding, promotion, demotion, and moving (cutting and pasting) of outline trees ("branches"). Each string of text occupied a "leaf". While some word processing programs included limited outline capability, some reviewers in the 1990s praised KAMAS' advanced features. A number of outline processors exist for MS-DOS, Microsoft Windows, and the Apple Mac platforms. None has achieved a significant market share, or the enthusiastic user base which supported KAMAS.

Adam Trent was president of Kamasoft and the central figure in the development of the program. The initial price was $147.

In addition to the outline processor, KAMAS was also released with a programming language, a threaded interpreter most similar to FORTH. It was found to be "complex and not easily learned," and most purchasers of KAMAS never used it.

A simpler version without the programming facilities, Out-Think, was released in 1986. The code was retooled for 8080 and NEC V20 and V30 compatibility (KAMAS required a Zilog Z80). The price was $69.95; the price for KAMAS had dropped to $99.95.

Some disks of auxiliary utility programs were sold.

KAMAS, released in 1984, was the last important application written for the CP/M operating system. Its "home" computer was the Kaypro. An MS-DOS version was released, without the programming language.

The only output was print, or an untagged file image of the printed output, which required extensive editing to import into a word processing program. Except for a limited export in the MS-DOS version to other outline processors such as ThinkTank, there was no file export mechanism preserving the outline structure, nor did any third party develop a converter.
