= Workflowy =

Outliner software

- WorkFlowy logo (June 2018)
- Developers: FunRoutine, Inc.
- Release: August 2, 2010
- Operating system: iOS, Android, Web, Cross-platform
- Type: Productivity software
- Website: workflowy.com

Workflowy is a web-based outliner created by Mike Turitzin and Jesse Patel at a Y Combinator startup camp. The idea for Workflowy arose from Patel’s prior work experience in project management and his frustration with the lack of useful tools.

The central feature of the app is a text-based nested list. Writing in The Guardian, novelist Emma Donoghue noted that this aspect of the software allows her to capture and organise "stray idea[s]".

The app operates on a freemium business model and its straightforward list-like interface has been described as "uncluttered." by PC World in 2013 and "minimalistically elegant" by The Atlantic in 2016. Since its launch Workflowy has developed what the Geek Wire describe as "a cult-like following."

== See also ==
- Org-mode
- Outliner
