= GrandView (software) =

- GrandView 2.0 splash screen
- Developer: Symantec
- Stable release: 2.0 / 1990
- Operating system: MS-DOS
- Type: Personal information management Outliner
- License: Proprietary

GrandView is an outlining and personal information management (PIM) application originally developed by Living Videotext. Living Videotext was acquired by Symantec in 1987. Grandview was sold until the early 1990s and is no longer supported by Symantec. It closely resembled PC-Outline, an outliner for IBM PCs of the 1980s, authored by John Friend. Grandview was derived from the same software.

== Reception ==
Stating that GrandView was "more than an outliner", BYTE in 1988 approved of its built-in word processor. While noting the software's complexity, the magazine concluded that "GrandView—once you get over the top of the learning curve—will save scads of time and money", with a "more than reasonable" $295 price. BYTE in 1989 listed GrandView as among the "Distinction" winners of the BYTE Awards, stating that it was "packed with goodies" and worth the time necessary to learn how to use it.

== See also ==
- Outliner
