= S5 (file format) =

- Filename extension: .xhtml, .html
- Internet media type: application/xhtml+xml text/html
- Developed by: Eric A. Meyer
- Type of format: Presentation program
- Extended from: Opera Show Format
- Open format?: Yes. Public Domain.
- Website: S5 homepage

S5 (Simple Standards-Based Slide Show System) is an XHTML-based file format for defining slideshows. It was created by Eric A. Meyer as an alternative to the browser-centric Opera Show Format. S5 is not a presentation program, but fulfills the same purpose in combination with a standards-compliant web browser.

== History ==
The initial version of S5 was released by Eric Meyer on October 18, 2004 under a Creative Commons license. With the release of version 1.1 on July 28, 2005, S5 was placed in the public domain.

On July 17, 2006, Ryan King launched s5project.org, "a new community site, dedicated to the S5 Presentation software".

On December 4, 2006, Andreas Gohr announced a DokuWiki plugin that converts Wiki markup to XHTML-compatible S5 presentations.

== Structure ==
The content of an S5 presentation can be stored in a single XHTML file. This file contains several slides which are structured in the following way:

<div class="slide">
 <h1>slide title</h1>
 <ul>
   <li>the first point</li>
   <li>the second point</li>
   <li>the third point</li>
 </ul>
 <div class="handout">
  ... additional material that appears
     on the handout
 </div>
</div>

S5 presentations can be viewed in outline and slideshow mode; Cascading Style Sheets are used to define different layouts for outline, slideshow and print. Navigation controls, a dynamically generated list of slides and accesskeys allow browsing back and forth.

A more semantic version of the S5 format is based on the XOXO microformat and uses <li class="slide"> instead of divs for the slides, as well as <ol class="xoxo presentation"> instead of a div for the overall presentation.

== See also ==
- Web-based slideshow
