= David Vignoni =

Italian graphical artist

David Vignoni (born 1980) is an Italian graphic designer specialising in icon and digital product design.

Vignoni was born in Cesena, Italy. He is the creator of the Nuvola icon set, which has been used in many projects, including script.aculo.us and Prototype JavaScript Framework. He has designed icons for several web sites, including openSUSE. He has also designed icon sets for applications such as Flumotion, Samba 2000, and Strata (an insurance application), as well as for various KDE projects, such as Kontact and the KDE Edutainment Project. David is one of the founders of the Oxygen Project, which is the default icon theme on the KDE flagship desktop.

In 2005, Vignoni graduated from the University of Bologna with a B.S. degree in computer science. He has worked as a consultant for SuSE Linux, as an independent graphic designer, and at Meebo. Previously, he worked as lead designer at Hailo. He lives and works in London.
