= Opera Show Format =

- Filename extension: .xhtml, .html
- Internet media type: application/xhtml+xml text/html
- Developed by: Opera Software
- Type of format: Presentation program
- Extended from: XHTML 1.0 Strict
- Extended to: S5 (file format)
- Website: Creating presentations/slideshows with HTML & CSS

The Opera Show Format (OSF) is a set of conventions used in a web page using XHTML 1.0 Strict and CSS 2.1. It is designed to allow presentations to be easily created with web authoring tools. OSF requires that a number of meta tags be present, including version, generator, author, and presdate (the creation or presentation date). The entire presentation, including all slides and images (in data: URIs) is contained in a single file. The look of all slides is controlled by the layout section, contained in a <div class="layout"> HTML element. The slides themselves are contained in a presentation section contained in a <div class="presentation"> element. Each slide is contained in a <div class="slide"> element.

== Tools ==
The Slide Show (S9) Ruby gem creates OSF-compatible presentations using a wiki-style markup language. Other tools include the Windows-based QuickShow, and the Project Velt Opera widget. Opera Software once provided an online OSF generator, which has since gone offline. An older version is available at the personal site of Opera Software's CTO, Håkon Wium Lie.

== See also ==
- S5 (file format) — compatible with the Opera Show Format, designed to be used in additional browsers.
