= NewsNow =

News aggregator service that was launched in 1997

- Website type: News Aggregator
- Owner: NewsNow Publishing Ltd.
- Revenue: Subscription and Advertising
- Website: newsnow.co.uk (UK news) newsnow.com/us/ (US news) newsnow.com/ng/ (NG news) newsnow.com/ro/ (RO news) newsnow.it (IT news)
- Registration: Optional
- Launched: 1997

NewsNow is a news aggregator service that was launched in 1997 with fewer than ten sources. It now links to thousands of publications including top news providers. NewsNow provides a service in which breaking news articles are matched against key-word topic specifications. The relevant links and publication names are then delivered to the user.

Other than NewsNow's main website, which is freely accessible to the general public, the company provides customised news feeds for corporate subscribers. The site also offers access via mobile devices and offers a version tailored for the Opera Mini application.

== Ranking ==
NewsNow.co.uk is the 274th most visited website in the UK, and approximately 14.4% of all its users are from the UK. Moreover, the site is generally visited by over 11 million users monthly.

NewsNow has around 623,000 pages indexed by Google. It has a 20% market share making it the second largest news aggregation site on the Internet second only to Google News. According to data from Hitwise, as of 22 August 2009, NewsNow accounted for almost 20% of visits to news aggregators in the UK.

== Controversy ==
According to an open letter in 2009 placed on its site, NewsNow has been threatened with potential legal action by several publishers, including News International, the publishers of The Times, The Sun and The News of the World. An open letter, written by Struan Bartlett, NewsNow's Managing Director and Chairman, claimed that the publishers were threatening legal action over NewsNow's refusal to accept new controls over links to websites owned by these publishers. He responded to the comments from the News International with the following statement: "We deliver you traffic and drive you revenues you otherwise wouldn't have received. The idea that we are undermining your businesses is incorrect. It is fanciful to imagine that, if it weren't for link aggregators, you would have more traffic or revenues. We provide a service that you do not: a means for readers to find your content more readily, via continuously updating links to a diversity of websites."

There has also been interest from the UK's Newspaper Licensing Agency regarding the use of news headlines search results, which they consider to be copyrighted content.
