= OSF Digital =

Canadian digital services company

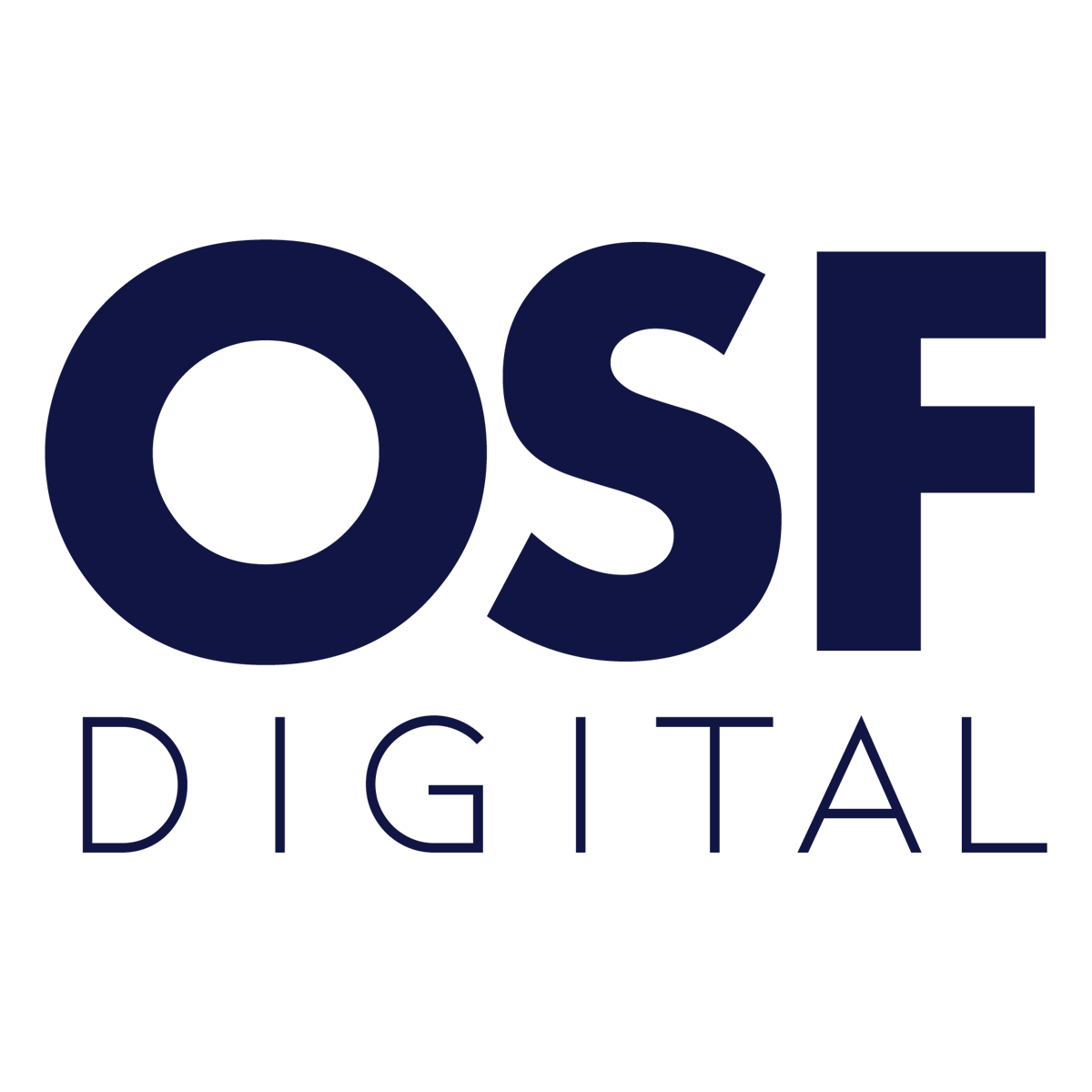
- Type: Private
- Industry: automotive, consumer goods, high tech, telecom, retail, manufacturing, insurance, financial services.
- Founded: 2003
- Founder: Gerard Szatvanyi
- Headquarters: Quebec City, Quebec, Canada
- Area served: North America, LATAM, EMEA, and APAC
- Key people: David Northington (CEO); Giri Premsingh (COO, CFO); Gerard Szatvanyi (Founder, Chief AI Officer)

OSF Digital is a Canadian information technology consulting and digital transformation company headquartered in Quebec City, Quebec.

It provides consulting, implementation, and managed services for the Salesforce platform, serving business clients across North America, Latin America, Europe, and the Asia-Pacific region.

Founded in 2003, OSF Digital expanded internationally through a series of acquisitions of ecommerce and Salesforce consulting firms. The company states that its current focus is helping organizations adopt and govern agentic artificial intelligence within the Salesforce ecosystem.

== History ==
OSF Digital was founded in 2003, with early operations in Quebec City, Canada, and Bucharest, Romania. In 2006 it began offering IT development and consulting services, and in 2007 it became a Microsoft Gold Partner.

In 2009 the company partnered with Demandware, later acquired by Salesforce and renamed Salesforce Commerce Cloud, and in 2010 it entered a partnership with Salesforce. It became a Salesforce Gold Partner in 2018 and a Salesforce Platinum Partner in 2021

In 2019 OSF Digital began a reforestation partnership with Reforest'Action and later established an environmental program called OSF Forest. In 2020 it joined the Pledge 1% corporate philanthropy program.

By 2022 the company reported approximately 2,200 employees and operations across dozens of locations on five continents. In 2025, David Northington was appointed chief executive officer, and founder Gerard Szatvanyi became chief AI officer.

Beginning in 2018, OSF Digital grew through a series of acquisitions, most of them ecommerce or Salesforce consulting firms.

In 2018 it acquired iFactory Solutions (Brazil). In 2019 it acquired Blueleaf (United Kingdom), Soul Ecommerce (Spain), and Successyou (Germany). In 2021 it acquired Adept Group (New Zealand), Relation1 (Canada), Werise (Brazil), and Paladin Group (United States).

In 2022 it acquired netnomics (Germany), Datarati (Australia), FitForCommerce (United States), Kolekto (Brazil), Aarin (United States), and Oegen (United Kingdom). In 2023 it acquired Original Shift (United States).

OSF Digital is backed by investors including Salesforce Ventures, Delta-v Capital, and Sunstone Partners. It first received investment from Salesforce Ventures in 2018. In 2019 it raised a $23 million equity round led by Delta-v Capital with participation from Salesforce Ventures. It raised $43 million in 2021 and $100 million in 2022.

== Awards and honors ==
OSF Digital has received several partner awards from Salesforce, including the Partner Innovation Award in Retail (2016) and the Lightning Bolt Trailblazer Award for Retail (2018). In 2022 it was named Salesforce Japan Partner of the Year for Commerce Cloud and received a Salesforce Commerce Cloud Partner of the Year award. It received further Salesforce Partner Innovation Awards in later years, including in the automotive (2024) and financial services (2025) categories.
