= XBEL =

Markup language

The XML Bookmark Exchange Language (XBEL), is an open XML standard for sharing Internet URIs, also known as bookmarks (or favorites in Internet Explorer).

XBEL was created by the Python XML Special Interest Group "to create an interesting, fun project which was both useful and would demonstrate the Python XML processing software which was being developed at the time".

The cross-platform Floccus client can store and synchronize XBEL via a variety of services like WebDAV, Google Drive, Nextcloud bookmarks, etc. The SiteBar bookmark server can import and export bookmarks in XBEL format.

The Galeon, Konqueror, Arora and Midori web browsers use XBEL as the format for storing user bookmarks. An older example of XBEL use is the XBELicious application, which stores Del.icio.us bookmarks in XBEL format.

It is also used by Nautilus and gedit of the GNOME desktop environment.

== Example ==
<?xml version="1.0" encoding="UTF-8"?>
<!DOCTYPE xbel PUBLIC "+//IDN python.org//DTD XML Bookmark Exchange Language 1.0//EN//XML" "http://pyxml.sourceforge.net/topics/dtds/xbel.dtd">
<xbel version="1.0">
    <folder folded="no">
        <title>Wikimedia resources</title>
        <folder folded="yes">
            <title>Wikimedia websites</title>
            <bookmark href="https://en.wikipedia.org/">
                <title>Wikipedia</title>
            </bookmark>
            <bookmark href="https://en.wikibooks.org/">
                <title>Wikibooks</title>
            </bookmark>
        </folder>
    </folder>
</xbel>

== See also ==
- Internet bookmark
- XOXO (eXtensible Open XHTML Outlines), an XML microformat for outlines built on top of XHTML.
- OPML (Outline Processor Markup Language), an XML format for outlines.
