= Nuvola =

Free icon set released 2004

Nuvola is a free software icon set under the GNU LGPL 2.1 license, created by David Vignoni. Originally created for desktop environments like KDE and GNOME, it is also available in packages for Windows and Mac. The final version, 1.0, contains almost 600 icons. The default set is in the PNG graphics format; an SVG version is also available.

The application icons, in particular, colourfully represent a wide variety of commonplace and easily recognised objects.

== Uses ==
Besides KDE and GNOME, Nuvola is used by the Pidgin instant messaging client, the Amarok media player and the KeePass password manager. Nuvola is the default icon set on the OpenLab Linux distribution. It is also used for many purposes on Wikimedia Foundation projects.

== Examples of icons ==
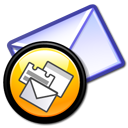

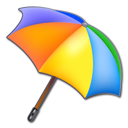

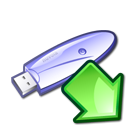

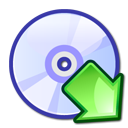

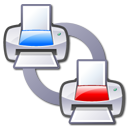

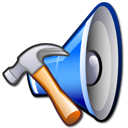

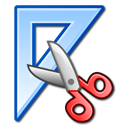

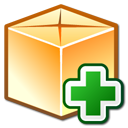

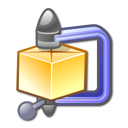

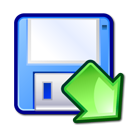

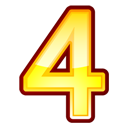

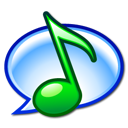

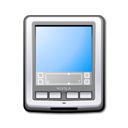

== See also ==
- Bluecurve – former default GPL icon set of Fedora
- Crystal – LGPL icon set by Everaldo Coelho
- Icon (computing)
- Openclipart
- Oxygen Project – LGPL icon set for KDE
- Palette (computing)
- Theme (computing)
