= Attention Profiling Mark-up Language =

Attention Profiling Mark-up Language (APML) is an XML-based markup language for documenting a person's interests and dislikes.

== Overview ==
APML allows people to share their own personal attention profile in much the same way that OPML allows the exchange of reading lists between news readers. The idea behind APML is to compress all forms of attention data into a portable file format containing a description of the user's rated interests.

== The APML Workgroup ==
The APML Workgroup is tasked with maintaining and refining the APML specification. The APML Workgroup is made up of industry experts and leaders and was founded by Chris Saad and Ashley Angell. The workgroup allows public recommendations and input, and actively evangelises the public's "Attention Rights". The workgroup also adheres to the principles of Media 2.0 Best Practices.

== Services ==
Services that have adopted APML

- Bloglines was an RSS reader. It was one of the major RSS readers on the web, with its main competitor being Google Reader. Bloglines announced it would support APML.
- OpenLink Data Spaces is a Distributed Collaborative Web Application Platform, Social Network and Content Management System.

== Specifications ==
- Specifications at apml.org^{[usurped]}

== See also ==
- Digital traces
