= OPML =

XML format for outlines

- Filename extension: .opml
- Internet media type: application/xml, text/xml, text/x-opml
- Uniform Type Identifier (UTI): org.opml.opml
- UTI conformation: public.xml
- Developed by: UserLand
- Type of format: Outliner
- Extended from: XML
- Website: dev.opml.org

OPML (Outline Processor Markup Language) is an XML format for outlines (defined as "a tree, where each node contains a set of named attributes with string values"). Originally developed by UserLand Software as a native file format for the outliner application in its Radio UserLand product, it has since been adopted for other uses, the most common being to exchange lists of web feeds between web feed aggregators.

The OPML specification defines an outline as a hierarchical, ordered list of arbitrary elements. The specification is fairly open which makes it suitable for many types of list data.

Support for importing and exporting RSS feed lists in OPML format is available in Mozilla Thunderbird and in most other RSS reader web sites and applications.

== XML format ==
The XML elements in an OPML document are:

<opml version="1.0">
This is the root element. It must contain the version attribute and one head and one body element.

<head>
Contains metadata. May include any of these optional elements: title, dateCreated, dateModified, ownerName, ownerEmail, expansionState, vertScrollState, windowTop, windowLeft, windowBottom, windowRight. Each element is a simple text element. dateCreated and dateModified contents conform to the date-time format specified in RFC 822. expansionState contains a comma-separated list of line numbers that should be expanded on display. The windowXXX elements define the position and size of the display window. An OPML processor may ignore all the head sub-elements. If the outline is opened inside another outline then the processor must ignore the window elements.

<body>
Contains the content of the outline. Must have at least one outline element.

<outline>
Represents a line in the outline. May contain any number of arbitrary attributes. Common attributes include text and type. The outline element may contain any number of outline sub-elements.

== Criticism ==
1. The RFC 822 date format is considered obsolete, and amongst other things permits the representation of years as two digits. RFC 822 has been superseded by RFC 2822 then RFC 5322. In general, date and time formats should be represented according to RFC 3339.
2. Due to the semantics of the "expansionState" attribute:
  - The expansion state of the children of collapsed nodes cannot be stored
  - When an outline element is expanded, collapsed, added, deleted or moved, the expansion state of all elements below it must be recalculated
3. Due to the arbitrary nature of the "type" attribute, and the acceptance of arbitrary attributes on "outline" elements, interoperability of OPML documents relies almost entirely on the undocumented conventions of content producers.
4. MIME types aren't clear; text/xml usually merely identifies the document as having XML content, while text/x-opml does not specify that the document is XML since it lacks the +xml suffix.

== Validation ==
Dave Winer, the founder and CEO of Userland, made a request for comments on a proposal for validating OPML. He released a beta version OPML validator in November 2005.

The Harvard Digital Library for Earth System Education (DLESE) published an XML Schema Document for validating OPML 2.0 in 2007. There is also a DTD available for OPML 1.0.

== Alternative specifications ==
Alternative specifications have been proposed, notably these include OML, XOXO and XBEL.

- OML – Outline Markup Language
- XOXO – Extensible Open XHTML Outlines
- XBEL – XML Bookmark Exchange Language

== See also ==
- Data portability
- APML – Attention Profiling Mark-up Language
- Feed icon
- Share icon
