= History of podcasting =

Podcasts, previously known as "audioblogs", have roots dating back to the 1980s. With the advent of broadband Internet access and portable digital audio playback devices such as the iPod, podcasting began to catch hold in late 2004. Today there are more than 115,000 English-language podcasts available on the Internet, approximately 4,550,000 podcasts available globally, and dozens of websites available for distribution at little or no cost to the producer or listener.

== Precursors ==
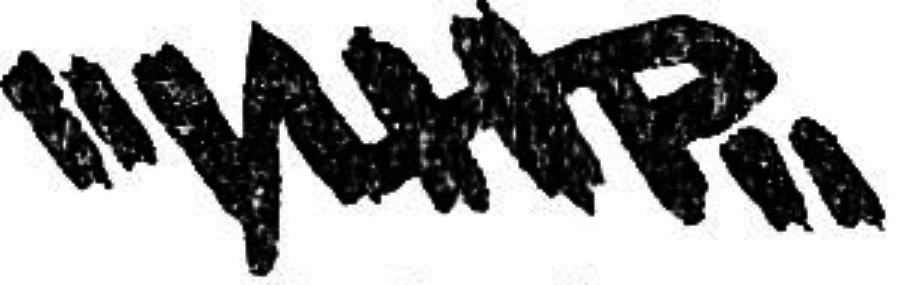
The logo of the project The Illusion of Independent Radio (1989)

The Illusion of Independent Radio is a Russian samizdat "radio program" created in 1989 in Rostov-on-Don and distributed on magnetic tape and cassettes. It was the first Soviet Russian prototype of the media phenomenon that was widely developed in the 2000s as podcasting.

Before the advent of the internet, in the 1980s, RCS (Radio Computing Services), provided music and talk-related software to radio stations in a digital format. Before online music digital distribution, the MIDI format as well as the Mbone, Multicast Network was used to distribute audio and video files. The MBone was a multicast network over the Internet used primarily by educational and research institutes, but there were audio talk programs.

Many other jukeboxes and websites in the mid-1990s provided a system for sorting and selecting music or audio files, talk, segue announcements of different digital formats. There were a few websites that provided audio subscription services. In 1993, the early days of Internet radio, Carl Malamud launched Internet Talk Radio which was the "first computer-radio talk show, each week interviewing a computer expert". It was distributed "as audio files that computer users fetch one by one". A 1993 episode of The Computer Chronicles described the concept as "asynchronous radio". Malamud said listeners could pause and restart the audio files at will, as well as skip content they did not like.

Some websites allowed downloadable audio shows, such as the comedy show The Dan & Scott Show, available on AOL.com from 1996. Additionally, in 1998, Radio Usach, a radio station from the University of Santiago, Chile, explored the option to broadcast online and on demand streaming talk shows. However, the development of downloaded music did not reach a critical mass until the launch of Napster, another system of aggregating music, but without the subscription services provided by podcasting or video blogging aggregation client or system software. Independent of the development of podcasting via RSS, a portable player and music download system had been developed at Compaq Research as early as 1999 or 2000. Called PocketDJ, it would have been launched as a service for the Personal Jukebox or a successor, the first hard-disk based MP3-player.

RantMedia were early pioneers of various internet radio programs dating back to 1999 (What The Hell podcast, incorporating IRC chat and video before YouTube chat was created) and 2005 (Newsreal with Sean Kennedy podcast).

In 2001, Applian Technologies of San Francisco introduced Replay Radio (later renamed into Replay AV), a TiVo-like recorder for Internet Radio Shows. Besides scheduling and recording audio, one of the features was a Direct Download link, which would scan a radio publisher's site for new files and copy them directly to a PC's hard disk. The first radio show to publish in this format was WebTalkGuys World Radio Show, produced by Rob and Dana Greenlee.

== Timeline ==
In September 2000, the first system that enabled the selection, automatic downloading and storage of serial episodic audio content on PCs and portable devices was launched from early MP3 player manufacturer, i2Go. To supply content for its portable MP3 players, i2Go introduced a digital audio news and entertainment service called MyAudio2Go.com that enabled users to download episodic news, sports, entertainment, weather, and music in audio format for listening on a PC, the eGo portable audio player, or other MP3 players. The i2GoMediaManager and the eGo file transfer application could be programmed to automatically download the latest episodic content available from user selected content types to a PC or portable device as desired. The service lasted over a year, but succumbed when the i2Go company ran out of capital during the dot-com crash and folded.

=== The RSS connection ===
In October 2000, the concept of attaching sound and video files in RSS feeds was proposed in a draft by Tristan Louis. The idea was implemented by Dave Winer, a software developer and an author of the RSS format. Winer had received other customer requests for "audioblogging" features and had discussed the enclosure concept (also in October 2000) with Adam Curry, a user of Userland's Manila and Radio blogging and RSS aggregator software.

Winer included the new functionality in RSS 0.92 by defining a new element called "enclosure", which would simply pass the address to a media aggregator. On January 11, 2001, Winer demonstrated the RSS enclosure feature by enclosing a Grateful Dead song in his Scripting News weblog.

For its first two years, the enclosure element had relatively few users and many developers simply avoided using it. Winer's company incorporated both RSS-enclosure and feed-aggregator features in its weblogging product, Radio Userland, the program favored by Curry, audioblogger Harold Gilchrist and others. Since Radio Userland had a built-in aggregator, it provided both the "send" and "receive" components of what was then called "audioblogging". All that was needed for "podcasting" was a way to automatically move audio files from Radio Userland's download folder to an audio player (either software or hardware)—along with enough compelling audio to make such automation worth the trouble.

In June 2003, Stephen Downes demonstrated aggregation and syndication of audio files in his Ed Radio application. Ed Radio scanned RSS feeds for MP3 files, collected them into a single feed, and made the result available as SMIL or Webjay audio feeds.

=== The first on-demand radio show and the first podcast ===
In August 2000, the New England Patriots launched the Internet radio show PFW in Progress. It was a live show that was recorded and made available for on-demand download to visitors of Patriots.com, although this wasn't technically a podcast at the time, since the technology had not yet been invented to automatically download new episodes—a key differentiator that sets podcasts apart from simple audio files that can be downloaded manually. In 2005, two years after the introduction of the iTunes platform, the show was also offered there as a bona fide podcast. Today, it is still in existence, under the name Patriots Unfiltered, and is available on all podcast platforms.

In September 2003, the aforementioned Dave Winer created a special RSS-with-enclosures feed for his Harvard Berkman Center colleague Christopher Lydon's weblog, which previously had a text-only RSS feed. Lydon, a former New York Times reporter, Boston TV news anchor and NPR talkshow host, had developed a portable recording studio, conducted in-depth interviews with bloggers, futurists and political figures, and posted MP3 files as part of his Harvard blog. When Lydon had accumulated about 25 audio interviews, Winer gradually released them as a new RSS feed. Announcing the feed in his weblog, Winer challenged other aggregator developers to support this new form of content and provide enclosure support.

Not long after, Pete Prodoehl released a skin for the Amphetadesk aggregator that displayed enclosure links. Doug Kaye, who had been publishing MP3 recordings of his interviews at IT Conversations since June, created an RSS feed with enclosures, thus creating the first true podcast. Lydon's blog eventually became Radio Open Source; its accompanying podcast, titled Open Source (not to be confused with Adam Curry's Daily Source Code, which was also one of the first podcasts), is now the oldest still-running podcast.

=== BloggerCon ===
October 2003, Winer and friends organized the first BloggerCon weblogger conference at Berkman Center. CDs of Lydon's interviews were distributed as an example of the high-quality MP3 content enclosures could deliver; Bob Doyle demonstrated the portable studio he helped Lydon develop; Harold Gilchrist presented a history of audioblogging, including Curry's early role, and Kevin Marks demonstrated a script to download RSS enclosures and pass them to iTunes for transfer to an iPod. Curry and Marks discussed collaborating.

=== Pushing audio to a device ===
After the conference, Curry offered his blog readers an RSS-to-iPod script that moved MP3 files from Userland Radio to iTunes, and encouraged other developers to build on the idea.

In November 2003, the company AudioFeast (later renamed PodBridge, then VoloMedia) filed a patent application for "Method for Providing Episodic Media" with the USPTO based on its work in developing the AudioFeast service launched in September 2004. Although AudioFeast did not refer to itself as a podcasting service and was not built on RSS, it provided a way of downloading episodic audio content through desktop software and portable devices, with a system similar to the MyAudio2Go.com service four years before it. (AudioFeast shut down its service in July 2005 due to the unwillingness of its free customers to pay for its $49.95 paid annual subscription service, and a lack of a strong competitive differentiation in the market with the emergence of free RSS podcatchers.)

In May 2004, Eric Rice, then of SlackStreet.com, along with Randy Dryburgh of VocalSpace.com launched Audioblog.com as the first commercial podcasting hosting service. Audioblog.com became Hipcast.com in June 2006 and has hosted hundreds of thousands of podcasts since.

In September 2004, the media-in-newsfeed idea was picked up by multiple developer groups. While many of the early efforts remained command-line based, the very first podcasting client with a graphic user interface was iPodderX (later called Transistr after a trademark dispute with Apple), developed by August Trometer and Ray Slakinski. It was released first for the Mac, then for the PC. Shortly thereafter, another group (iSpider) rebranded their software as iPodder and released it under that name as Free Software (under GPL). The project was terminated after a cease and desist letter from Apple (over iPodder trademark issues). It was reincarnated as Juice and CastPodder.

=== The name ===
Writing for The Guardian in February 2004, journalist Ben Hammersley suggested the term "podcasting" as a name for the nascent technology. Seven months later, Dannie Gregoire used the term "podcasting" to describe the automatic download and synchronization of audio content; he also registered several "podcast"-related domains (e.g. podcast.net). The first documented use of "podcasting" in the definition known today (i.e., broadcasting rather than downloading) was mentioned in a podcast episode of the Evil Genius Chronicles on September 18, 2004, by Dave Slusher, who also mentioned the emerging technology of torrenting as well as pondering if he should monetise the podcast (and, if so, whether it should be through sponsorship or through voluntary donations, which is a dilemma that many professional podcasters face today). As of March 2021, the recording is still available to be streamed or downloaded.

The use of "podcast" by Gregoire was picked up by podcasting evangelists such as Slusher, Winer and Curry, and entered common usage. Also in September, Adam Curry launched a mailing list; then Slashdot had a 100+ message discussion, bringing even more attention to the podcasting developer projects in progress.

On September 28, 2004, Blogger and technology columnist Doc Searls began keeping track of how many "hits" Google found for the word "podcasts". His first query reportedly returned 24 results. Google Trends marks the beginning of searches for "podcast" at the end of September. On October 1, 2004, there were 2,750 hits on Google's search engine for the word "podcasts". This number continued to double every few days.

By October 11, 2004, capturing the early distribution and variety of podcasts was more difficult than counting Google hits. However, by the end of October, The New York Times had reported on podcasts across the United States and in Canada, Australia and Sweden, mentioning podcast topics from technology to veganism to movie reviews.

=== Wider notice ===
USA Today told its readers about the "free amateur chatfests" the following February, profiling several podcasters, giving instructions for sending and receiving podcasts, and including a "Top Ten" list from one of the many podcast directories that had sprung up. Those Top Ten programs gave further indication of podcast topics: four were about technology (including Curry's Daily Source Code, which also included music and personal chat), three were about music, one about movies, one about politics, and—at the time number one on the list—The Dawn and Drew Show, described as "married-couple banter", a program format that (as USA Today noted) was popular on American broadcast radio in the 1940s (e.g. Breakfast with Dorothy and Dick). After Dawn and Drew, such "couplecasts" became quite popular among independent podcasts, the most notable being the London couple Sowerby and Luff (consisting of comedy writers Brian West (Luff) and Georgina Sowerby), whose talk show The Big Squeeze quickly achieved a global audience via the podcast Comedy 365. On October 18, 2004, the number of hits on Google's search engine for the word "podcasts" ballooned to more than 100,000 after being just 24 results three weeks prior.

In October 2004, detailed how-to-podcast articles had begun to appear online, and a month later, Liberated Syndication, Inc. known in the industry as Libsyn launched the first Podcast Service Provider, offering storage, bandwidth, and RSS creation tools. This was the same month that Podtrac started providing its free download tracking service and audience demographics survey to the podcasting industry. "Podcasting" was first defined in Wikipedia. In November 2004, podcasting networks started to appear on the scene with podcasters affiliating with one another. One of the earliest adopters from the mainstream media of on-demand audio (although not strictly a podcast) was the BBC, with the BBC World Service show, Go Digital, in August 2001. The first domestic BBC show to be podcasted was In Our Time, made available as a podcast in November 2004.

=== Apple adds podcasts to iTunes ===
In June 2005, Apple added podcasting to its iTunes 4.9 music software and building a directory of podcasts at its iTunes Music Store. The new iTunes could subscribe to, download and organize podcasts, which made a separate aggregator application unnecessary for many users. Apple also promoted creation of podcasts using its GarageBand and QuickTime Pro software and the MP4 format instead of MP3. Prior to iTunes' seamless integration, acquiring and organising podcasts required dedicated "podcatching" software that was often clunky and intimidating for the average user.

In July 2005, U.S. President George W. Bush became a podcaster of sorts, when the White House website added an RSS 2.0 feed to the previously downloadable files of the president's weekly radio addresses. Also in July, the first People's Choice Podcast Awards were held during the Podcast Expo. Awards were given in 20 categories. On September 28, 2005, exactly a year after first tracking hits for the word "podcasts" on Google's search engine, Google found more than 100 million hits on the word "podcasts". In November 2005, the first Portable Media Expo and Podcasting Conference was held at the Ontario Convention Center in Ontario, California.

At that conference, the podcast Eat Feed won the first podcast of the year award. Hosted by Anne Bramley, the pen-name of a PhD student in English from the University of Chicago, Eat Feed took a wide angle view of food from all over the world. Bramley interviewed famous and influential chefs, scholars, food writers, and cookbook authors. As a cook, a writer, and a researcher herself, Bramley also served up her own ideas and personal experiences in each episode. At that time, editing and scripting a podcast was an innovation. The usual fare was unscripted, unedited, and almost purposefully desultory. But by bringing an academic mind and an ear for performance, Bramley helped professionalize the medium.

The annual conference changed its name to the Podcast and New Media Expo, which stopped being held in 2015. On December 3, 2005, "podcast" was named the word of the year in 2005 by the New Oxford American Dictionary and would be in the dictionary in 2006.

=== Expansion ===
In May 2005 Swedish Radio first published podcast for the listeners to download. The first podcasts offered were Ekots lördagsintervju i P1, Spanarna i P1 and Salva i P3 but shortly after the offer was expanded to include several other titles. PRI-Public Radio International was one of the first radio podcasters in the United States, when its program The World launched its popular technology podcast on February 11, 2005, hosted by Clark Boyd.

In February 2006, following London radio station LBC's successful launch of the first premium-podcasting platform, LBC Plus, there was widespread acceptance that podcasting had considerable commercial potential. UK comedian Ricky Gervais, whose first season of The Ricky Gervais Show became a big hit, launched a new series of the popular podcast. The second series of the podcast was distributed through audible.co.uk and was the first major podcast to charge consumers to download the show (at a rate of 95 pence per half-hour episode). The first series of The Ricky Gervais Show podcast had been freely distributed by the Positive Internet Company and marketed through The Guardian newspaper's website, and it was the world's most successful podcast for several years, eventually gaining more than 300 million unique downloads by March 2011. Even in its new subscription format, The Ricky Gervais Show was regularly the most-downloaded podcast on iTunes. The Adam Carolla Show claimed a new Guinness world record, with total downloads approaching 60 million, but Guinness failed to acknowledge that Gervais's podcast had more than 5 times as many downloads as Carolla's show at the time that this new record was supposedly set.

In February 2006, LA podcaster Lance Anderson became nearly the first to take a podcast and create a live venue tour. The Lance Anderson Podcast Experment (sic) included a sold-out extravaganza in The Pilgrim, a central Liverpool (UK) venue (February 23, 2006), followed by a theatrical event at The Rose Theatre, Edge Hill University (February 24, 2006), which included appearances by Mark Hunter from The Tartan Podcast, Jon and Rob from Top of the Pods, Dan Klass from The Bitterest Pill via video link from Los Angeles, and live music from The Hotrod Cadets. In addition, Anderson was also invited to take part in the first-ever Podcast Forum at CARET, the Centre for Applied Research in Educational Technologies at the University of Cambridge (February 21, 2006). Organised and supported by Josh Newman, the university's Apple Campus Rep, Anderson was joined at this event by Dr. Chris Smith from the Naked Scientists podcast; Debbie McGowan, an Open University lecturer and advocate for podcasting in education; and Nigel Paice, a professional music producer and podcasting tutor. In March 2006, Canadian Prime Minister Stephen Harper became the second head of government to issue a podcast, the Prime Minister of Canada's Podcast (George W. Bush technically being the first one back in July 2005). In July 2009, the company VoloMedia is awarded the "Podcast patent" by the USPTO in patent number 7,568,213. Dave Winer, the co-inventor of podcasting (with Adam Curry), points out that his invention predated this patent by two years.

On February 2, 2006, Virginia Tech (Virginia Polytechnic Institute and State University) launched the first regular schedule of podcast programming at the university. Having four regularly scheduled podcasts was a first for a major American university, which was launched as part of Virginia Tech's "Invent the Future" campaign.

In April 2006, comedy podcast Never Not Funny began when Matt Belknap of Aspecialthing Records interviewed comedian Jimmy Pardo on the podcast for his popular alternative comedy forum A Special Thing. The two had previously discussed producing a podcast version of Jimmy's Los Angeles show "Running Your Trap", which he hosted at the Upright Citizens Brigade Theatre, but they hit it off so well on AST Radio that Pardo said "This is the show." Shortly after, Never Not Funny started simulcasting both a podcast stream and a paid video version. The podcast still uses this format, releasing two shows a week—one free and one paid—along with paid video feed.

In October 2006, the This American Life radio program began to offer a podcast version to listeners. Since debuting, This American Life has consistently been one of the most-listened-to podcasts, averaging around 2.5 million downloads per episode.

In March 2007, after being on-air talent and being fired from KYSR (STAR) in Los Angeles, California, Jack and Stench started their own subscription-based podcast. At $5.00 per subscription, subscribers had access to a one-hour podcast, free of any commercials. They had free local events at bars, ice cream parlors and restaurants all around Southern California. With a successful run of 12 years and over 2,700 episodes, the Jack and Stench Show is among the longest-running monetized podcasts.

In March 2007, the Cambridge CARET Centre also helped to give birth to the first as-live podcast channel for women politicians in the UK and globally called Women's Parliamentary Radio. A former BBC correspondent and political editor in the East, Boni Sones OBE, worked with three other broadcast journalists—Jackie Ashley, Deborah McGurran, and Linda Fairbrother—to create an online radio station where women MPs of all parties could be interviewed impartially. The MP3 files could be streamed or downloaded. Their resulting 550 interviews over 15 years can now be found in one of four audio archives nationally at the British Library, the London School of Economics, The History of Parliament Trust and the Churchill Archives University of Cambridge. Sones has also written four books about these podcast interviews and archives, which are in all the major libraries in the UK.

In 2007, the original co-hosts of the radio show The Sound of Young America, Jesse Thorn and Jordan Morris started The Untitled Thorn/Morris Project, missing working together after their graduation from UC Santa Cruz. The show was renamed Jordan, Jesse, Go!, and is still running to this day.

On March 2, 2008, Canadian friends and comedians Dave Shumka and Graham Clark launched Stop Podcasting Yourself. Their fans were nicknamed "bumpers" after Shumka mistakenly called them that in episode 1. In 2011, SPY joined Jesse Thorn's Maximum Fun network.

In September 2008, NPR and This American Life launched "Planet Money," the first time a public radio program was launched as a podcast, not a broadcast radio show.

The Adam Carolla Show started as a regular weekday podcast in March 2009; by March 2011, 59.6 million episodes had been downloaded in total, claiming a record; however, as previously mentioned, Gervais's podcast had already received five times Carolla's downloads by the time the record was supposedly set. The BBC noted in 2011 that more people (eight million in the UK or about 16% of the population, with half listening at least once a week—a similar proportion to the USA) had downloaded podcasts than had used Twitter.

Besides the aforementioned Adam Carolla Show, 2009 saw a huge influx of many other popular new comedy podcasts, including the massively successful talk-style podcasts with a comedic bent such as WTF with Marc Maron, The Joe Rogan Experience, How Do Podcast, and the David Feldman Show. 2009 also saw the launch of the surrealist comedy show Comedy Bang! Bang! (which was known as Comedy Death-Ray Radio at the time), which was later turned into a TV show with the same name.

With a run of eight years (as of October 2013), the various podcasts provided by Wrestling Observer/Figure Four Online, including Figure Four Daily and the Bryan and Vinny Show with host Bryan Alvarez, and Wrestling Observer Radio with hosts Alvarez and Dave Meltzer, have produced over 6,000 monetized podcasts at a subscription rate of $10.99 per month. Their subscription podcast model launched in June 2005. Alvarez and Meltzer were co-hosts in the late 1990s at Eyada.com, the first Internet-exclusive live streaming radio station, broadcasting out of New York City.

In 2014, This American Life launched the first season of their Serial podcast. The podcast was a surprise success, achieving 68 million downloads by the end of Season 1 and becoming the first podcast to win a Peabody Award. The program was referred to as a "phenomenon" by media outlets and popularized true crime podcasts. True crime programs such as My Favorite Murder, Crimetown, and Casefile were produced after the release of Serial and each of these titles became successful in their own right. From 2012 to 2013, surveys showed that the number of podcast listeners had dropped for the first time since 2008. However, after Serial debuted, audience numbers rose by 3%.

Podcasting reached a new stage of growth in 2017 when The New York Times debuted The Daily news podcast. The Daily is designed to match the fast pace of modern news, and the show features original reporting and recordings of the newspaper's top stories. As of May 2019, it has the highest unique monthly US audience of any podcast.

In February 2019, Spotify announced that it was buying two podcast companies: the podcast studio Gimlet Media and Anchor, which offered tools for podcast creators. CEO Daniel Ek described the move as expanding Spotify "from just being about music to being about all of audio." In May 2020, Spotify signed The Joe Rogan Experience to an exclusive multi-year licensing deal. The show came to Spotify on September 1, 2020, and became exclusive to the platform later that year.

== Download records ==
Due to the fragmented delivery mechanisms and various other factors, it is difficult to externally nail down a precise listenership figure for any one podcast (although podcasters themselves can generally get fairly accurate data if they so please, which is especially useful for securing advertising contracts). As of December 2018, Serial was believed by some sources to be the most downloaded podcast of all time, with 420 million total downloads, surpassing Gervais's 300 million figure from back in 2011. However, Stuff You Should Know has accrued more than a billion downloads, and there are others still that have also hit this figure. According to Podtrac, NPR is the most popular podcast publisher, with over 175 million downloads and streams every month; however, Joe Rogan claimed in 2019 that his podcast alone was receiving 190 million downloads a month—a claim that is very likely true—and therefore makes his show the most downloaded podcast of all time in terms of both average viewership and total downloads. Indeed, Rogan signed a $100 million licensing deal with Spotify due to his unprecedented success with the medium.

Nielsen and Edison Research reported in April 2019 that they had logged 700,000 active podcasts worldwide. Their research also revealed that, per capita, South Korea leads the world in podcast listeners, with 58% of South Koreans listening to podcasts every month. For comparison, in 2019, 32% of Americans had listened to podcasts in the last month. In 2020, 24% of Americans had listened to podcasts weekly. Comedy is the most popular podcast genre in the United States. There are more than 1,700,000 shows and nearly 44 million episodes as of January 19, 2021. Podtrac reports iHeartRadio's shows had more than 243 million downloads. IAB and PWC project that U.S. podcast advertising revenues will surpass $1 billion by 2021.

== Video podcasting ==
A video podcast or vodcast is a podcast that contains video content. Web television series are often distributed as video podcasts. Dead End Days, a serialized dark comedy about zombies released from October 31, 2003, through 2004, is commonly believed to be the first video podcast. Diggnation was one of the most successful early video podcasts, running for 7 years before going on hiatus. Never Not Funny was a pioneer in providing video content in the form of a podcast.

Many traditional audio podcasts also record video, so that highlights or entire episodes can be posted to social media and video sharing platforms, predominantly YouTube. This practice became more popular in 2024, after the closure of Google Podcasts. YouTube also added the ability to automatically ingest podcast feeds as early as May 2023, which are then available on both YouTube (with a static image of the podcast’s episode art) and YouTube Music. YouTube has become an increasingly popular platform for podcasts. In 2025, Edison’s Infinite Dial report revealed 33% of American podcast listeners used YouTube, a larger share than Spotify or Apple Podcasts. In February 2025, YouTube announced that it had surpassed 1 billion monthly active podcast viewers.

== Popularization ==
=== Business model studies ===
Classes of MBA students have been commissioned to research podcasting and compare possible business models, and venture capital flowing to influential content providers.

=== Podnography ===
As is often the case with new technologies, pornography has become a part of the scene, producing what is sometimes called podnography.

=== Podsafe music ===
The growing popularity of podcasting introduced a demand for music available for use on the shows without significant cost or licensing difficulty. Out of this demand, a growing number of tracks, by independent as well as signed acts, are now being designated "podsafe".

=== Use by conventional media ===
Podcasting has been given a major push by conventional media.

Broadcast media

Podcasting has influenced mainstream radio outlets in a variety of ways. Some broadcasters have adopted podcasts as a distribution channel for existing programs, while others have faced difficulties in evaluating podcast performance using traditional audience metrics. An example frequently cited in discussions of online media measurement involved marketing staff at the Australian Broadcasting Corporation, who observed that Digital Living, a relatively low-profile podcast at the time, appeared to receive more downloads than several higher-budget productions. Subsequent analysis indicated that the results were affected by a single episode segment being downloaded a large number of times from one overseas location, highlighting challenges in interpreting raw download statistics.

Print media

For example, podcasting has been picked up by some print media outlets, which supply their readers with spoken versions of their content. One of the first examples of a print publication to produce an audio podcast to supplement its printed content was the international scientific journal Nature. The Nature Podcast was set up in October 2005 by Cambridge University's award-winning "Naked Scientist", Chris Smith, who produces and presents the weekly show.

Although firm business models have yet to be established, podcasting represents a chance to bring additional revenue to a newspaper through advertising, subscription fees and licensing.

=== Podcamps ===
Chris Brogan and Christopher S. Penn launched the PodCamp unconference series aimed at bringing together people interested in blogging, social media, social networking, podcasting, and video on the net, and in so doing, Brogan won the Mass High Tech All Stars award for 2008.

=== Podcast Movement ===
Podcaster Gary Leland joined forces with Dan Franks and Jared Easley to form a new international conference for podcasters in early 2014 called Podcast Movement. Unlike other new media events, Podcast Movement was the first conference of its size in over a decade that was focused specifically on podcasting, and has tracks for both new and experienced podcast creators, as well as industry professionals. The sixth annual conference is expected to be attended by over 3,000 podcasters, and is scheduled for August 2019 in Orlando, FL.

=== Adaptions ===
Some popular podcasts, such as Lore, Homecoming, and My Brother, My Brother, and Me have been adapted as films or television series.

== Coping with growth ==
While podcasting's innovators took advantage of the sound-file synchronization feature of Apple Inc.'s iPod and iTunes software—and included "pod" in the name—the technology was always compatible with other players and programs. Apple was not actively involved until mid-2005, when it joined the market on three fronts: as a source of "podcatcher" software, as publisher of a podcast directory, and as provider of tutorials on how to create podcasts with Apple products GarageBand and QuickTime Pro. Apple CEO Steve Jobs demonstrated creating a podcast during his January 10, 2006, keynote address to the Macworld Conference & Expo using new "podcast studio" features in GarageBand 3.

When it added a podcast-subscription feature to its June 28, 2005, release of iTunes 4.9, Apple also launched a directory of podcasts at the iTunes Music Store, starting with 3,000 entries. Apple's software enabled AAC-encoded podcasts to use chapters, bookmarks, external links, and synchronized images displayed on iPod screens or in the iTunes artwork viewer. Two days after release of the program, Apple reported one million podcast subscriptions.

Some podcasters found that exposure to iTunes' huge number of downloaders threatened to make great demands on their bandwidth and related expenses. Possible solutions were proposed, including the addition of a content delivery system, such as Liberated Syndication, aka Libsyn; Podcast Servers; Akamai; a peer-to-peer solution, BitTorrent; or use of free hosting services, such as those offered by the Internet Archive or Spotify.

Since September 2005, a number of services began featuring video-based podcasting, including Apple (via its iTunes Music Store), and the Participatory Culture Foundation. These services handle both audio and video feeds.

== See also ==
- List of podcast clients
- Uses of podcasting
- History of the Internet
- History of iTunes
- History of radio
- History of YouTube
