= Uses of podcasting =

Podcast benefits

Podcasting refers to the distribution of files through web syndication, canonically using RSS feeds with an <enclosure> element. Podcasts, which can include audio, video, PDF, and EPUB files, are subscribed to and downloaded via syndication feeds that provide direct links to media files, and may also be streamed online to a computer or mobile device. Subscribers are then able to listen or watch, as well as transfer the episodes to a variety of media players. Though podcast streaming is similar to radio, there is no overall regulatory body or unified oversight for podcasts. Instead, podcasts give creators more direct access to their listeners. As the technology gained popularity from the mid-2000s, the uses of podcasting grew from simply delivering content to more creative and varied purposes.

Podcast consumption has continued to grow. In 2017, 60% of Americans 12+ were familiar with the term "podcasting", 40% said they had ever listened to a podcast, and 24% said they had listened to one in the past month (up from 21% in 2016). By January 2026, 80% of Americans 12+ had ever listened to or watched a podcast, 58% had consumed one in the past month, and 45% in the past week.

== Education ==
=== Podcasting in K-12 education ===
K-12 schools have also begun adopting podcasting as an instructional tool. Podcasts are used for many educational purposes and there are several advocates of podcasting who believe that it can offer unique educational benefits to learners. The main advantage of podcasting is the simplicity that it offers to learners. Listeners are no longer constrained by time and space with regard to their learning. Podcasts are also said to give superior support to "auditory learners," a contested category sometimes estimated to comprise 30% of all learners. Expensive equipment or sophisticated know-how is not needed to create a podcast. There are free programs that are easily accessible to all people to create podcasts. Podcasting affords iPods and other mobile audio players a double life: a usefulness for both entertainment and education. Podcasts are created by students for projects or by instructors for instructional purposes.

=== Podcasts for students ===
There are many uses for podcasting in the classroom. They can be used to convey instructional information from the teacher or trainer, motivational stories, and auditory case studies. Podcasts can also be used by the learners as artifacts and evidence of learning; for example, a student might prepare a brief podcast as a summary of a concept instead of writing an essay. Podcasts can also be used as a means of self-reflection on the learning processes or products. Podcasts can help keep students on the same page, including those that are absent. Absent students can use podcasts to see class lectures, daily activities, homework assignments, handouts, and more. A review of literature that reports the use of audio podcasts in K-12 and higher education found that individuals use existing podcasts or create their own podcasts.

According to Jonathan Copley, many students choose to use podcasts as a supplement to lecture materials. Before classes, students use podcasts to gain an overall understanding of the upcoming lecture, which makes them feel more confident and much more prepared for the class. The use of podcasts better prepares students for classes and promotes discussions. The download of podcasts peaks both immediately after a podcast has been uploaded and right before examinations or deadlines. Students use podcasts as part of their review for exams because it provides different methods of reinforcement of course material. This includes visual reinforcement of material, testing of their knowledge base, and adding variety to the review experience. In addition, students who missed the lecture because of sickness or other reasons can use podcasts to catch up on their notes. Students learn better when they have a teacher present the materials, rather than going over other people's notes. Finally, students with disabilities and students who do not speak English as their first language use podcasts because they can listen to the material repeatedly.

According to Robin H. Kay, there are four or five key benefits regarding the use of video podcasts for students.

1. Student control over the pace of their own studies
2. Increased motivation
3. Improved study habits
4. Positive impact on testing skills
5. Mixed evidence on class attendance

=== Podcasts for teachers ===
Podcasting can be a tool for teachers or administrators to communicate with parents and the wider community about curriculum plans and content, student assignments and other information.

=== Consuming podcasts ===
Apple introduced iTunes U, a nationwide expansion of a service that puts course lectures and other educational materials online and on-the-go via Apple's iTunes software. In 2006 there were over 400 podcasts from K-12 classes listed on iTunes and over 900 education-related podcasts listed on Yahoo. Students reported that replaying podcasts facilitated the comprehension of complex concepts and increased understanding for non-native language learners.

=== Creating podcasts ===
The use of social technologies allows students to shift from simply consuming media to creating it on their own. Pundits argue that student-produced podcasting can promote several powerful ideas that students can use over a lifetime. These include a hands-on and reflective approach to copyright and fair use in creating digital media. That is, they can create original content as they ethically and effectively collect and remix the work of others. Thus, it is argued, podcasting becomes a tool for students to think about the balance between individual rights and community benefits. In addition, some argue that podcasts help students learn 21st century literacy skills. Students, for example, can use digital audio recording and editing software to create audio dramas, news shows or audio tours. Within Social Studies contexts, for example, podcasting offers a means for encouraging students to question their world, to explore their intuitions about relationships between history, people and to think about things in relation to larger contexts, rather than simply focus on dates and facts. Educators who use podcasting with students argue that it offers learners and teachers flexibility and learner control, opportunities for learner motivation, clarity of instruction, novelty of engagement, widening of 'locations' in which learning is situated – an expansion of the temporal and spatial, engagement with and collaboration around dialogue, and opportunities for learners to get involved in construction of learning for others.

=== Podcasts in higher education ===
The use of podcasts for the purpose of education, whether by professional educators or amateurs, has grown to the point that an annual conference for educational podcasters called Sound Education took place (although it was canceled during the COVID-19 pandemic).

Mobile Learning: Podcasting can be categorized as an m-learning strategy for teaching and learning. In 2004, Musselburgh Grammar School pioneered podcast lessons with foreign language audio revision and homework. In the second half of 2005, a Communication Studies course at the University of Western Australia used student-created podcasts as the main assessment item. In 2005, "Students in the Write" was created for second-grade students at Morse Elementary School in Tarrytown, NY. On 21 February 2006, Lance Anderson, Dr. Chris Smith, Nigel Paice, and Debbie McGowan took part in the first podcast forum at Cambridge University. The event was hosted by the Centre for Applied Research in Educational Technologies.

Mobile Knowledge Transfer: Podcasting is also used by corporations to disseminate information faster and more easily. It can be seen as a further development of Rapid E-Learning as the content can be created fast and without much effort. Learners can learn in idle times which saves time and money for them and the organizations. Audio podcasts can be used during other activities like driving a car, travelling by train, or riding a bus. A group often targeted is the sales-force, as they are highly mobile. There podcasting can be used for sales enablement.

Mathematical Learning: Audio-podcasts can also be used in mathematics education. With the recording of mathematical audio-podcasts, oral communication and representation are focused on. Audio-podcasts have been used in primary school as well as in teacher education. The process of producing the mentioned audio-podcasts in mathematics education facilitates reflection processes.

Scientific Learning: Podcasting is an emerging tool with a broad flexibility to deliver science-based information asynchronously in the online classroom or in online outreach programming.

Journalism Education: School podcasts can be created to expose students to journalism and new-media concepts. Regularly released "news" podcasts can be released by a school group.

Academic Journal Digests: The Society of Critical Care Medicine has a podcast used to update clinicians with summaries of important articles, as well as interviews.

Supply Chain Management Education: In October 2007, Stephan Brady presented his paper on "Podcasting in Supply Chain Education" at the CSCMP Educators Conference, which outlined how podcasting could be used in and outside of the classroom for enhancing supply chain courses through blended, or hybrid learning.

Anxiety: Podcasts have been used to solve problems with college students' anxiety by allowing professors' lectures to be accessed after class so the students would not have to worry about missing any of the material if absent or tardy. According to Anthony Chan & Mark J.W. Lee, "The advent of consumer-level digital multimedia hardware and software have prompted the more technologically inclined instructors and educational designers to construct CD-ROM based resources to engage and excite students using the richness and flexibility of text, graphics, sound, video, animation and interactive content, as well as the combination of these elements".

== Marketing ==
Podcasting can be part of a long-form content marketing strategy, complementing or amplifying other online marketing strategies such as websites, e-books, blogs, and webinars. Podcasts may attract people who are deeply invested in, or even fanatical about, podcasters and their content. Proponents of content marketing argue that the more time that a customer or prospect listens to a podcaster, the more the podcaster can be positioned as a thought leader for a niche market.

Podcasting has been reaching larger shares of people who prefer to listen for information and entertainment. In the fourth quarter of 2025, for US listeners 13 years and older, the share of spoken-word listening on podcasts (40%) surpassed the share on AM/FM radio (39%) for the first time.

Podcasts in the US are generally not subject to Federal Communications Commission (FCC) regulation of over-the-air radio broadcasts, and lower costs for podcast distribution can offer additional opportunities for various types of guerrilla marketing. Nonetheless, podcast creators do face legal constraints such as intellectual property law, especially regarding music copyright.

Podcasts are accessible via a variety of podcast clients, and uploading to any podcast hosting service (e.g., Spotify for Creators, Apple Podcasts, SoundCloud, Buzzsprout, Podbean, Libsyn, Transistor.fm) and setting up a single RSS feed is generally sufficient to reach most podcast directories and listening apps. YouTube, despite being a video-first streaming platform, became the most-used platform for US podcast consumption by 2024–25.

== Physical and mental health ==
The typically informal, conversational style of podcasts encourages parasocial (unreciprocated) feelings of connection. Stories of lived experience can foster a sense of community and greater resilience.

Medical researchers began exploring podcasts early in their history as a possible clinical intervention to improve patient education and treatment outcomes. In 2009, a weight-loss randomized controlled trial of 79 adults with minimal face-to-face intervention compared patients listening to an ordinary two-host podcast (control group) with patients listening to an enhanced podcast (which sought to reduce cognitive load while increasing individual elaboration of information, in part by including a scripted "soap opera" story for greater engagement). The 12-week trial found only minimal weight loss (0.3 kg) for the ordinary podcast group, but significant loss (2.9 kg) for the enhanced podcast group.

Podcasts as an informal source of health support during the COVID-19 pandemic attracted wider attention. By contrast, a 2024 scoping review of 38 studies of podcast interventions to promote health-related behaviors over the two decades since 2004 noted, "it is somewhat surprising how little attention podcasts have received in the scientific literature, compared with other digital approaches, such as smartphone apps, which have been around for a similar length of time, yet received vastly more research attention."

A 2025 meta-analysis of 20 podcast-based mental health interventions (40% with mindfulness and meditation exercises, 40% with psychosocial and therapeutic education) showed some promise of helping people with anxiety and depression, with weaker effects for stress, body image, and stigma; however, the authors noted major study limitations, including self-reporting, high median attrition rate (42%), and nonstandard interventions (which ranged from 1 to 28 podcast episodes); in addition, some studies reported mixed or null effects.

Podcast-based interventions have often been studied as one component in a broader treatment plan. For example, a 2025 meta-analysis of podcast interventions across mental and physical health reported that most studies (41 of 51) examined podcasts within a multicomponent intervention.

== Other public services ==
Podcasts have been used for advocacy. The 5,500 locked-out staff of the Canadian Broadcasting Corporation were podcasting news and other programming during August and September 2005.

Podcasts have been used by law enforcement. In 2020, both the Chambersburg Police department in Pennsylvania and the Mount Pleasant Police Department of South Carolina released a podcast to provide a way for the community to get to know the department's officers.

News outlets distribute supplemental audio or video via podcasts. For example, Wikinews began to podcast its News Briefs in 2005. Companies also use podcasts to distribute their multimedia news to journalists and consumers through companies like MultiVu. In 2006, the online magazine Slate began textcasting articles to their readers, by attaching a written article to a blank audio file and delivering the content to readers through their regular podcasting mechanism.

Podcasts have been used for cultural or historic audio tours of cities. For example, there are audio tours of NYC, Norwich in Vermont, and Mission Hills in San Diego. Podcasts have also been used for unofficial audio tours of museums.

Podcasts have been used for local community news and issues. Podcasting has emerged as an effective independent outlet to share community stories of interest and engage on-demand with citizens on local issues. With the longer format and on-demand nature, local community podcasting allows for independent reporting accessible to a wider audience and broader demographic than traditional media channels.

== Discussion venues ==
8% of podcasts in the United States as of 2023 have a "discussion forum or Discord server" for their fans.

== See also ==
- History of podcasting
