= WPR =

WPR may refer to:

- War Powers Resolution, a 1973 U.S. federal law limiting the power of the president to declare war
- Washington Post Radio, a short-lived attempt to create an all-news radio network in Washington, D.C.
- West Point Route, a short hand name for the joint operations of the Atlanta and West Point Railroad and the Western Railway of Alabama
- Wisconsin Public Radio, a public-radio network in the U.S. state of Wisconsin
- Women's Parliamentary Radio, a British website
- Wyoming Public Radio, a public-radio network in the U.S. state of Wyoming
- Weka Pass Railway, a New Zealand heritage railway
- WPr, the German-language abbreviation of Wehrmacht Propaganda Troops (Wehrmachtpropaganda)
- WPR, IATA airport code for Capitán Fuentes Martínez Airport, Porvenir, Magallanes y Antártica Chilena, Chile
- Weighted proportionality (WPR), in fair cake-cutting, a kind of fair-division problem
- WPR Records, a music label founded in 2004 by Luxembourger jazz musician Gast Waltzing

== See also ==
- USCGC Ossipee (WPR-50), a United States Coast Guard cutter launched in 1915
- WPRS (disambiguation)
