= Rapradio.com =

Rapradio.com was the first online uncensored rap radio station started in 1995 by Sean Keith Roberts and Mark "Geronimo" Bingaman. RapRadio.com reported playlists to Source Magazine and Hits Magazine. RapRadio.com quickly gained notoriety in the radio and music scene. The website hosted many pre-programmed 2-8 hour segments of raw, uncensored rap unheard anywhere before.

Soon after launching, RapRadio.com joined forces with Def Jam Recordings to promote Warren G's album release party for Take a Look Over Your Shoulder released in 1997. Sean Keith Roberts and Mark Bingaman went into negotiations with Mark Cuban of AudioNet, which became Broadcast.com, to garner more streams to offer the radio program to a much larger audience. The negotiations fell through and Rapradio.com continued to forge ahead on its own.

Rapradio.com was featured in Billboard Magazine in the February 1, 1997, issue. RapRadio.com worked with record labels such as Island Records, Lil' Joe Records, Sunshine Records, Deathrow Records and Interscope Records and prominent record executives such as Jimmy Iovine, Martha Reynolds and Joyce Straws. At the time, Rapradio.com was streaming to 30,000 listeners and grew to 150,000 listeners before it closed. At the time, RapRadio.com utilized the RealAudio streaming servers.

RapRadio.com won the 1st Online Hip Hop Award in 1997 from the Online Hip Hop Awards in conjunction with SOHH (Support Online Hip Hop).

RapRadio.com closed its doors in 1999 due to a dispute over domain name ownership, lasting until a domain squatter, Sassan Panahi, grabbed the domain name and has been squatting ever since. Some RapRadio.com content can still be seen at the Internet Archive.
