= The Illusion of Independent Radio =

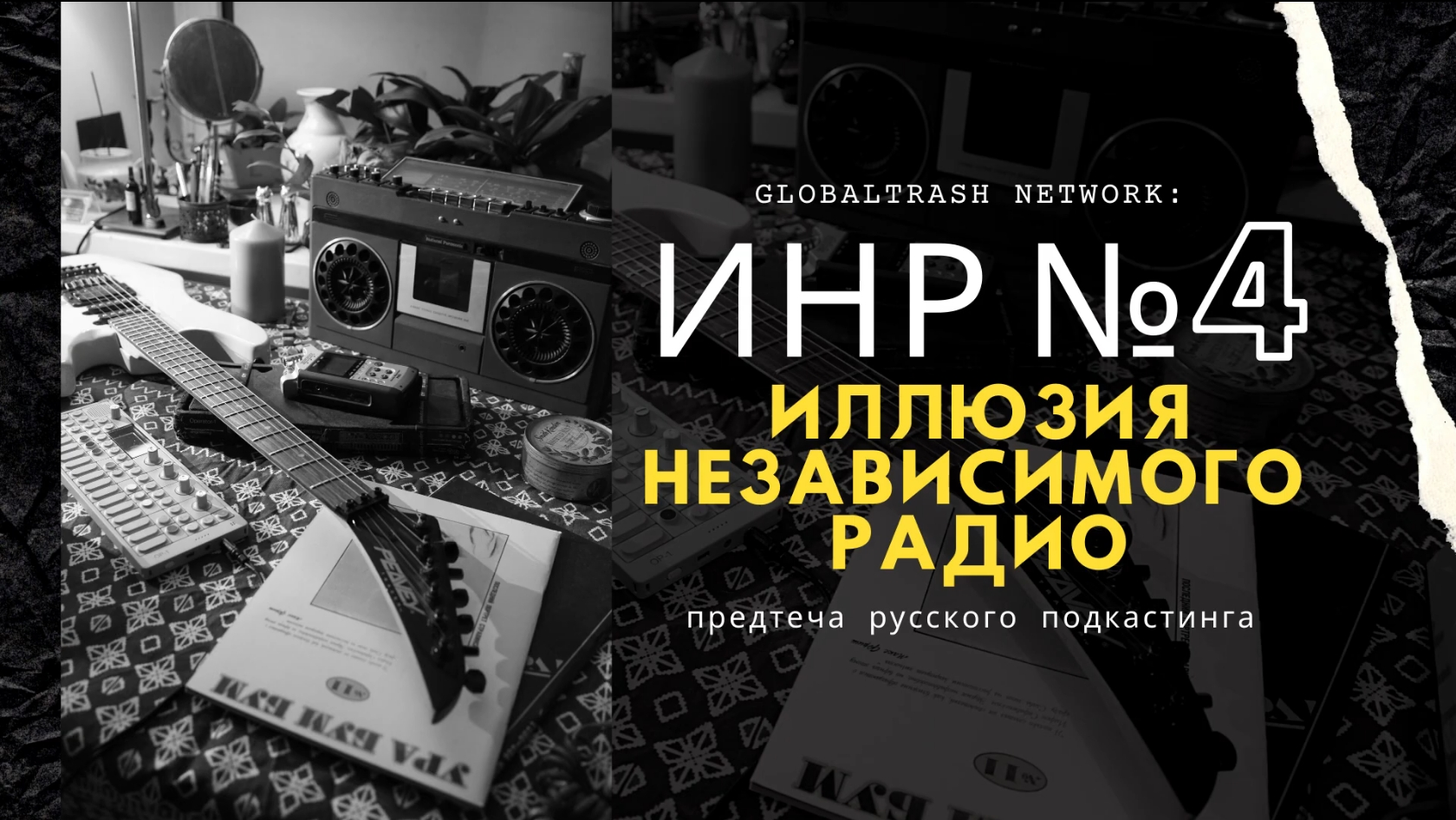
- Genre: Russian underground

Cast and voices
- Hosted by: G. Pilipenko, V. Posidelov

Publication
- Original release: 1989

Related
- Website: www.youtube.com/watch?v=BJ5C47M7AzU

The Illusion of Independent Radio — a Russian samizdat radio program, created in 1989 at Rostov-on-Don and distributed on tape reels and cassettes. It was the world's first (Soviet-Russian) prototype of podcasting, a media phenomenon that emerged in the 2000s.

== History ==
The Illusion of Independent Radio project was created in 1989 in Rostov-on-Don by journalists Galina Pilipenko and Valery Posidelov as a project related to their magazine, Hurray Boom-Boom!, samizdat devoted to the culture of the Russian underground.

Conceptually, The Illusion of Independent Radio was the forerunner of Russian podcasting, since the Internet did not exist, and attempts to go on the radio air were not considered in principle – due to the ferocity of South Russian media censorship. Independent radio appeared in Rostov-on-Don only in 1992 (Radio Provincia).

The first mention of The Illusion of Independent Radio appeared in the third issue of Hurray Boom-Boom! (1989).

Programs were recorded in a home studio and reproduced on reel-to-reel tape. Issues were distributed by subscription nationwide. As the creators of the project joked, it "went 'on the air' on a range of 49 meters to 5 liters multiplied by a dozen hecto-pascals".

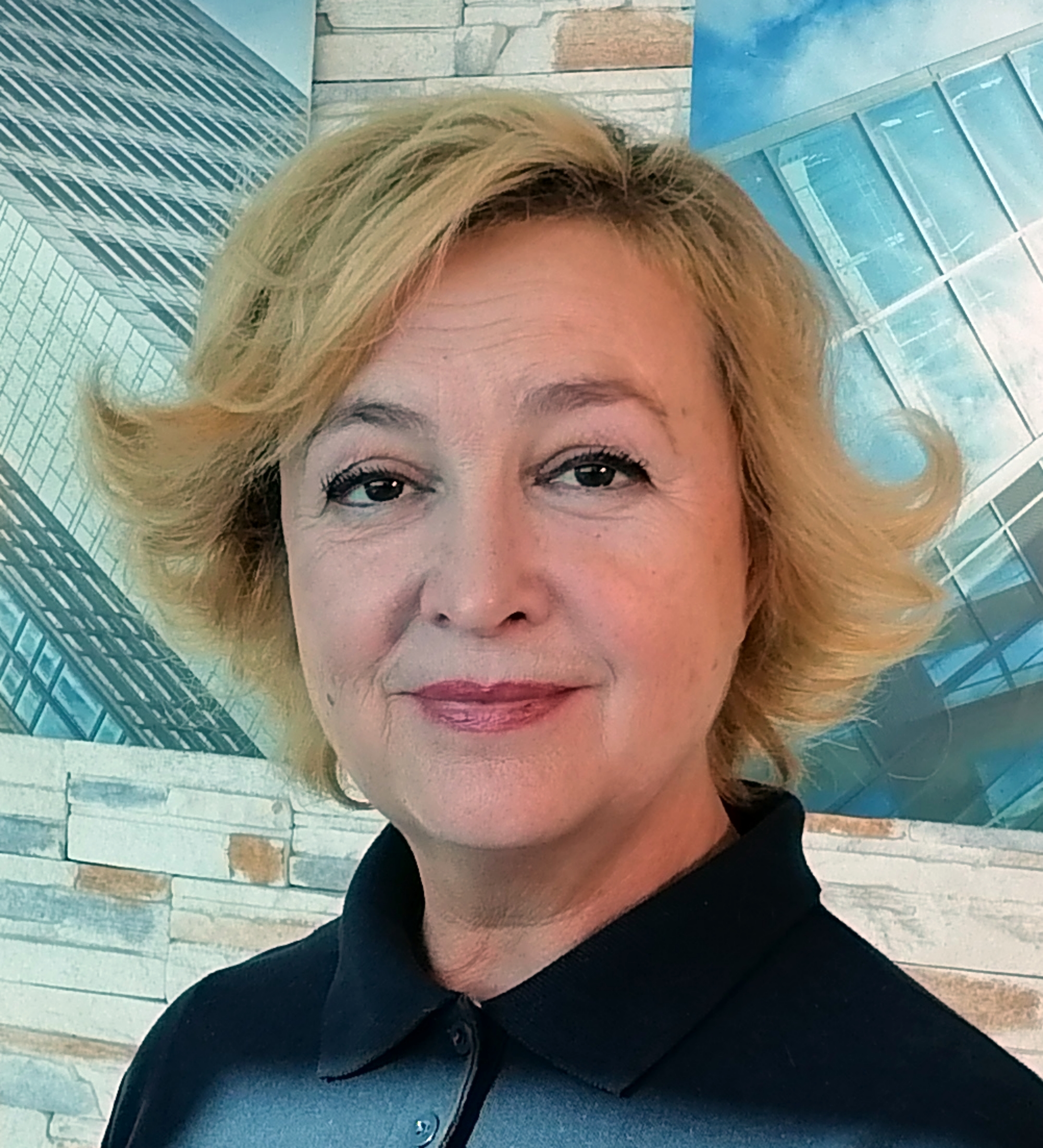
Galina Pilipenko, 2010

The first issue included tracks of Rostov underground rock bands Minstrel Theatre, There! No Nothing, ELEN, 12 Volt, Zazerkalye, Helicopter Blues Band, Novosibirsk band Classification D, Peter Svyatoslav Zaderiy, and interviews with Mike Naumenko, Sergei Firsov, and Yuri Naumov. BBCCorrespondent Oleg Nesterov and Yakov Kachur conducted a dialogue on the topic of musicians' emigration.

The second issue published a rare interview of Yegor Letov, given to a correspondent of Hurray Boom-Boom!.

Programs were developed by Galina Pilipenko, Valery Posidelov, and Andrei Baryshnikov. Baryshnikov was the voice of program under the pseudonym Andrei Wind, director of Valery Posidelov's rock band Day and Evening.

The author of the logo of the project was artist Fima Musailov (Efimius Musaymelidi).

Journalist Katerina Gordeeva wrote in 1995: "Hooray Boom Boom has another interesting quality: each issue has a sound supplement. Over the ten years of its existence, Hooray Boom Boom amassed a collection of rare recordings, including albums of 35 Ukrainian bands. Some English friends sent records by London bands.

A total of four issues were created.

== Issues ==
- «The Illusion of Independent Radio». Issue #1 (1989)
- «The Illusion of Independent Radio». Issue #4 (1990)
