= The Dan & Scott Show =

The Dan & Scott Show was an uncensored comedy program named for its hosts, Dan Schulz and Scott Wirkus. The show is credited as pioneering internet radio, with its uncensored comedy format that is now more commonplace both online and in satellite radio formats such as XM Satellite Radio and Sirius Satellite Radio.

The show was first made available as downloadable audio, an early form of podcasting, on AOL in 1995. It debuted as a live streaming audio format on April 1, 1996 first via Audionet.com AKA Broadcast.com. Throughout the show's five-year run, it moved from between several streaming providers such as Audionet, Audioactive, Talkspot.com, Radio HTB, and finally Eyada.com. They had the show on radiofun.com for a number of years as well.

The show was one of the few kept by Eyada in their restructuring attempts but in the end both the Dan and Scott show and Eyada failed to survive the tail end of the dot com crash of 2000-2001 due to Eyada's financial troubles.

The show first received national attention when Rick Rockwell, the bachelor from Who Wants to Marry a Multi-Millionaire? appeared on the show making a plea for contestants. The show also received attention for the weekly Survivor predictions from regular show caller "Jesus".

After trying to find another site to broadcast the show, it became apparent that the dot com crash had killed all the viable streamed radio sites on the market. After trying to work deals with many networks outside the streaming world in 2001–2002 they had a meeting with HBO. But HBO wanted a sanitized version of the show; Dan and Scott submitted a censored demo that exists but felt they just couldn't do the show HBO wanted. Then XM and Sirius also asked for a clean version of the show, which did not come to fruition there. Big supporter of the show and Eyada owner Bob Meyrowitz offered them a chance for a nationally syndicated morning radio show. Bob's big plan was for them to take on Howard Stern. Ultimately though, Scott and Dan decided to stop doing the show; they announced it was going on hiatus on August 24, 2002.
