= WPRS =

WPRS may refer to:

== Radio ==
- WPRS-FM, a radio station (104.1 FM) licensed to serve Waldorf, Maryland, United States
- WIBU, a defunct radio station (1440 AM) formerly licensed to serve Paris, Illinois, United States, which held the call sign WPRS until 2017
- WPRS-FM, former call sign (1952–1974; 98.3 FM) for radio station WWVR (FM), licensed to Paris, Illinois, United States

== Other ==
- Waterloo Regional Police Service (WPRS), in the Regional Municipality of Waterloo, Ontario, Canada
- West Palaearctic Regional Section (WPRS), part of the International Organization for Biological Control
- Welsh Paranormal Research Society (WPRS), the society that conducts research into claims of unexplained, supernatural phenomena, based in Wales, UK

== See also ==
- WPR (disambiguation)
