= Chris Brogan =

American author, journalist and marketing consultant

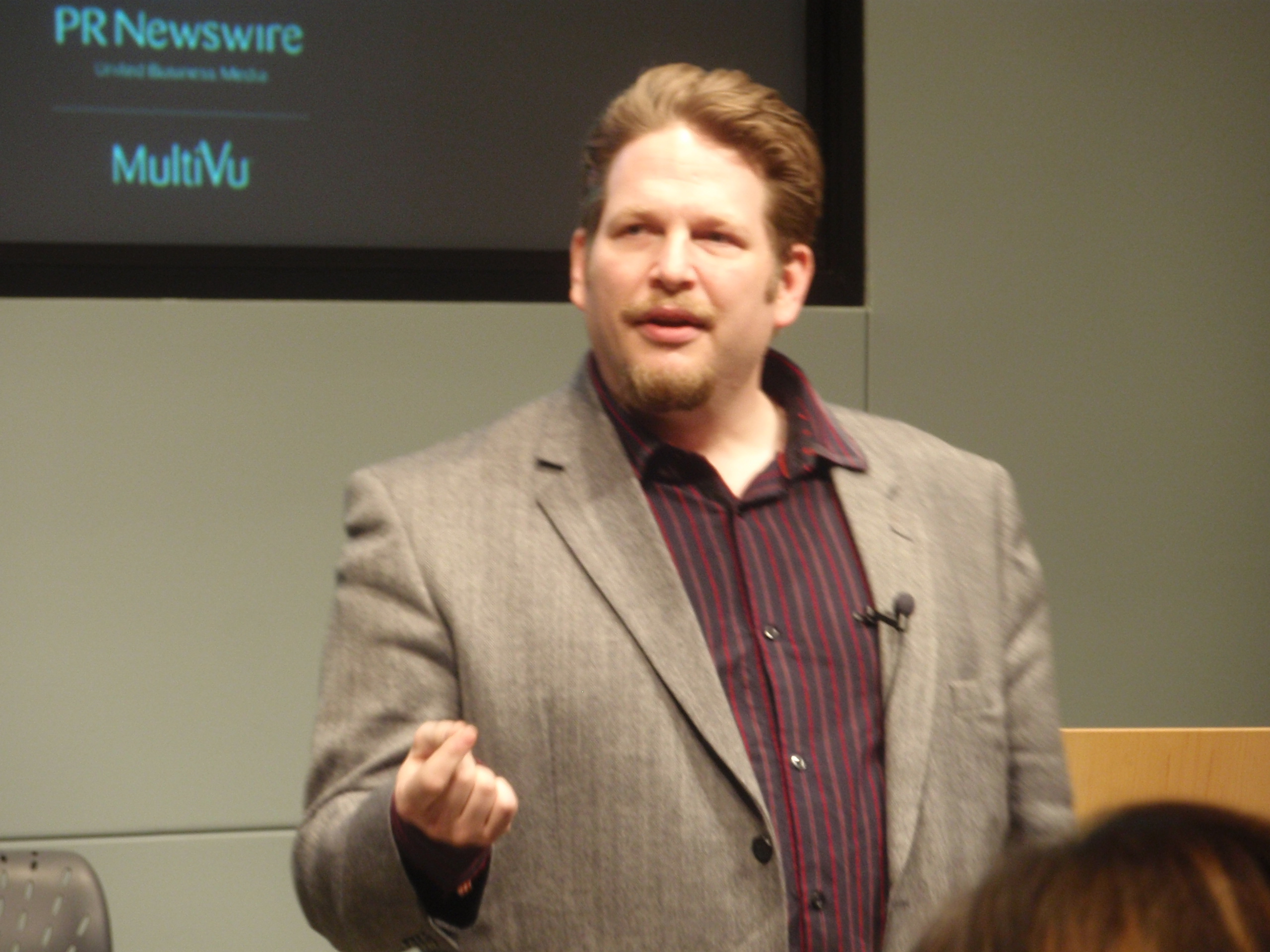
- Brogan in 2010
- Born: April 1, 1970 (age 55)
- Occupations: Speaker, author, marketing consultant
- Website: Official website

Chris Brogan (born April 1, 1970) is an American author, journalist, marketing consultant, and speaker about social media marketing.

== Early life and education ==
Brogan was born in Maine and has lived more than half of his life in northern part of Massachusetts.

== Career ==
Brogan's book, Trust Agents: Using the Web to Build Influence, Improve Reputation, and Earn Trust (2009), written with Julien Smith, became a New York Times bestseller, and hit the Wall Street Journal bestseller list (#8), and the Amazon top 100 list (#30). Brogan's second book was Social Media 101: Tactics and Tips to Develop Your Business Online (2010). His other titles include Google+ for Business and The Impact Equation (co-authored by Julien Smith).

Brogan wrote for Entrepreneur magazine. In 2012, his blog, chrisbrogan.com, was in the Top 5 of the now defunct Advertising Age "Power150" ratings. Chris launched the PodCamp unconference series (aimed at bringing together people interested in blogging, social media, social networking, podcasting, video on the net) with Christopher S. Penn. He Won the Mass High Tech All Stars award for 2008.

Chris Brogan is the president of Human Business Works and the founder of Kitchen Table Companies. Additionally, he used to serve on the board of advisors of HubSpot.

== See also ==
- Sol Orwell
- Steve Pavlina
- Ramit Sethi
- Tim Ferriss

== Publications ==
=== Books ===
- Brogan, Chris The Freaks Shall Inherit the Earth: Entrepreneurship for Weirdos, Misfits, and World Dominators. New York: John Wiley & Sons, 2014 ISBN 978-1118800553
- Brogan, Chris and Carly, Jacqueline Just Start Here: Lose Weight, Get Stronger and FINALLY Succeed at Your Goals. Boston: BossFit/Owner Media Group, 2014
- Brogan, Chris and Carly, Jacqueline Find Your Writing Voice. Owner Media Group, Inc., 2016 ISBN 978-1537476865, 1537476866
- Brogan, Chris and Fisher, Josh It's Not About the Tights: An Owners Manual on Bravery. Portland, Maine: Human Business Works, 2013
- Brogan, Chris and Fisher, Josh Superheroes in the Basement . Portland, Maine: Human Business Works, 2013
- Brogan, Chris and Smith, Julian The Impact Equation: Are You Making Things Happen or Just Making Noise?. New York: Portfolio Hardcover, 2012 ISBN 978-1591844907
- Brogan, Chris Google+ for Business: How Google's Social Network Changes Everything. Indianapolis, Indiana : Que Publishing, 2011 ISBN 978-0789749147
- Brogan, Chris Social Media 101: Tactics and Tips to Develop Your Business Online. New York : John Wiley & Sons, 2011 ISBN 978-0470563410
- Brogan, Chris and Smith, Julian Trust Agents: Using the Web to Build Influence, Improve Reputation, and Earn Trust. New York: John Wiley & Sons], 2009 ISBN 978-0470743089
