= Broadcast.com =

Defunct Internet radio company

- Website type: Broadcasting; Internet radio
- Owner: Yahoo!
- Founders: Cameron C. Jaeb; Todd Wagner; Mark Cuban; Martin Woodall
- Commercial: Yes
- Launched: September 1995; 31 years ago (as AudioNet)
- Current status: Discontinued

Broadcast.com was one of the first Internet radio and streaming media companies. It was founded as Cameron Audio Networks in 1989 by Cameron Christopher Jaeb. In 1995, Todd Wagner and Mark Cuban invested in the company and took over daily operations, renaming it Audionet, then Broadcast.com in 1998. In 1999, it was acquired by Yahoo in its most expensive acquisition ever (as of 2025), making Mark Cuban a billionaire. In 2002, the service was discontinued.

The company streamed 448 radio stations and 65 television stations, including 24-hour/day coverage from BBC and CNN. It had license deals with 450 college and professional sports teams. It also had available for streaming 1,500 films, 1,600 audiobooks, and more than 3,000 music albums.

== History ==
The company was founded in 1989 as Cameron Audio Networks, named after its founder Cameron Christopher Jaeb, who received an initial investment from his father. Jaeb wanted a platform for people to be able to listen to out-of-town sports games. The original idea, a shortwave radio that would receive broadcasts inside a sports venue, morphed into a handheld device that would receive customized satellite broadcasts.

Jaeb then began soliciting the rights to broadcast radio and professional sports games live on the Internet, making 80–100 calls per day.

In 1994, through a class that his girlfriend was taking, Jaeb was introduced to Todd Wagner, an attorney at Akin Gump Strauss Hauer & Feld. Wagner introduced Jaeb to Mark Cuban, who invested $10,000 in exchange for 2% of the company. Cuban wanted to listen to the basketball games of his alma mater, Indiana University. Many others were skeptical that there was a use for the service, which only recreated what was offered by traditional radio.

In September 1995, Cuban and Wagner then worked out a deal whereby Jaeb kept 10% of the company and got a monthly salary of $2,500 for part-time work but Cuban took control of the company, which was renamed AudioNet.com. At first, Cuban picked up signals from KLIF (AM) in his bedroom and then streamed them on the Internet. The company expanded from sporting events and broadcast the United States presidential nominating conventions and many other events.

In 1998, AudioNet was renamed to Broadcast.com and in July 1998, the company became a public company via an initial public offering. The stock price soared 250% on its first day of trading, a record for an IPO. After the IPO, the company was worth $1 billion, Mark Cuban was worth $300 million, and Todd Wagner was worth $170 million.

In February 1999, the company hosted the first major webcast in history, the Victoria's Secret Fashion Show, which attracted 1.5 million viewers. Despite some issues with the video and sound that left engineers scrambling, the event was a success.

On April 1, 1999, less than nine months after the IPO, Yahoo! announced the acquisition of Broadcast.com, which then had 570,000 users. The acquisition closed in July 1999 with Yahoo issuing 28.6 million shares of stock worth $5 billion for the Broadcast.com shares. Cuban sold most of his Yahoo! stock that same year, netting over $1 billion. Founder Chris Jaeb, whose stake was diluted to less than 1% of the company, received approximately $50 million from the sale.

The service became a part of Yahoo! Broadcast Services.

Yahoo! shuttered its broadcast services, including Broadcast.com, in 2002.

Yahoo!'s purchase of Broadcast.com has since been called one of the worst Internet acquisitions of all time.

== See also ==
- List of Internet radio stations
- List of online music databases
- The Dan & Scott Show
