= Steve Pavlina =

American self-help author, motivational speaker, and entrepreneur

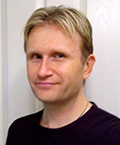
- Steve Pavlina in 2010
- Born: Stephen Michael Pavlina; April 14, 1971 (age 55); Santa Monica, California, U.S.
- Occupations: Blogger, motivational speaker, author
- Spouses: Erin Pavlina (m. 1998; div. 2009) Rachelle Fordyce (m. 2018)
- Children: 2
- Relatives: Christine Pavlina (sister)
- Website: stevepavlina.com

Steve Pavlina (born April 14, 1971) is an American self-help guru, motivational speaker and entrepreneur. He is the author of the web site stevepavlina.com and the book Personal Development for Smart People.

== Background ==
Steve was born and raised in Los Angeles, the eldest of four kids. During his childhood, Steve went to a private Jesuit high school.

On January 27, 1991 Pavlina was arrested for grand theft in Sacramento, California and given 60 hours of community service. He claims that this was the impetus he needed to turn his life around, he also claims that he was let off a much worse sentence owing to a mistake in the legal process.

Prior to starting his personal development site, Pavlina founded Dexterity Software, an independent computer game developer and publisher. He described in a blog post how he transitioned from one identity (as a game publisher, forum participant etc.) into a public speaker and self-help blogger, by removing shortcuts from his desktops and favorites, reducing anything gamer-related, such as contacts, obligations, e-mails, and relationships, in order to be surrounded by an environment that completely reinforced the new identity.

Steve Pavlina served as Vice President of the Association of Software Professionals (ASP) in 1999 and President of the ASP in 2000. By this stage, Steve's writings in the software development community were already having some impact. The ASP's Hall of Fame page describes him as having had "a significant, lasting influence on others via his articles and postings".

In 2004, Steve Pavlina began a web site and blog dedicated to personal development, StevePavlina.com ("Personal Development for Smart People"). Dexterity Software went dormant at this time and on October 31, 2006, Steve closed Dexterity Software in order (he said) to focus full-time on the website and blog.

On October 15, 2008, Hay House published Pavlina's book Personal Development For Smart People. The book expands upon several topics featured on his blog.

== Personal development blog ==
Pavlina's blog covers topics such as personal development and success; consciousness and courage; productivity, motivation and goal setting; career, wealth and business; and spirituality. One trial he allegedly performed involved polyphasic sleep, with a related article on early rising appearing in the British newspaper The Guardian and other newspapers and magazines. He has also promoted veganism, having been one since 1997.

On December 15, 2010, Steve Pavlina released all the content he had created until that date (excluding his book Personal Development For Smart People), as well as all content that he would create in the future (unless explicitly specified) in the public domain.

== Influence ==
In 2013, actress Lindsay Lohan got a tattoo based on the "truth, love, power" triangle from Steve Pavlina's book, blogging an image from Pavlina's book representing the triangle.

== Sources ==
- Gallagher, David F. (2001-06-13), "They Give It Away, Get Plenty Back", The New York Times, p. 23
- Sutton, Neil (2001-07-20), "Calgary association aims to crack pirates", Computer Dealer News, 17 (15): 30, ISSN 1184-2369
- Loftus, Tom (2003-07-31). "Fast, cheap and everywhere". NBC News.
- Sosnowski, Carolyn J (2007-04-01), "Even if Your Boss Didn't Spell It Out, Writing Is Part of Your Job Description", Information Outlook, 11 (4): 11, ISSN 1091-0808
- Belkin, Lisa (2007-05-31), "Time Wasted? Perhaps It's Well Spent", The New York Times, p. 2
