= Libsyn =

American podcasting company

Liberated Syndication, Inc. (Libsyn) is an American podcasting company founded in 2004 in Pittsburgh, Pennsylvania. As of 2026, Libsyn is headquartered out of Dallas, Texas.

== History ==
Liberated Syndication (shortened to Libsyn) was founded as WebMayhem, which was incorporated in Pittsburgh by students at the University of Pittsburgh David J. Chekan, Matthew T. Hoopes, Martin Mulligan, and David Mansueto. They established the company as Emayhem in 1998, as an art collective / publishing platform created for Pittsburgh artists and musicians to share their work online. They morphed that business into a web design firm called Webmayhem in 2000 and in 2004, they started the Emayhem Radio Podcast and created their first RSS feed. In an effort to save money, Mansueto leased some cheaper servers and laced them together, effectively creating a content delivery network (CDN). This CDN would become the first podcast hosting platform, allowing independent creators to upload media and syndicate it.

The founders named this new venture “Liberated Syndication” with the goal of allowing creators the freedom to have their voices distributed and heard everywhere. At around this time, they registered libsyn.com and libsyn.org.

Some of the early high-profile podcasting clients of the service included National Public Radio, Marc Maron, Senator Barack Obama, National Geographic, and Grammar Girl.

When Marc Maron interviewed President Barack Obama on his podcast WTF with Marc Maron in 2015, it was the first podcast episode ever to have more than 1 million downloads within the first 24 hours of its release.

Libsyn also served as an early host for video, Tikibar TV, making them the first, and still one of few podcast hosting companies that support video distribution. The company today supports distribution to YouTube.

In 2006, Wizzard Software Corporation acquired Libsyn — creating Wizzard Media. In 2012, Wizzard Software Corporation merged with Digital Entertainment International. In 2016, Libsyn was spun-off as an independent, public company.

Libsyn delivered more than 4 billion downloads for the Joe Rogan podcast — the first podcast to have over 1 billion downloads.

The company also delivered more than 1 billion downloads for the Dave Ramsey Show. Libsyn is the only host to have two different podcasts deliver more than 1 billion downloads from its servers.

In 2020, Libsyn earned revenue of $25.8 million, nearly all of which was derived from the Company’s hosting business. In 2021, increased revenue by 63% to $42.1 million, which included approximately 37% from advertising sales. In 2022, Libsyn announced unaudited revenue to $58.7 million, including over 57% from advertising.

== Hosting ==
Libsyn was the first podcast hosting company, starting in November 2004. The company was founded more than 6 months prior to Apple supporting podcasts in iTunes. In 2009, Libsyn hosted over 13,000 podcast shows. Podcast shows on the Libsyn platform increased to over 35,000 in 2016 from 28,000 in 2015 and 22,000 in 2014. By 2021, the company served more than 75k podcasting customers with more than 7 million active episodes.

In 2023, Apple partnered with Libsyn and to launch delegated delivery, which allows Libsyn creators to publish to Apple Podcasts and Apple Podcasts Subscriptions directly.

== Advertising ==
Libsyn was one of the first companies to sell advertisements for podcasters. The company launched ad insertion tools capable of digital insertion of ads into podcasts and geographic targeting capabilities in 2007. In 2009, Libsyn executed 93 national brand advertising campaigns for companies, including Comcast, Ford, Navy Medical, Go Daddy, Direct TV and Starz HD with 61.9 million ad impressions generating $353,532 in advertising revenue. With the acquisition of AdvertiseCast, Libsyn sold advertisements for more than 1,500 podcasters. AdvertiseCast was shortly rebranded as Libsyn's AdvertiseCast Marketplace.

In November 2021, Libsyn's AdvertiseCast Marketplace acquired certain assets of Podgo Media LLC, a firm representing smaller podcasters giving those publishers access to some of the largest brand advertisers in the sector.

In October 2022, Libsyn announced advertising rates rose on average 4% year over year to $23.49 CPM.

== Pair Networks ==
In addition to hosting podcasts, Libsyn also owns Pair Networks, which was founded in 1996 and provides web hosting and domain registration services, including dedicated, shared, and managed WordPress hosting services and malware scanning tools. Libsyn acquired Pair Networks in December 2017 for $16 million.

Libsyn sold Pair Networks to the Dutch company Your.Online company in August 2024.

== Auxbus / Libsyn Studio ==
In Feb 2021, Libsyn acquired Auxbus, another podcast creation platform. The company relaunched Auxbus as Libsyn Studio, a program designed to guide podcasters through planning and creating content. The tool was integrated into all Libsyn packages a short time later. In early 2024, the Studio feature was necessarily discontinued.

== Subscriptions / Glow FM ==
Libsyn provides MyLibsyn custom apps for publishers to help publishers earn money from subscriptions and donations with their own publisher app.

In April 2021, Libsyn acquired Glow FM, a podcast monetization platform that enables podcasters to generate listener-supported revenue from subscriptions, membership programs and donations from all listening apps including Spotify, Apple, PocketCasts and others. Glow was rebranded as Libsyn's Glow and integrated into the Libsyn monetization platform.
