= Women's Parliamentary Radio =

British political Internet radio site

Women's Parliamentary Radio logo

Women's Parliamentary Radio is a website that broadcasts audio and video interviews with women MPs of all parties in the U.K.

All the interviews are pre-recorded and put on the website as reports which can be streamed and listened to immediately or downloaded as podcasts so that they can be listened to later. It covers topical current affairs that are of interest to women and their families. Where the issues that concern women are also championed by men, male MPs are interviewed, too.

== Aim ==
WPR has stated its aim as being "the Woman's Hour of Westminster, reporting fairly and accurately on policy issues of concern to women and their families". It was the creation of its executive producer, former BBC political editor Boni Sones OBE. Using her broadcast knowledge, she foresaw the huge technological shift that was in broadcast journalism through the relaxation of broadcasting laws in 2005 and advances in new technology taking place. Boni taught herself sound engineering techniques assisted by Peter Cook of the CART lab University of Cambridge and pioneered the first "as live" broadcast interviews online encouraged by women MPs at a Cabinet and Shadow Cabinet level including Theresa May MP, Caroline Spelman MP, Harriet Harman MP, Vera Baird MP, Sandra Gidley MP and Jo Swinson MP.

Boni took her web broadcasting work into Cambridge University's Judge Business School where she reported on business and economics leading up to, during and after the financial crash of 2008 and 2009. The London School of Economics now has an archive dedicated to her Parliamentary and university work as an early adopter of broadcast web journalism: the "Boni Sones Archive".

The British Library has a collection of 82 audio interviews Boni and her team conducted for a book on women in politics. Boni named the archive "The Harman Shephard" collection.

Boni used her web skills and modern developments in technology to self-publish books about her childhood growing up in Sizewell in Suffolk in the 1950s and being part of a family who lived off "the fat of the land". The books include The Mermaid's Tale, A Portrait of Suffolk, Two Mermaid's Together, Food on the Table - All in One, Dear Alex - All in One, All4Now, and Home Fires: 20 poems 4 2012. All are deposited in the British Library, and all are on Amazon.

== Audience reach ==
From January 2012 to January 2013 www.wpradio.co.uk and www.parliamentaryradio.com got over 2,000 visitors each month. In October 2012 it had 3,697 visits in one month. For the year it had 400,482 hits, 12,650 unique visitors, and 35,518 visits.

== History ==
The project has grown out of the publication of the book by Methuen in September 2005 Women in Parliament: The New Suffragettes Women in Parliament: The New Suffragettes] by Boni Sones, Margaret Moran and Professor Joni Lovenduski, where women talked frankly about their lives in Parliament and their achievements to date. The project's founders are concerned that, over ninety years after women won the right to stand for elections to the House of Commons in 1918, only one in five Members of Parliament is a woman.

The publication of the book led Roy Greenslade, then media commentator in the Guardian, to offer his own “mea culpa” to women MPs for the descriptions he has used of them. His article ended:

“It is sobering to realise that the suffragettes' original demand was simply to have the vote. Some saw that as the end in itself, others as the first step on a long road towards genuine equality. Modern women MPs are still travelling down that road and are right to complain that their feet are sore.”

Boni has been helped throughout in her work by journalist colleagues Jackie Ashley of the Guardian, Deborah McGurran of BBC East, Linda Fairbrother formerly of Anglia TV, and MPs working at a Senior Level across party including Gisela Stuart MP, Eleanor Laing MP, Baroness Susan Kramer, and Penny Mordaunt MP. The charity campaigner, Boo Armstrong, provided much-needed encouragement and support as an Advisory Board member in the early days.

Since WP Radio began in spring 2007, over 250 interviews nationally and internationally and 30 documentaries have been broadcast. It celebrated its sixth year of broadcasting and will become an Archive site only from summer 2013.

In January 2013 Boni's four portraits of women MPS party by party by Kieran Doherty who took the famous "Blair's Babes" photograph went on display at the National People's History Museum in Manchester as their “Object of the Month”. The United Nations has also collected them.

In October 2009 Boni displayed at the National Portrait Gallery and later in the Commons. These four group portraits to celebrate 90 years of women and the vote. She published a DVD of her and her colleagues' interviews and these portraits and sent to all women MPs.

In 2011 a new platform was launched — www.parliamentaryradio.com — after the London School of Economics took the www.wpradio.co.uk site into its Political Archives to preserve for historians.

Earlier in 2011 wpradio broadcast interviews with women MPs in the UK Parliament interviewing women MPs from other Parliaments using the telephone in place of a "line booking". One of the stated aims of wpradio was to "link in" women in Parliaments all over the world, thereby creating a radio online "World Service" reporting parliament by parliament.

In 2010 the broadcasts of wpradio were featured on a wall where audiences using headphones could listen to ten of its interviews at the well-received and reviewed Tricycle Theatre's Women Power and Politics plays.

In 2008 Women's Parliamentary Radio was shortlisted for Channel 4's Hansard Society Democracy Award. Boni Sones, executive producer of the channel, was nominated for the Dods and Scottish Widows female political journalist of the year award. In January 2009 she was appointed an OBE for "Services to Broadcasting and Public Relations".

www.wpradio.co.uk is based partially in the Parliamentary Lobby and was assisted by Muir Morton, the then Deputy Serjeant-at-Arms in the House, and the late Brian Shallcross, of GCap Media, and a former chairman of the Lobby who saw the need for a new broadcaster on behalf of women MPs themselves and the potential of new media.

Their resulting 550 interviews over 15 years can now be found in one of four audio Archives nationally at the British Library, the London School of Economics, The History of Parliament Trust and now the Churchill Archives University of Cambridge. Sones has also written four books about these podcast interviews and archives which are in all the major Libraries of the UK.
