= Manayunk Expressway =

Route information
- Length: 16 mi (26 km)
- Existed: 1962–1970s (never built)

Major junctions
- West end: I-276 / I-476 / Penna Turnpike in Plymouth Meeting
- Ten Mile Loop Expressway near Conshohocken US 1 in Philadelphia; Girard Avenue Expressway in Philadelphia I-676 / US 30 in Philadelphia
- East end: I-76 / I-695 in Philadelphia

Location
- Country: United States
- State: Pennsylvania

Highway system
- Pennsylvania State Route System; Interstate; US; State; Scenic; Legislative

The Manayunk Expressway (or alternatively the Manayunk Parkway) was a proposed parkway that was to run along the east bank of the Schuylkill River similar to the Moses parkways of New York City, first proposed in 1932 by the Regional Planning Federation (predecessor to the Delaware Valley Regional Planning Commission). It was originally designed to connect Fairmount Park in Philadelphia with Norristown. The purpose was to have served as an alternate route to the Schuylkill Expressway and Germantown Pike that by 1960 had become congested.

== Route description ==
The Manayunk Expressway was to begin in Plymouth Meeting, Montgomery County, at the Mid-County Interchange where I-276 (Pennsylvania Turnpike) and I-476 (Blue Route/Northeast Extension) currently meet. From here, the road was to head south, bypassing Conshohocken to the east. The Manayunk Expressway would turn southeast and follow the east bank of the Schuylkill River, and there would have also been an intersection to the Ten Mile Loop expressway. The road would head into Philadelphia and possibly follow the path of the Manayunk Canal. Around Gustine Lake, the Manayunk Expressway would have an interchange with US 1 (Roosevelt Expressway). The freeway could have intersected with the Girard Avenue Expressway. The road was to pass through Center City and intersect with I-676/US 30. The Manayunk Expressway would continue to its terminus at I-76 (Schuylkill Expressway) near the Grays Ferry Avenue / University Avenue exit with possible connections to I-695.

== History ==
The Manayunk Parkway was proposed by the Regional Planning Federation (predecessor to the Delaware Valley Regional Planning Commission) in 1932 to connect Fairmount Park in Philadelphia with Norristown, running along the Schuylkill River. However, this parkway was never built. By 1960, traffic became a major issue on the Schuylkill Expressway, with the Keystone Automobile Club recommending a freeway along the east bank of the Schuylkill River. In 1962, the Pennsylvania Highway Department announced plans for the Manayunk Expressway to be a 16-mile-long (26 km) route extending from current I-276/I-476 in Plymouth Meeting to current I-76 in South Philadelphia. However, plans for the freeway were canceled with Kelly Drive being designated a scenic route. In 1969, a shortened version of the Manayunk Expressway called the North Shore Expressway was proposed to run from Plymouth Meeting south to the proposed Ten Mile Loop. Plans for this freeway were eventually dropped.
