= North–South Freeway =

North–South Freeway can refer to any of the following roads:

- North–South Freeway (New Jersey)
- North–South Freeway (Wisconsin), an alternate name for Interstate 43 in the Milwaukee area
