= Interstate 76 (Ohio–New Jersey) =

Interstate Highway in the United States

Interstate 76
- I-76 highlighted in red

Route information
- Maintained by ODOT, OTIC, PTC, PennDOT, DRPA, and NJDOT
- Length: 435.66 mi (701.13 km)
- Existed: 1964–present
- NHS: Entire route
- Restrictions: No hazardous goods allowed in tunnels in Pennsylvania

Major junctions
- West end: I-71 / US 224 near Westfield Center, OH
- I-77 in Akron, OH; I-80 / Ohio Turnpike near Youngstown, OH; I-79 / US 19 in Cranberry Township, PA; I-376 / US 22 / US 22 Bus. in Monroeville, PA; I-70 from New Stanton, PA to Breezewood, PA; I-83 near Harrisburg, PA; I-276 Toll / Penna Turnpike in King of Prussia, PA; I-476 near West Conshohocken, PA; I-676 / US 30 in Philadelphia, PA; I-95 in Philadelphia, PA
- East end: I-295 / Route 42 in Bellmawr, NJ

Location
- Country: United States
- States: Ohio, Pennsylvania, New Jersey
- Counties: OH: Medina, Summit, Portage, Mahoning; PA: Lawrence, Beaver, Butler, Allegheny, Westmoreland, Somerset, Bedford, Fulton, Huntingdon, Franklin, Cumberland, York, Dauphin, Lebanon, Lancaster, Berks, Chester, Montgomery, Philadelphia; NJ: Camden

Highway system
- Interstate Highway System; Main; Auxiliary; Suffixed; Business; Future
← SR 75	OH	→ SR 76
← PA 75	PA	→ PA 76
← Route 75	NJ	→ Route 76
← Route 76	76C	→ Route 77

Interstate 76 (I-76) is an east–west Interstate Highway in the Eastern United States. The highway runs approximately 435.66 miles (701.13 km) from an interchange with I-71 west of Akron, Ohio, east to I-295 in Bellmawr, New Jersey. This route is not contiguous with I-76 in Colorado and Nebraska.

Starting in Ohio, the highway runs west of Akron to west of Youngstown, where it joins the Ohio Turnpike as a toll road. At the Pennsylvania state line, the Ohio Turnpike ends and becomes the Pennsylvania Turnpike, also a tolled facility. Along the turnpike, the route runs approximately 326 miles (525 km) across most of the southern portion of the state, serving the Pittsburgh and Harrisburg areas. At the Valley Forge Interchange, I-76 leaves the turnpike and turns southeast on the Schuylkill Expressway, where it parallels the Schuylkill River toward the city of Philadelphia. After entering Philadelphia, I-76 crosses the Delaware River on the Walt Whitman Bridge into New Jersey. After only about three miles (4.8 km) in New Jersey along the North–South Freeway, I-76 reaches its eastern terminus, though the freeway continues south as Route 42.

== Route description ==
Lengths
	mi	km
OH	81.65	131.40
PA	350.97	564.83
NJ	3.04	4.89
Total	435.66	701.13

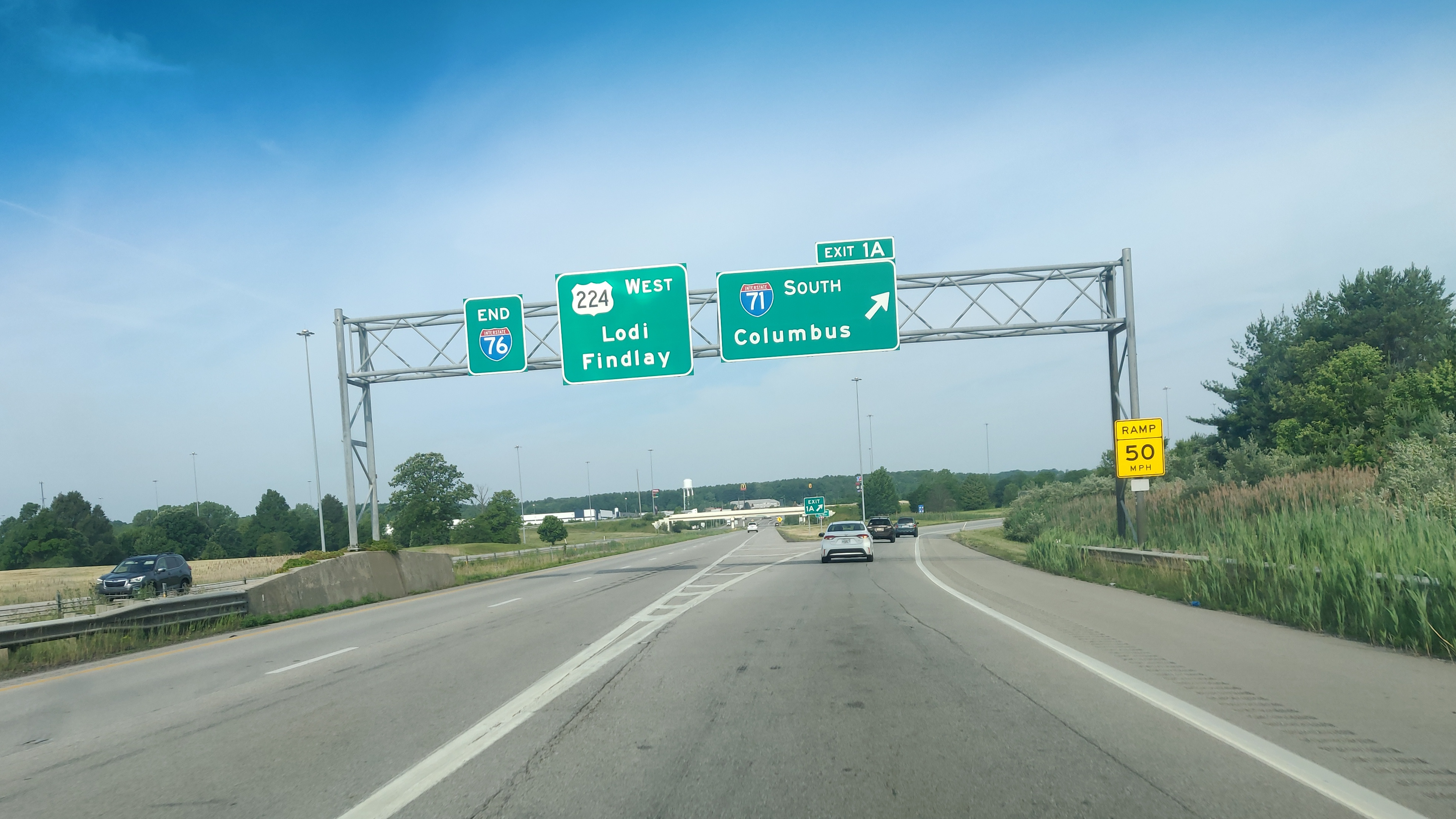
The western terminus of I-76 in Ohio at I-71

=== Ohio ===
I-76 begins at exit 209 of I-71 in Westfield Township, approximately six miles (9.7 km) east of Lodi, Ohio; U.S. Route 224 (US 224) continues west from the end of I-76. The interchange was previously a double trumpet but was reconstructed in 2010. Officially, I-76 begins at the beginning of the ramp from I-71 north; it merges with US 224 at mile 0.61. After passing through rural Medina County, I-76 enters Summit County and soon crosses State Route 21 (SR 21, old US 21), once the main north–south route through the area until I-77 replaced it, at a cloverleaf interchange. I-76 then passes through Wadsworth, Norton, and Barberton and then enters Akron; this section of road was built as US 224.

Soon after entering Akron, I-76 turns north onto the short Kenmore Expressway. US 224 leaves I-76 there and continues east with I-277 toward I-77. Shortly after heading north from the I-277 interchange, I-76 meets I-77 and again turns east, joining southbound I-77 south of downtown Akron on the West Expressway. A partial interchange provides access to SR 59 (the Innerbelt), and then I-76 crosses through the Central Interchange, where I-77 goes south (on the South Expressway) and SR 8 begins to the north (on the North Expressway); I-76 switches from the West Expressway to the East Expressway.

Leaving the Akron area, I-76 again heads through rural areas, crossing Portage County and entering Mahoning County.

West of Youngstown, the freeway intersects the Ohio Turnpike and I-80 via a double trumpet interchange, and the two Interstates swap rights-of-way. I-76 joins the Ohio Turnpike and heads southeast toward Pittsburgh, while I-80 exits the turnpike and continues east toward Youngstown on I-76's alignment. The Ohio Turnpike carries I-76 until the Pennsylvania border, where it becomes the Pennsylvania Turnpike.

=== Pennsylvania ===
==== Pennsylvania Turnpike ====
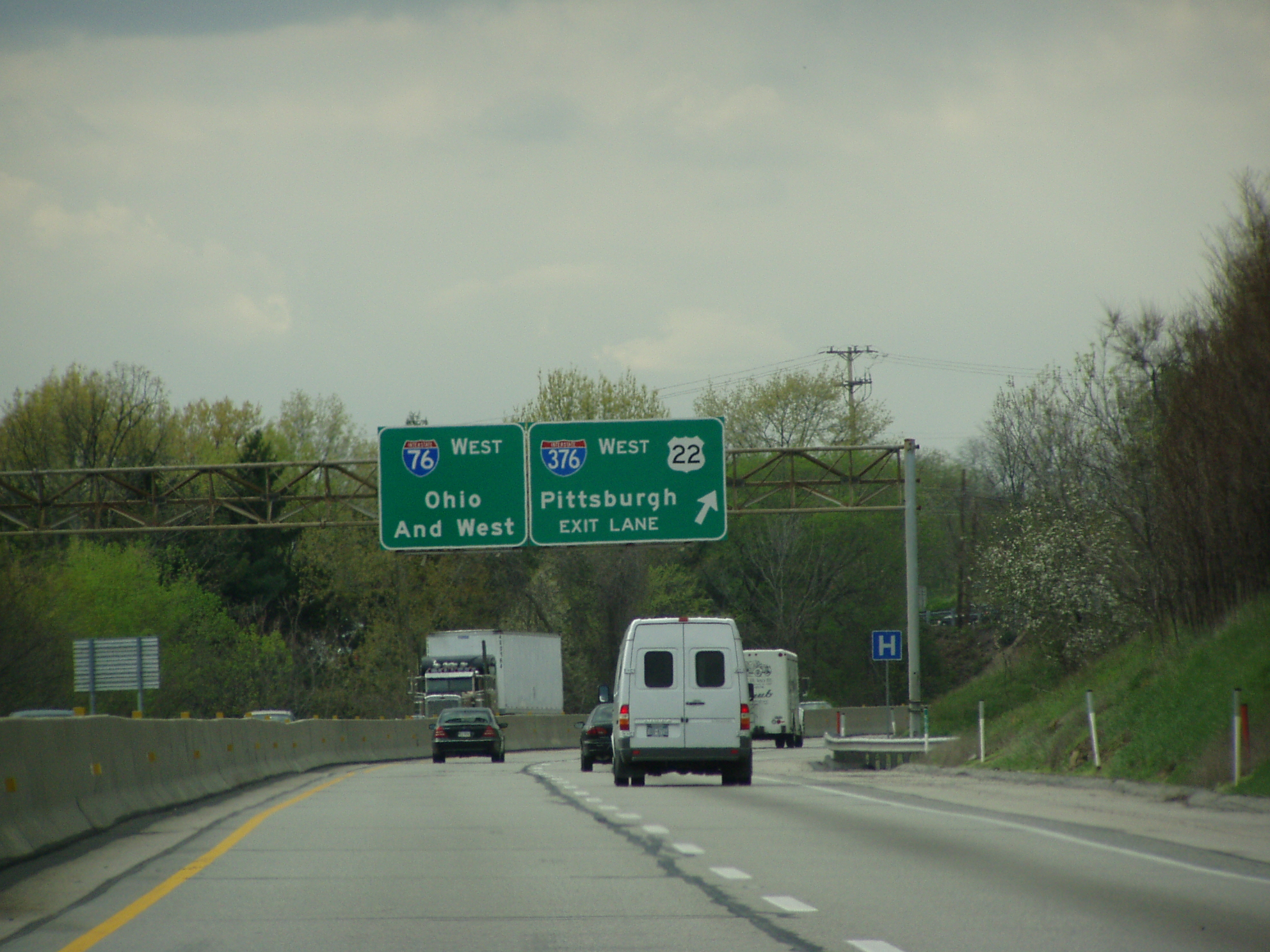
I-76 (Pennsylvania Turnpike) westbound approaching the Pittsburgh interchange, exit 57 (I-376/US 22)

From the Ohio border, the Pennsylvania Turnpike carries I-76 into and across most of Pennsylvania, bypassing Youngstown, Ohio to the south and Pittsburgh to the north. There is a free interchange with US 19 and I-79 near Wexford. At one point, I-76 used to begin in Pittsburgh on a route that was signed as I-376 around the 1970s. It intersects with this highway in Monroeville.

From New Stanton to Breezewood, I-76 is concurrent with I-70. In this section are the bypass (built in the 1960s) of the Laurel Hill Tunnel, then the still-in-use Allegheny Mountain Tunnel in a relatively unpopulated section of South Central Pennsylvania, and then an indirect connection with I-99 in Bedford. The turnpike also passes through the Somerset Wind Farm and is the closest Interstate highway to the Flight 93 National Memorial in Shanksville.

At Breezewood, I-70 exits the turnpike (making use of a short stretch of the old alignment of the Pennsylvania Turnpike), while I-76 bypasses the Rays Hill and Sideling Hill tunnels along a new alignment built in the 1960s. The major features of this section are more mountains with the Tuscarora Mountain Tunnel and then a double tunnel (Kittatinny/Blue Mountain) prior to Pennsylvania Route 997 (PA 997) near Shippensburg. I-76 intersects I-81 (indirectly) in Carlisle then I-83 and I-283 near Harrisburg, bypassing Harrisburg to the south. The Susquehanna River Bridge is a six-lane bridge that was constructed in 2003 using precast segments that replaced an older bridge across the Susquehanna River. In Morgantown, I-176 provides a connection north to Reading. At Valley Forge, I-76 diverges toward Philadelphia, but the turnpike (as I-276) bypasses it to the north.

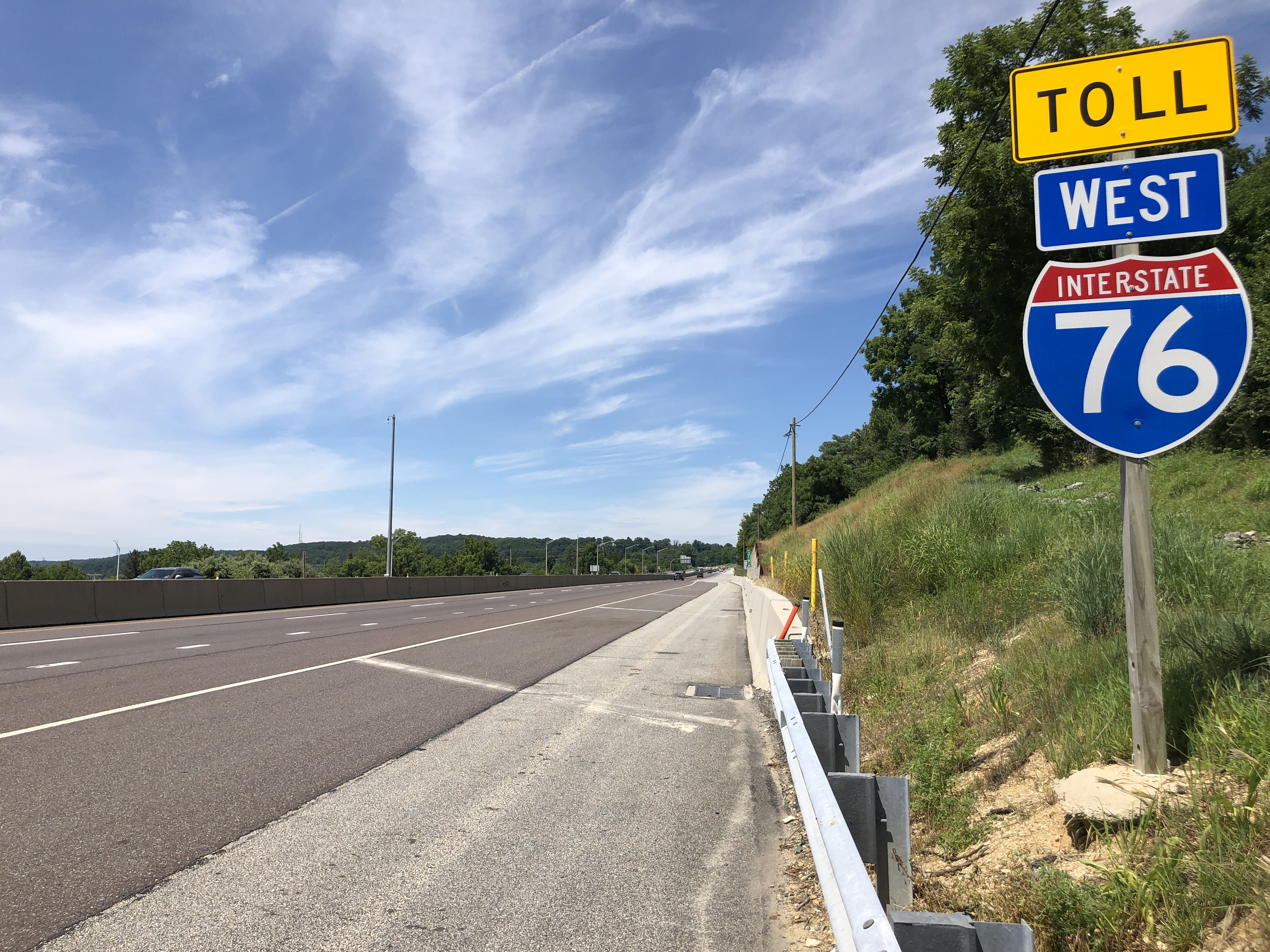
I-76 (Pennsylvania Turnpike) westbound past the PA 29 interchange in Charlestown Township, Pennsylvania

==== Schuylkill Expressway ====
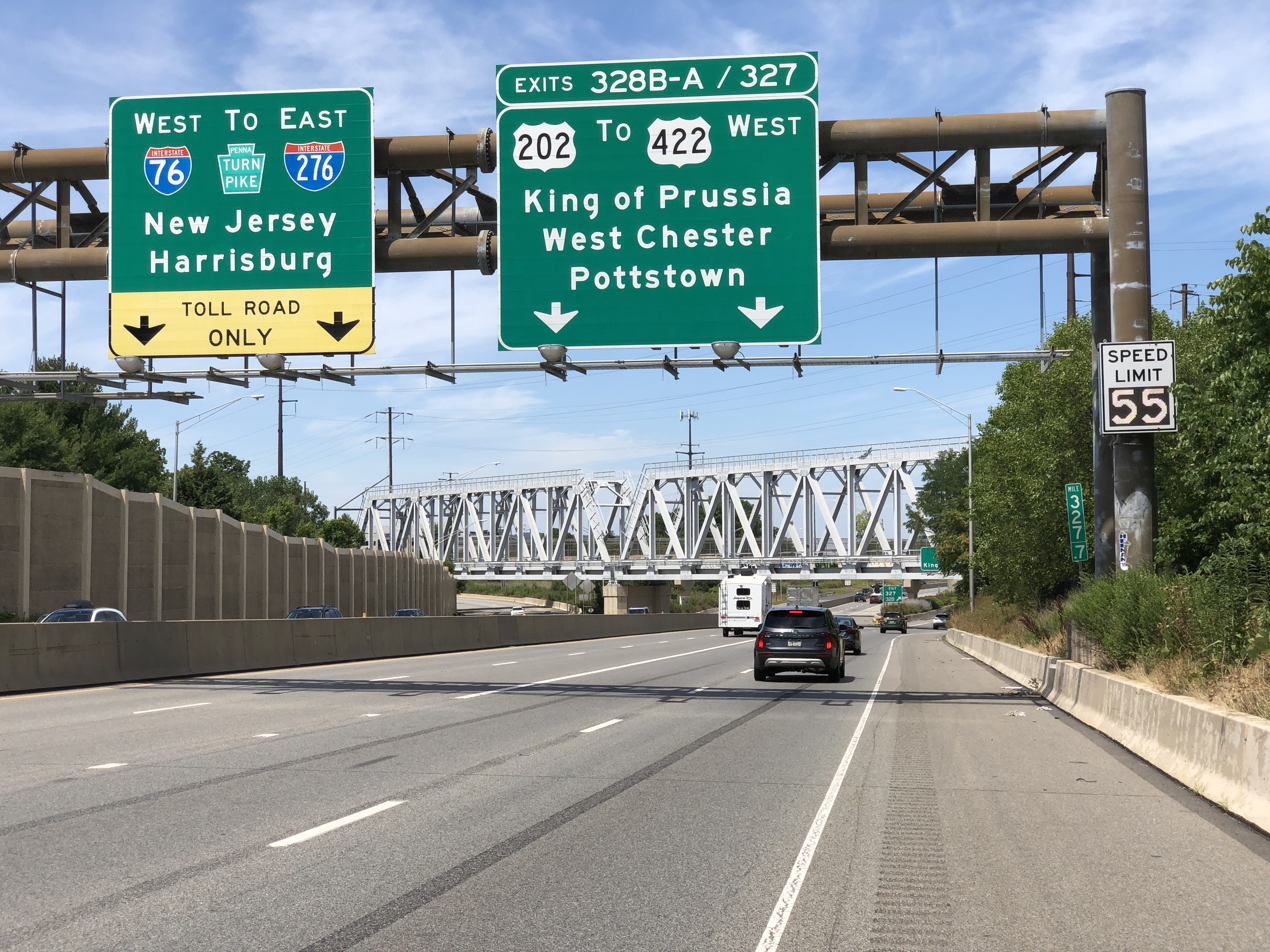
Schuylkill Expressway westbound approaching the US 202/US 422 interchange in King of Prussia

The Schuylkill Expressway begins at the Valley Forge interchange of the Pennsylvania Turnpike in the community of King of Prussia in Upper Merion Township, Montgomery County. The I-76 designation continues west on the Pennsylvania Turnpike from this point, while the Pennsylvania Turnpike from this point east is designated I-276. The road heads southeast from the trumpet interchange as a nine-lane freeway carrying four westbound lanes and five eastbound lanes that is designated as part of I-76, passing through the Valley Forge Interchange toll plaza. Past the toll plaza, the Schuylkill Expressway narrows to four lanes, with two lanes in each direction, and comes to an eastbound exit and entrance with North Gulph Road, providing access to Valley Forge National Historical Park and the Village at Valley Forge residential and retail development, the latter of which contains the King of Prussia Town Center lifestyle center, and a westbound exit and entrance with Mall Boulevard, providing access to the King of Prussia Mall to the northeast of the road. There is also a westbound entrance from Pulaski Drive just east of the toll plaza. The freeway passes businesses and comes to an interchange with U.S. Route 202 (US 202), the eastern terminus of US 422, and Swedesford Road that serves King of Prussia. A westbound collector–distributor road carrying two lanes provides access to the US 202/US 422/Swedesford Road and Mall Boulevard interchanges. I-76 passes under Chester Valley Trail and Norfolk Southern Railway's Dale Secondary railroad line and continues east-southeast as a four-lane road between residential areas to the southwest and commercial areas to the northeast. The freeway heads east and comes to a westbound exit and entrance with South Gulph and South Henderson roads. The Schuylkill Expressway curves southeast near wooded areas of homes before coming to an interchange with Pennsylvania Route 320 (PA 320) in the community of Gulph Mills. This interchange has an eastbound exit and entrance and a westbound exit. Within this interchange, the highway passes over SEPTA's Norristown High Speed Line and crosses Gulph Creek. Past the PA 320 interchange, I-76 continues east-southeast through woodland near residential development, heading into Lower Merion Township. The freeway enters West Conshohocken and comes to an interchange with I-476 that also has ramps providing access to PA 23 and serving West Conshohocken and Conshohocken.

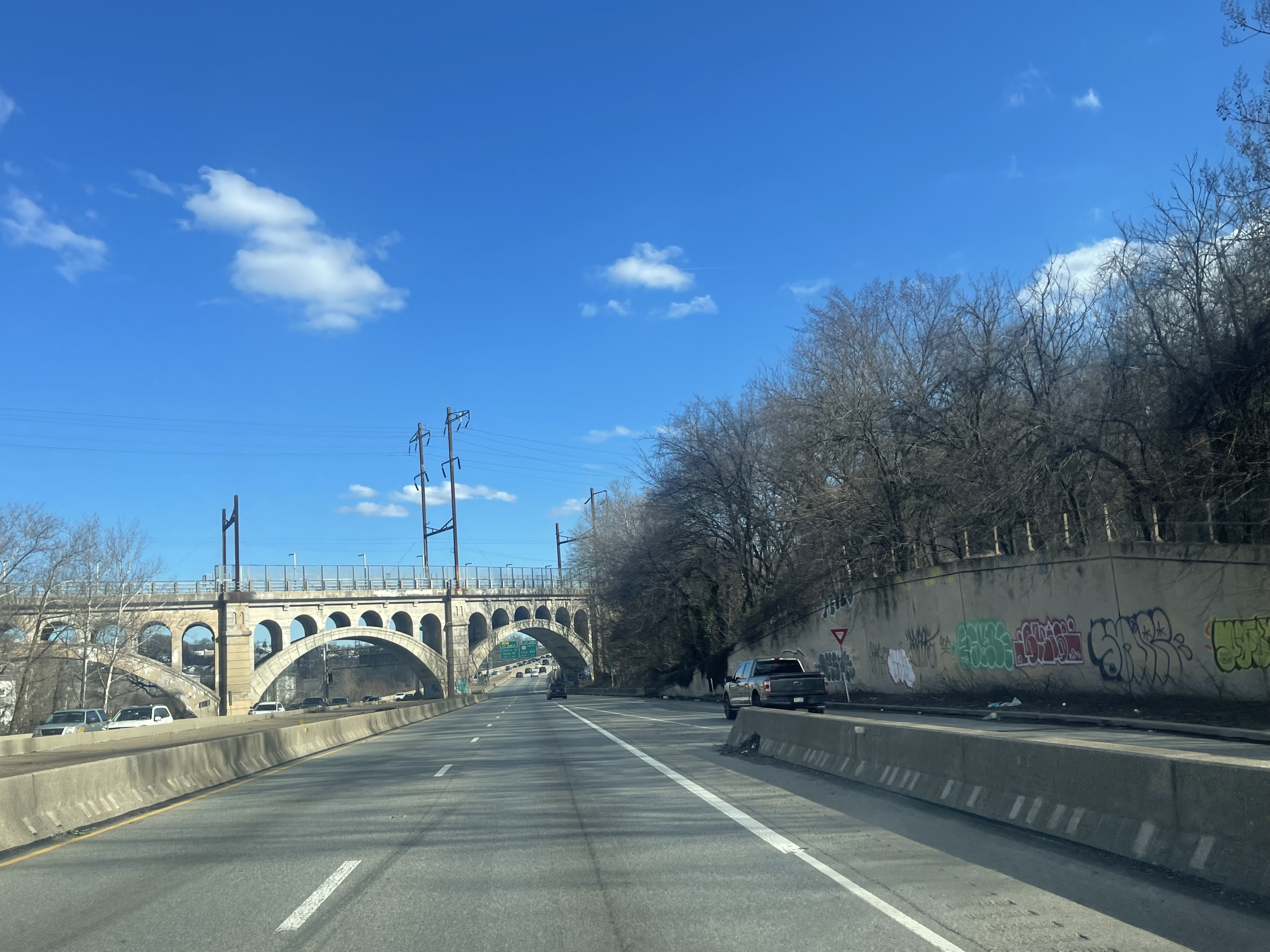
Schuylkill Expressway eastbound at the Manayunk Bridge

Past the I-476 interchange, the Schuylkill Expressway heads east and comes to a westbound exit and eastbound entrance providing access to PA 23 and Conshohocken, passing near residential and commercial development. The freeway passes over PA 23 and leaves West Conshohocken for Lower Merion Township, where it heads through wooded areas and runs on top of a cliff, with Norfolk Southern Railway's Harrisburg Line and the Schuylkill River parallel to the north below the cliff and another cliff rising above the highway to the south. East of Conshohocken at about mile marker 331, it curves sharply southeast in a 90-degree turn locally known as the "Conshohocken Curve" or "Conshy Curve", which has a history of traffic congestion and dangerous conditions. I-76 continues southeast through wooded areas, with the railroad tracks and the river parallel to the northeast. Farther southeast, the Schuylkill Expressway crosses Mill Creek and comes to a westbound exit and eastbound entrance with Hollow Road that provides access to the community of Gladwyne. The freeway passes over the Flat Rock Tunnel carrying Norfolk Southern Railway's Harrisburg Line and continues to the southeast with the Schuylkill River to the northeast and the railroad tracks to the southwest. I-76 comes to a diamond interchange with Belmont Avenue and Green Lane, with Belmont Avenue heading south through the community of Bala Cynwyd in Lower Merion Township, and Green Lane crossing the river into the neighborhood of Manayunk in Philadelphia. Following this interchange, the freeway passes under the Manayunk Bridge that carries an extension of the Cynwyd Heritage Trail across the Schuylkill River. The Schuylkill Expressway passes over Norfolk Southern Railway's Harrisburg Line and runs southeast between the West Laurel Hill Cemetery to the southwest and an industrial area to the northeast that is sandwiched between the railroad tracks and the river. I-76 comes to an interchange with City Avenue on the border of Lower Merion Township and Philadelphia in Philadelphia County; City Avenue heads southwest as US 1 and northeast across the Schuylkill River on the City Avenue Bridges to an interchange with Ridge Avenue, Lincoln Drive, and Kelly Drive.

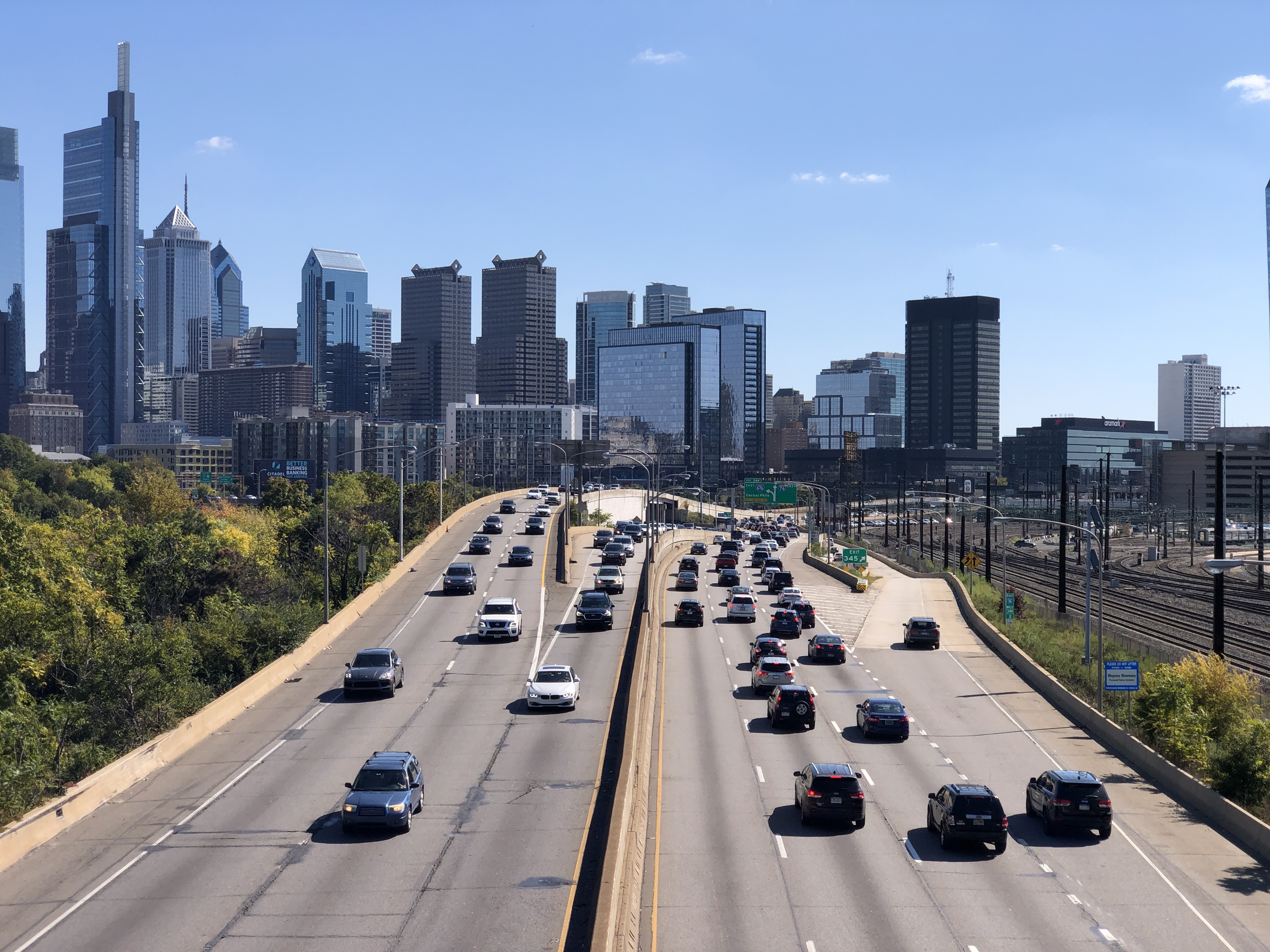
I-76 (Schuylkill Expressway) eastbound at I-676/US 30 (Vine Street Expressway) in Center City, Pennsylvania

Past the City Avenue interchange, I-76 enters Philadelphia and becomes concurrent with US 1, with the Schuylkill Expressway widening from four lanes to eight lanes and running between the West Falls Yard on Norfolk Southern Railway's Harrisburg Line and the river to the north and wooded areas of Fairmount Park to the south. US 1 splits from I-76 by heading northeast on the Roosevelt Expressway, while I-76 continues south on the Schuylkill Expressway, heading through Fairmount Park and running parallel to CSX Transportation's Trenton Subdivision railroad line, Martin Luther King Jr. Drive, the Schuylkill River Trail, and the Schuylkill River to the east. The freeway curves to the southwest, with CSX Transportation's Trenton Subdivision heading east away from the road and CSX Transportation's Harrisburg Subdivision railroad line beginning to run parallel. I-76 comes to a diamond interchange with Montgomery Drive that provides access to Fairmount Park and serves the Mann Center for the Performing Arts. Following this, the Schuylkill Expressway narrows to six lanes and turns to the southeast, running through more of the park with the railroad tracks, Martin Luther King Jr. Drive, the Schuylkill River Trail, and the Schuylkill River parallel to the northeast. The freeway passes under CSX Transportation's Harrisburg Subdivision and comes to an interchange with US 13 and US 30 at Girard Avenue. Within this interchange, the highway passes under the Pennsylvania Railroad, Connecting Railway Bridge that carries Amtrak's Northeast Corridor railroad line across the Schuylkill River before heading under the Girard Avenue Bridge that carries US 13 (Girard Avenue) across the river. US 30 becomes concurrent with I-76 on the Schuylkill Expressway at this point and the road heads south, with the Philadelphia Zoo to the west and Martin Luther King Jr. Drive, the Schuylkill River Trail, and the Schuylkill River still parallel to the east. The freeway turns southeast and runs between Amtrak's Northeast Corridor to the southwest and the river drive, trail, and river to the northeast, with Boathouse Row on the opposite bank of the river. The Schuylkill Expressway comes to an eastbound exit and westbound entrance with Spring Garden Street, which heads east across the Schuylkill River toward the Philadelphia Museum of Art. The freeway continues south, heading east of Amtrak's Penn Coach Yard, and comes to an interchange with the western terminus of I-676, which heads east along with US 30 on the Vine Street Expressway into Center City.

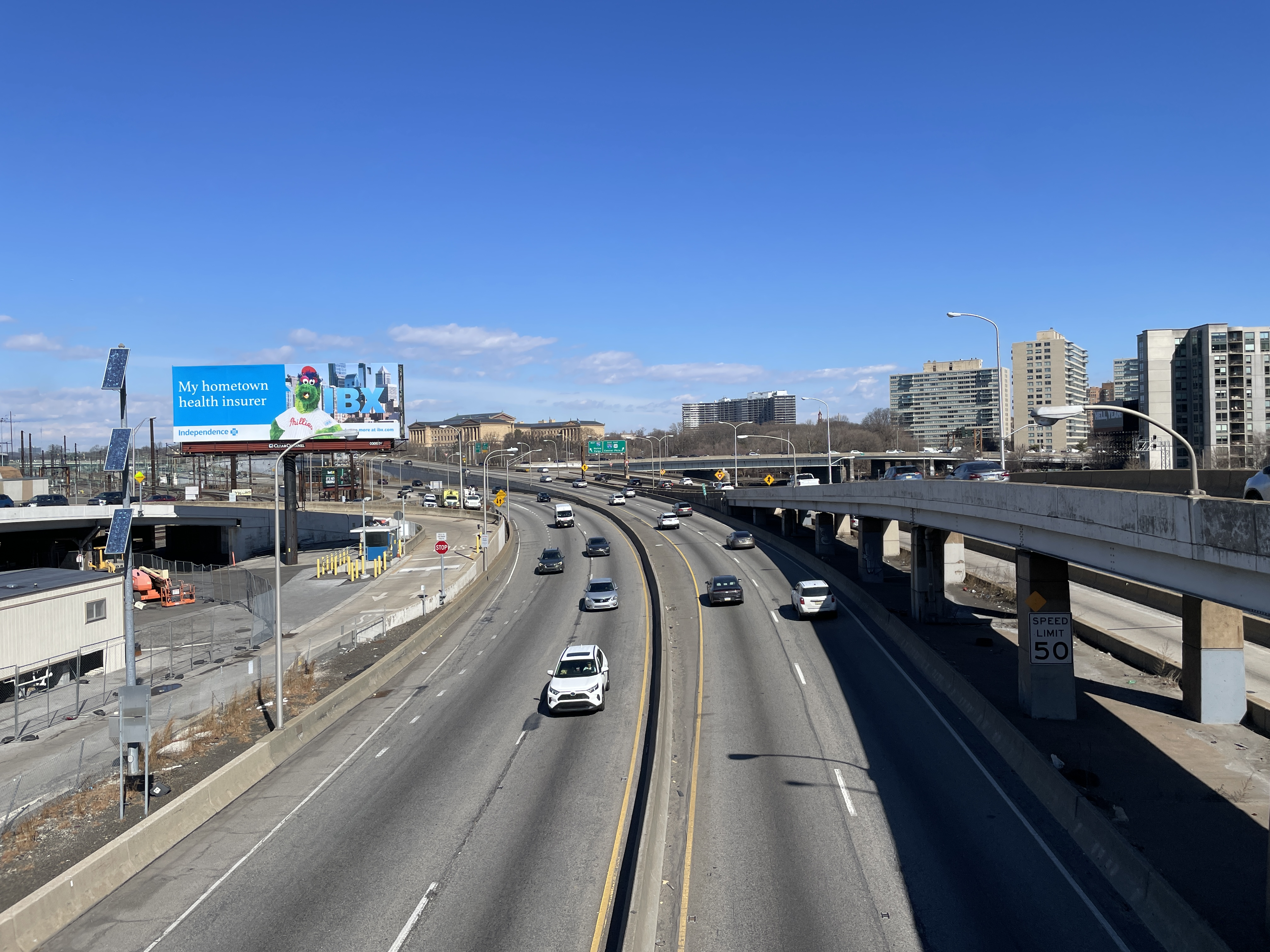
Schuylkill Expressway westbound at I-676/US 30, the Vine Street Expressway, in Center City Philadelphia

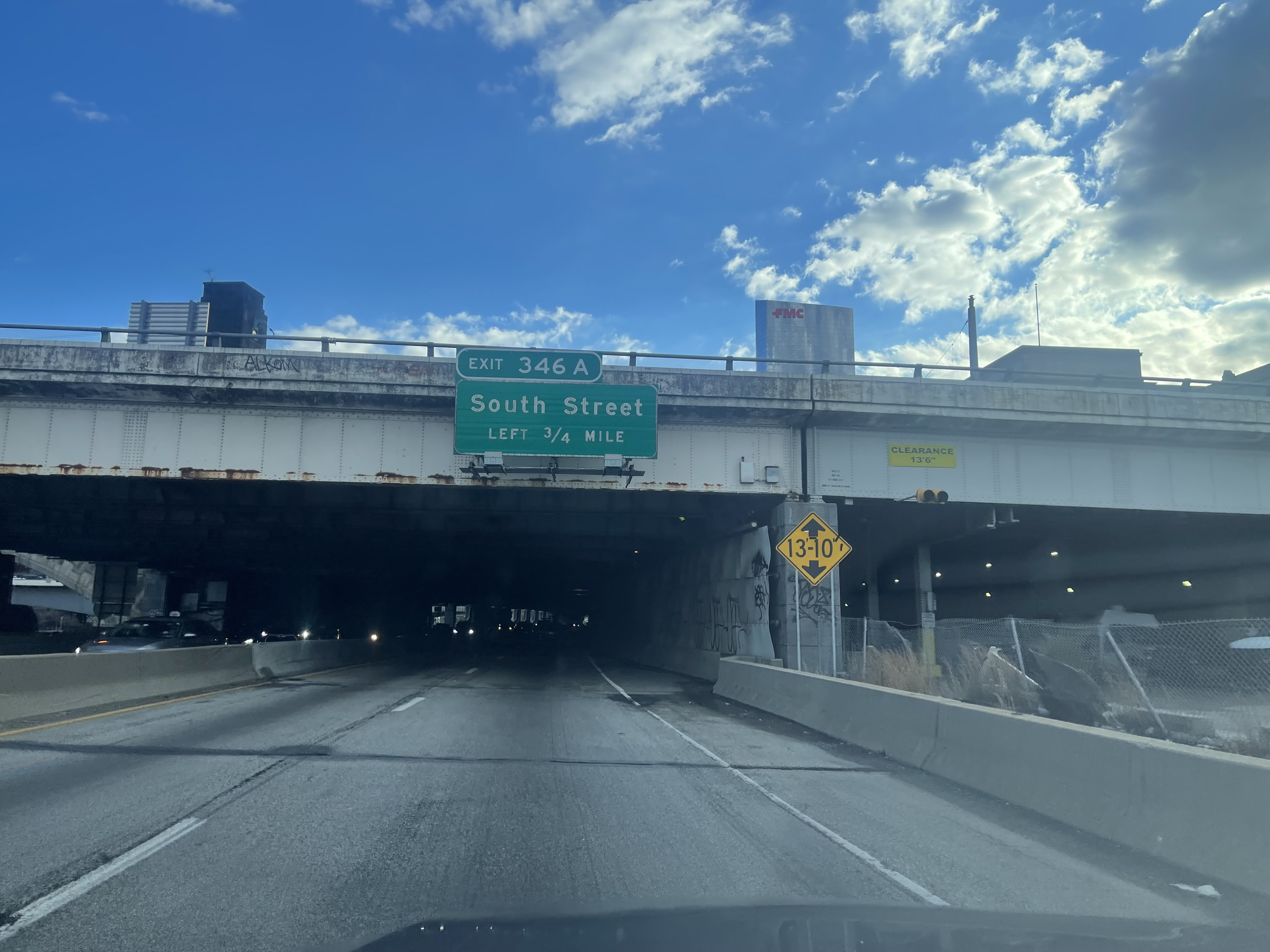
Schuylkill Expressway eastbound entering the 30th Street Station structure in Philadelphia

Following this, I-76 narrows to four lanes and heads south between the Amtrak yard to the west and the Schuylkill River to the east. The road comes to an interchange with Market Street (PA 3) and 30th Street that provides access to 30th Street Station that serves Amtrak, SEPTA Regional Rail, and NJ Transit's Atlantic City Line along with the Cira Centre and University City. At this point, the Schuylkill Expressway dips below street level and runs in a tunnel sandwiched between 30th Street Station and the city's former main Post Office facility to the west and the river to the east, with Schuylkill Avenue running at street level above the tunnel and intersecting John F. Kennedy Boulevard (PA 3 west), Market Street (PA 3 east), Chestnut Street, and Walnut Street. Past the interchange, the freeway returns to ground level and runs southwest between Amtrak's Northeast Corridor to the northwest and the Schuylkill River to the southeast, coming to an interchange with South Street that has left exits and entrances. I-76 continues southwest alongside the river, with athletic fields belonging to the University of Pennsylvania to the northwest of the road. The Schuylkill Expressway passes under the Schuylkill Arsenal Railroad Bridge that carries CSX Transportation's Harrisburg Subdivision across the river before coming to an eastbound exit and westbound entrance providing access to University Avenue.

Following this, the freeway passes over the Schuylkill River on the Schuylkill Expressway Bridge and heads into South Philadelphia. The highway passes over CSX Transportation's Philadelphia Subdivision railroad line and heads south-southwest near urban residential and commercial areas, reaching a westbound exit and eastbound entrance with 34th Street just south of Wharton Street that provides access to Grays Ferry Avenue. I-76 widens to six lanes and continues south near urban development, curving southeast and running between the former Philadelphia Energy Solutions oil refinery and Philadelphia Gas Works to the southwest and urban neighborhoods to the northeast and reaching an eastbound interchange for 28th Street and a westbound interchange with Vare Avenue and Mifflin Street. The Schuylkill Expressway comes to an interchange with Passyunk and Oregon avenues that also has an eastbound exit and westbound entrance to 26th Street that provides access to PA 291 and Philadelphia International Airport. At this point, I-76 narrows to four lanes and turns south, with a CSX Transportation railroad branch parallel to the west and CSX Transportation's Harrisburg Subdivision parallel to the east. This marks the point heading eastbound where the DRPA maintains the road. The freeway makes a sharp turn to the east and passes under the Harrisburg Subdivision, heading near commercial areas and coming to a westbound exit and eastbound entrance with the eastern terminus of PA 291 at Penrose Avenue, providing access to Philadelphia International Airport. The Schuylkill Expressway continues east near urban residential neighborhoods and reaches an interchange with PA 611 (Broad Street). From here, I-76 widens to six lanes and passes north of the South Philadelphia Sports Complex and Live! Casino & Hotel Philadelphia, coming to an interchange with 7th Street and Packer Avenue that has an eastbound exit and entrance and a westbound exit. A short distance later, the freeway comes to a westbound exit and eastbound entrance providing access to I-95 and Front Street. Immediately after, the road has a westbound toll plaza for the Walt Whitman Bridge. The freeway heads onto the seven-lane Walt Whitman Bridge, which carries it over Front Street, I-95, Conrail Shared Assets Operations' Swanson Street Industrial Track, industrial areas in the Port of Philadelphia, Christopher Columbus Boulevard, the Philadelphia Belt Line Railroad, and finally the Delaware River. At this point, the Schuylkill Expressway ends and I-76 continues into New Jersey.

=== New Jersey ===
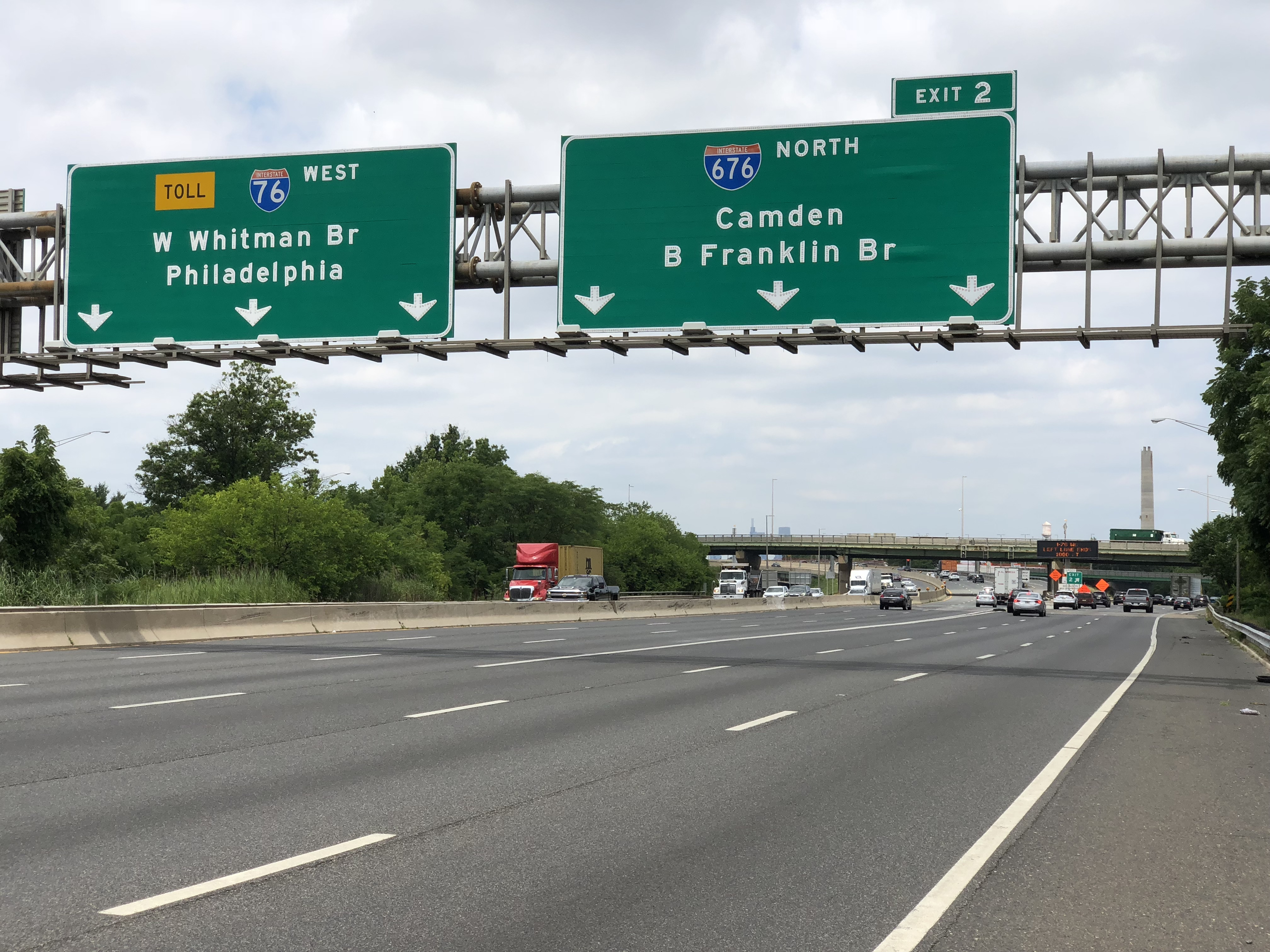
I-76 westbound at the interchange with I-676 in Gloucester City, New Jersey

Just after crossing the Delaware River on the Walt Whitman Bridge, I-76 turns south and becomes the North–South Freeway, which carries I-676 north to Downtown Camden; the unsigned Route 76C connector runs east to US 130 and Route 168. The exit numbers in New Jersey are backward, running from east to west. Though signed eastbound toward Atlantic City, the route ends near Gloucester City in western Camden County at an interchange with I-295.

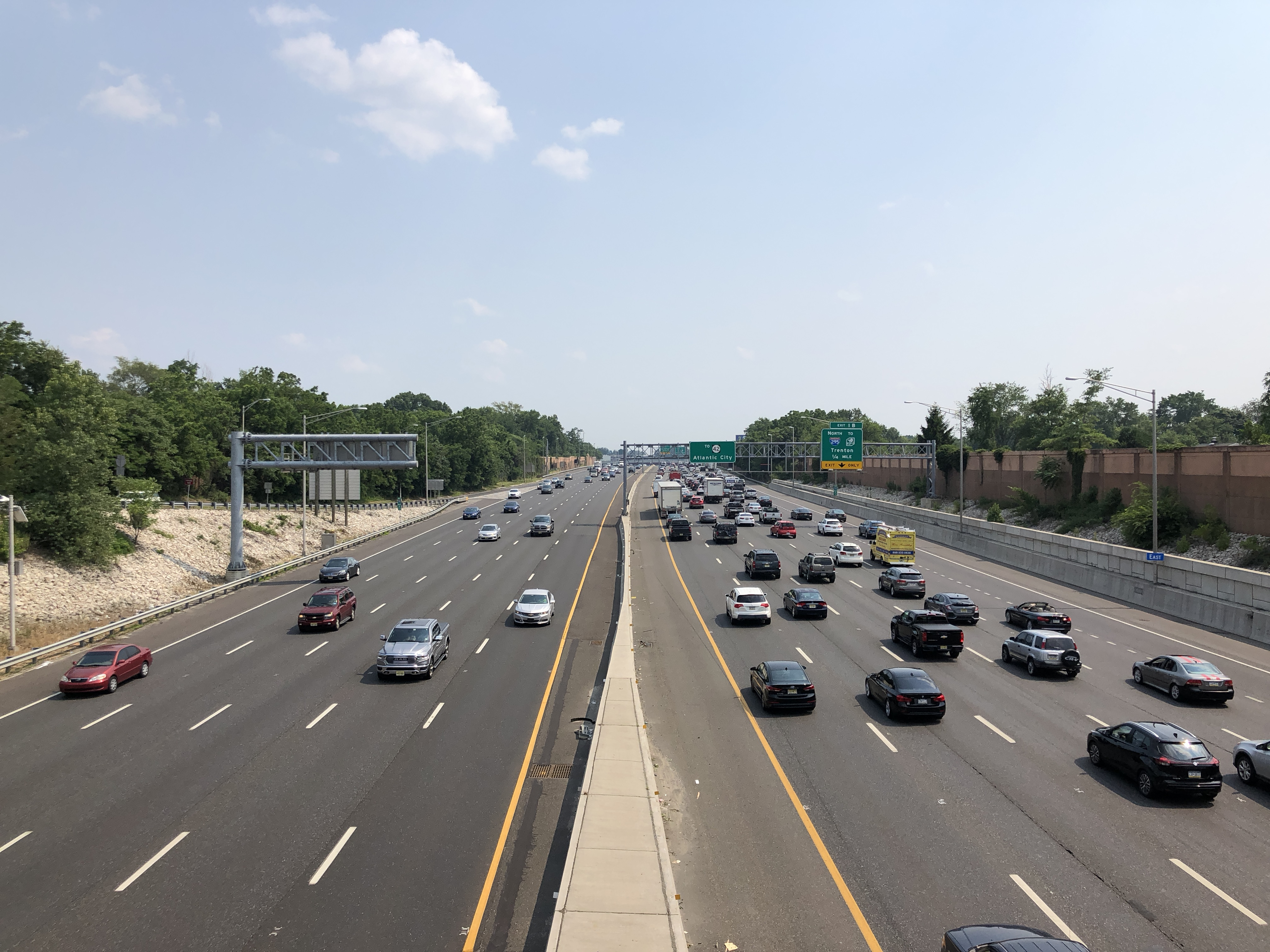
I-76 eastbound in Gloucester City, New Jersey, just west of its terminus at I-295 and Route 42 in Bellmawr

From the exit for I-676 to the end, I-76 originally had local–express lanes in both directions; the barriers in both directions, however, have been removed due to rebuilding of the I-295, I-76, and Route 42 interchange. I-76 ends at an interchange with I-295 on the Mount Ephraim–Bellmawr town line. The road becomes Route 42, continuing south on the North–South Freeway and then feeding into the A.C. Expressway to Atlantic City. While the South Jersey Transportation Authority (which owns the A.C. Expressway) is not against the idea of making the freeway section of Route 42 and the A.C. Expressway an eastern extension of I-76, they feel that making the change without a compelling reason would only add to motorists' confusion in southern New Jersey.

== History ==
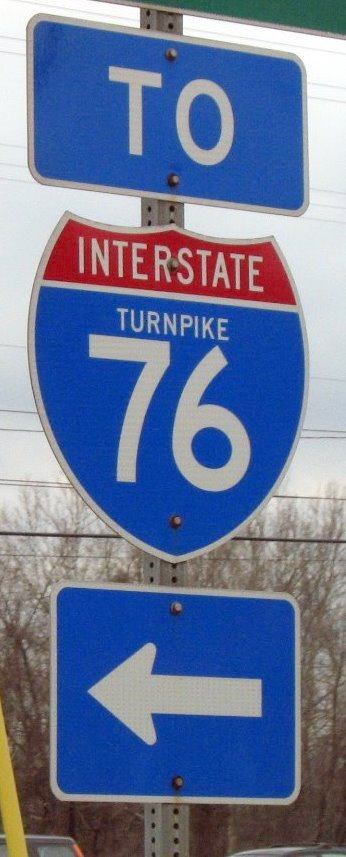
"To Turnpike 76" sign in Pennsylvania

The majority of I-76 along the Pennsylvania Turnpike includes the first long-distance rural freeway in the U.S.; the Ohio Turnpike and Schuylkill Expressway are also pre-Interstate freeways. By 1955, the section of that route from west of Youngstown to Center City, was included in the planned Interstate Highway System, as was present I-76 from west of Youngstown to Akron. (Some early plans called for a new freeway along SR 14 to the Pennsylvania state line; it is unclear when the proposed route was shifted to the turnpikes.)

In 1957, the route from Cleveland east to Harrisburg, running roughly along the SR 14 corridor in Ohio and the turnpike in Pennsylvania, was labeled I-80, and the rest of the route from Harrisburg to Philadelphia was assigned I-80S. (I-80N would have run from Harrisburg to New York City.) I-78 was assigned to a route from Norwalk, paralleling SR 18 through Akron to Youngstown and turning south there to end at the planned I-80.

The 1957 numbering, however, was drawn on a map from 1947, which did not include several changes that had been approved, specifically the Keystone Shortway across Pennsylvania. (The route in that corridor ran further north, along US 6, and was numbered I-84.) Thus, the final numbering, approved in 1958, assigned I-80 to the Norwalk–Youngstown route to reach the Keystone Shortway. The former alignment through Cleveland became I-80N; the turnpike was still not assigned a number from near Elyria (where I-80N and I-90 would split from it) to west of Youngstown. The route from west of Youngstown to Philadelphia was assigned I-80S, and extended east to I-295 in New Jersey when auxiliary Interstates were assigned in 1959. (The planned I-80N in Pennsylvania became I-78.) Initial spurs of I-80S were I-180 (now I-176), I-280 (now I-276), I-480 (now I-476), and I-680 (now I-676, though it swapped with I-76 in 1972).

Current and once-planned Interstates near Cleveland, Ohio; I-80 would have run via Akron, using what is now I-76 east of Akron.

I-80 was realigned in Ohio by 1962, largely taking over former I-80N, which ran through Cleveland, joining the turnpike southwest of Cleveland. However, while I-80N was planned to split from I-80 near Kent and run northwest to Cleveland along SR 14, the new alignment of I-80 used the turnpike between the crossing west of Youngstown and the crossing with SR 14 at Streetsboro. The former I-80 from near Youngstown west to Akron became part of I-80S, as did a new alignment (already built as US 224) from Akron west to I-71 east of Lodi; the rest of proposed I-80 west to near Norwalk (which would have crossed I-71 near Medina) was removed from the Interstate Highway System. I-80 was moved to the turnpike between Streetsboro and southwest of Cleveland c. 1971; the old route became I-480.

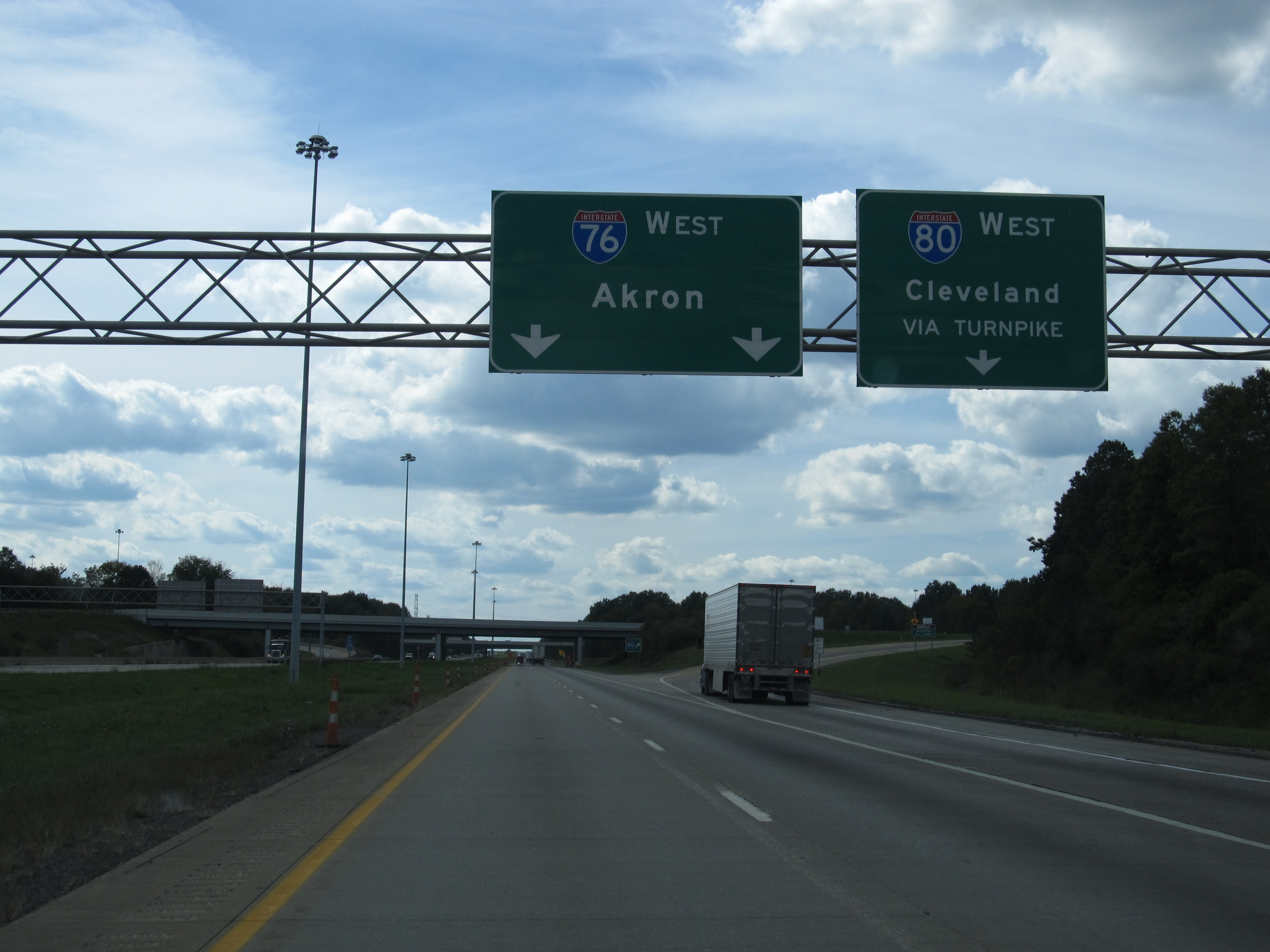
Junction of I-80 and I-76 near Youngstown, Ohio

On April 16, 1963, due in part to the extension of I-79 south from Greater Pittsburgh, Pennsylvania proposed a partial renumbering. A new number, tentatively designated I-76, would run from Downtown Pittsburgh east on what was then I-70 (I-70S bypassed Pittsburgh to the south on what is now I-70) to the Pennsylvania Turnpike at Monroeville, and then east along the remainder of I-80S to I-295. I-80S would remain on the section of turnpikes from west of Youngstown to Monroeville. This was approved February 26, 1964, and included the renumbering of all I-X80 spurs to I-X76.

On June 29, 1970, a renumbering was approved in the Pittsburgh area, with the main effect being rerouting I-79 to bypass Pittsburgh to the west on the former I-279. I-279 was moved to the former I-79 north of downtown, and the former I-79 from downtown southwest to new I-79 became a western extension of I-76. (It was then that I-876 was designated for former I-479.) A realignment and extension of I-76 into Ohio, taking over the rest of I-80S to I-71 east of Lodi, was approved January 11, 1972. The former I-76 from Monroeville west into Downtown Pittsburgh became I-376, and I-279 was extended southwest from downtown along former I-76 to I-79. (I-876 was renumbered to I-579 then.) Signs in Ohio were changed September 1, 1972; the old I-80S signs remained for about a year.

=== Schuylkill Expressway ===
Pennsylvania Route 43
- Location: King of Prussia–Philadelphia
- Length: 27.5 mi (44.3 km)
- Existed: 1951–1964

Plans for a limited-access highway along the west bank of the Schuylkill River originated in 1932, as part of a proposed cars-only parkway system for the Philadelphia area similar to the contemporary system being built in New York City. The "Valley Forge Parkway" was to have run from Fairmount Park to Valley Forge State Park (now Valley Forge National Historical Park) with plans for a later extension to Reading via Pottstown. However, planning for the proposed parkway system stalled and the plan was eventually abandoned. Planning for today's Schukill expressway began in 1947, when the city of Philadelphia approved plans to develop a highway connecting Philadelphia with the terminus of the planned Philadelphia Extension of the Pennsylvania Turnpike near Valley Forge. The highway was designed by engineers Michael Rapuano, who had previously aided in the design of the Garden State Parkway, and Bill Allen of Gannett Fleming. The new expressway largely followed the earlier planned parkway route from Valley Forge to Fairmount Park, while also extending into southern Philadelphia and across the Delaware River into New Jersey. Two alternatives were proposed south of University City: one routing would continue along the west bank of the river into Southwest Philadelphia to its confluence near Philadelphia International Airport, where it would tunnel underneath the Delaware to Paulsboro, New Jersey; the other would cross the Schuylkill south of University City and bisect South Philadelphia, crossing the Delaware River into Gloucester City, New Jersey. Planned expansions of the airport in the path of the former proposal led to adoption of the routing through South Philadelphia. Construction of the road began in 1949. The road was completed in stages, with a short segment near King of Prussia opening in 1951 along with the turnpike's Philadelphia Extension, with the section from King of Prussia to Conshohocken opening a year later. The section between Conshohocken and City Avenue opened in 1954. The Walt Whitman Bridge opened in 1957. The expressway was completed through Fairmount Park in 1959, and, in 1960, the entire expressway was complete with the opening of the segment through University City.

The Schuylkill Expressway was initially designated as PA 43 and was cosigned with I-80S between King of Prussia and Center City and I-680 between Center City and the Walt Whitman Bridge when the Interstate Highway System was designated in 1956. Prior to the roadways being signed as Interstates, I-395 was to be designated along the Schuylkill Expressway from the Vine Street Expressway to the Walt Whitman Bridge; however, I-680 was preferred to be the final designation for this route. On April 16, 1963, Pennsylvania wanted to renumber its Interstate numbers. Part of this was the renumbering from I-80S into I-76, and all of its auxiliary routes into I-x76. The Federal Highway Administration approved the request on February 26, 1964. As a result, I-80S became I-76 and I-680 became I-676. In addition to this renumbering, the PA 43 designation was removed from the Schuylkill Expressway.

Immediately after its completion, operational studies performed on the Schuylkill Expressway found that the route would be unable to cope with the area's growing traffic demands, due to the many substandard design elements and compromises incorporated to cope with the rugged, difficult routing of the road. In 1962, plans were announced for a parallel expressway along the east bank of the Schuylkill River known as the Manayunk Expressway; however, these plans were quickly withdrawn due to substantial opposition. An alternative plan was then introduced to widen the entire highway to eight lanes in time for the US Bicentennial in 1976; however, these plans were also shelved due to local disapproval. A scaled-down widening project was successfully undertaken from 1969 to 1972 to widen a short section of the road to six lanes through Fairmount Park.

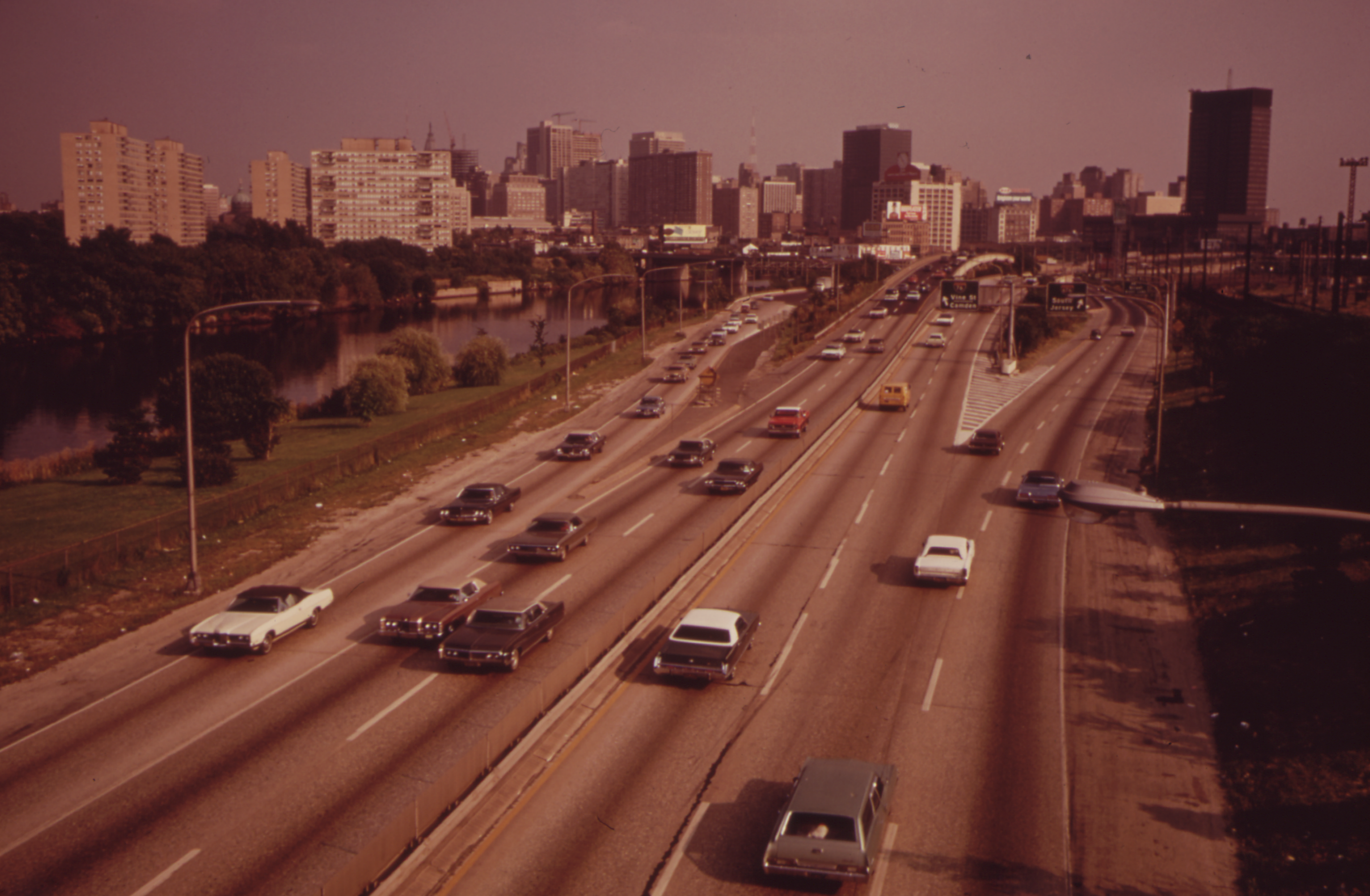
The split of the Schuylkill Expressway and Vine Street Expressway in 1973

On August 29, 1972, a swap of I-76 and I-676 in Philadelphia and Camden was approved. I-76 had been routed along the Vine Street Expressway and Ben Franklin Bridge (now I-676) through Center City, while I-676 used the Schuylkill Expressway and Walt Whitman Bridge to bypass downtown to the south. The switch was made because of delays in building the Vine Street Expressway, better interchange geometry at the splits, and that the Ben Franklin Bridge ends in city streets, rather than in expressway grade. The renumbering of a Philadelphia Interstate to I-76 in the years leading up to the Bicentennial Celebration of the 1776 signing in Philadelphia of the Declaration of Independence gives rise to the question of the highway number being an intentional tribute to the spirit of 1776. U.S. Department of Transportation research into federal documentation of the I-76 renumbering found no evidence of this being intentional.

From 1985 to 1989, part of the Schuylkill Expressway was reconstructed with new pavement.

In the almost seven decades since its opening, congestion on the Schuylkill Expressway has steadily increased. Plans to expand the expressway to eight lanes by building an upper deck, including high-occupancy toll lanes, were advocated by former Pennsylvania House Speaker John Perzel, but never came to fruition. PennDOT completed a scaled back version of a $23.7-million (equivalent to $32.9 million in 2023) project to add 29 webcams on the Schuylkill Expressway between the Conshohocken Curve and Passyunk Avenue in 2008.

On the afternoon of June 8, 2011, a section of the Schuylkill Expressway near Grays Ferry Avenue buckled from temperatures around 100 °F (38 °C), causing lane closures. The closed lane of the road was later reopened temporarily until full repairs could be made.

Exactly three months later, on September 8, 2011, heavy rains caused by Tropical Storm Lee caused a rockslide in the vicinity of the Conshohocken Curve, flooding near Belmont Avenue, and a mudslide by Girard Avenue. For hours, motorists were stuck at various locations in both directions between I-476 and Girard Avenue until the mess could be cleaned up.

In May 2011, the new westbound entrance at South Gulph and South Henderson roads in King of Prussia was completed and in November the westbound exit was completed. The new interchange cost $10.5 million (equivalent to $14 million in 2023) and used money from the American Recovery and Reinvestment Act of 2009.

PennDOT has installed variable speed limit signs along the Schuylkill Expressway, where the speed limit can be lowered due to factors such as inclement weather or accidents as well as to manage traffic flow. The variable speed limit signs were activated on April 8, 2021. The project incorporates variable-message signs to alert motorists to traffic congestion ahead. It could also coordinate with SEPTA to provide motorists with real-time mass transit information to give commuters an option to exit the highway and use public transportation to finish their trip at some point. There are also future plans to coordinate traffic signals on roads leading to the Schuylkill Expressway and install ramp meters on entrance ramps to the highway. PennDOT is in the preliminary stages of studying plans to use the right shoulder of the Schuylkill Expressway as a travel lane in certain sections during peak periods; construction of these lanes is not expected to begin until sometime in the mid-2020s.

In 2022, one mile of the highway in Lower Merion Township was designated as the "Firefighter Thomas Royds Memorial Highway" in honor of Thomas Royds, a firefighter who was killed by a drunk driver while responding to an accident on the highway in 2021.

The rugged terrain, limited riverfront space covered by the route and narrow spans of bridges passing over the highway have largely stymied attempts to upgrade or widen the Schuylkill Expressway. With the road being highly over capacity, it has become notorious for its chronic congestion. An average of 163,000 vehicles use the road daily in Philadelphia County, and an average of 109,000 use the highway in Montgomery County, making it the busiest road in Pennsylvania. Its narrow lane and left shoulder configuration, left lane entrances and exits (nicknamed "merge or die"), common construction activity, and generally congested conditions have led to many accidents, critical injuries, and fatalities, leading to the highway's humorous nickname of the "Surekill Expressway" or, in further embellishment, the "Surekill Distressway" or the "Surekill Crawlway".

== Exit list ==
Exit numbers on the turnpike portion in Ohio follow the mileage markers for the Ohio Turnpike.

State	County	Location	mi	km	Old exit	New exit	Destinations	Notes
Ohio	Medina	Westfield Township	0.00	0.00			US 224 west – Lodi, Findlay	Continuation west; western end of US 224 concurrency
Ohio	Medina	Westfield Township	0.00	0.00		1	I-71 – Columbus, Cleveland, Cincinnati	Signed as exits 1A (south) and 1B (north) westbound; exit 209A on I-71
Ohio	Medina	Seville	2.32	3.73		2	SR 3 – Medina, Seville	
Ohio	Medina	Wadsworth	7.72	12.42		7	SR 57 – Rittman, Medina	
Ohio	Medina	Wadsworth	9.76	15.71		9	SR 94 – North Royalton, Wadsworth	
Ohio	Medina	Wadsworth	11.71	18.85		11	SR 261 – Norton, Wadsworth	
Ohio	Summit	Norton	13.32	21.44		13	SR 21 – Massillon, Cleveland	Signed as exits 13A (south) and 13B (north)
Ohio	Summit	Norton	14.65	23.58		14	Cleveland–Massillon Road	
Ohio	Summit	Norton	16.19	26.06		16	Barber Road	
Ohio	Summit	Barberton	17.53	28.21		17	State Street to SR 619 (East Avenue / Wooster Road)	Former partial diamond interchange; reconstructed to a full diamond interchange to increase the distance from I-277/Kenmore Leg interchange
Ohio	Summit	Barberton	17.83	28.69		17	SR 619 (East Avenue / Wooster Road) – Barberton	
Ohio	Summit	Akron	18.62	29.97		18	I-277 east / US 224 east – Mogadore	Westbound exit and eastbound entrance; eastern end of US 224 concurrency; exit 1 on I-277
Ohio	Summit	Akron	19.04	30.64		19	Battles Avenue / Kenmore Boulevard	
Ohio	Summit	Akron	20.45	32.91		20	I-77 north – Cleveland	Eastbound exit and westbound entrance; western end of I-77 concurrency; exit number not signed westbound
Ohio	Summit	Akron	20.79	33.46		21A	East Avenue	Westbound exit and eastbound entrance
Ohio	Summit	Akron	21.59	34.75		21B	Lakeshore Boulevard / Bowery Street	Eastbound exit and entrance
Ohio	Summit	Akron	21.73	34.97		21C	SR 59 east – Downtown	Eastbound signage
Ohio	Summit	Akron	21.77	35.04		21C	To SR 59 east / Dart Avenue	Westbound signage
Ohio	Summit	Akron	22.39	36.03		22	Main Street / Broadway Street – Downtown	Was exit 22A before Wolf Ledges/Grant Street exit was removed
Ohio	Summit	Akron	22.79	36.68		22B	Wolf Ledges Parkway / Grant Street	Closed June 14, 2017
Ohio	Summit	Akron	23.57	37.93		23	I-77 south / SR 8 north – Canton, Cuyahoga Falls, Cleveland	Eastern end of I-77 concurrency; signed as exits 23A (north) and 23B (south); Central Interchange
Ohio	Summit	Akron	23.83	38.35		24A	Inman Street / Johnston Street	Former westbound exit only; closed November 7, 2021
Ohio	Summit	Akron	24.34	39.17		24	Arlington Street	Westbound signage; was exit 24B before Inman Street/Johnston Street exit was removed
Ohio	Summit	Akron	24.71	39.77		24	Arlington Street / Kelly Avenue	Eastbound signage
Ohio	Summit	Akron	25.00	40.23		25A	SR 241 (Innovation Way)	Signed as exit 25 westbound
Ohio	Summit	Akron	25.67	41.31		25B	Brittain Road	Eastbound exit and westbound entrance
Ohio	Summit	Akron	26.11	42.02		26	SR 18 (East Market Street)	Access to Mogadore Road (former SR 526)
Ohio	Summit	Springfield Township	27.35	44.02		27	Gilchrist Road, Canton Road to SR 91	
Ohio	Summit	Tallmadge	29.00	46.67		29	SR 532 – Mogadore, Tallmadge	
Ohio	Portage	Brimfield Township	31.31	50.39		31	CR 18 (Tallmadge Road)	
Ohio	Portage	Brimfield Township	33.04	53.17		33	SR 43 – Kent, Hartville	
Ohio	Portage	Rootstown Township	38.53	62.01		38	SR 5 east / SR 44 – Ravenna	Signed as exits 38A (south) and 38B (north) eastbound
Ohio	Portage	Edinburg Township	43.07	69.31		43	SR 14 – Alliance, Ravenna	
Ohio	Portage	Palmyra Township	48.58	78.18		48	SR 225 – Alliance	
Ohio	Mahoning	Milton Township	54.04	86.97		54	SR 534 – Lake Milton, Newton Falls	
Ohio	Mahoning	Jackson Township	57.25	92.13		57	Bailey Road to SR 45 – Warren	
Ohio	Mahoning	Jackson Township	59.85	96.32		219 (EB); 218 (WB)	I-80 / Ohio Turnpike west – Toledo, Youngstown	Western end of Ohio Turnpike concurrency
Ohio	Mahoning	Jackson Township	59.85	96.32			CR 18 (Mahoning Avenue)	Westbound exit and eastbound entrance
Ohio	Mahoning	Beaver Township			16	232	SR 7 – Youngstown	Last eastbound exit before toll
Ohio	Mahoning	Beaver Township			16A	234	I-680 north – Youngstown, Poland	Westbound exit and eastbound entrance
Ohio	Mahoning	Springfield Township			Mahoning Valley Service Plaza (westbound); Glacier Hills Service Plaza (eastbound)			
Ohio	Mahoning	Springfield Township			Eastgate Toll Barrier (westbound only)			
Ohio–Pennsylvania state line			82.12 0.000	132.16 0.000	Ohio Turnpike becomes Pennsylvania Turnpike			
Pennsylvania	Lawrence	North Beaver Township	1.43	2.30	Gateway Toll Gantry (eastbound only; E-ZPass or toll-by-plate)			
Pennsylvania	Beaver	Big Beaver	10.70	17.22	1A	10	I-376 Toll – New Castle, Pittsburgh	Exit 26 on I-376; New Castle Interchange; last westbound exit before toll
Pennsylvania	Beaver	Big Beaver	12.87	20.71	2	13	PA 18 – Ellwood City, Beaver Falls	Beaver Valley Interchange
Pennsylvania	Beaver	Beaver River	13.0– 13.3	20.9– 21.4	Beaver River Bridge			
Pennsylvania	Butler	Cranberry Township	28.47	45.82	3	28	I-79 / US 19 – Pittsburgh, Erie	Exit 77 on I-79; access to Old Economy Village State Historic Site; Cranberry Interchange (formerly known as Perry Highway Interchange); last eastbound exit before toll
Pennsylvania	Allegheny	Marshall Township	33	53	Toll Gantry (E-ZPass or toll-by-plate)			
Pennsylvania	Allegheny	Hampton Township	39.10	62.93	4	39	PA 8 – Pittsburgh, Butler	Butler Valley Interchange
Pennsylvania	Allegheny	Harmar Township	47.73	76.81	5	48	PA 28 – New Kensington, Pittsburgh	Access via Freeport Road; Allegheny Valley Interchange
Pennsylvania	Allegheny	Allegheny River	47.8– 48.2	76.9– 77.6	Allegheny River Bridge			
Pennsylvania	Allegheny	Plum	49.30	79.34	Oakmont Plum Service Plaza (eastbound)			
Pennsylvania	Allegheny	Monroeville	56.44	90.83	6	57	I-376 west / US 22 – Pittsburgh, Monroeville	Eastern terminus and exit 85 on I-376; access to North Shore Destinations; to US 22 Bus.
Pennsylvania	Westmoreland	North Huntingdon Township	67.22	108.18	1; 7	67	US 30 – Irwin, Greensburg, McKeesport	Signed for Greensburg eastbound, McKeesport westbound; Irwin Interchange
Pennsylvania	Westmoreland	New Stanton	75.39	121.33	2; 8	75	I-70 west / US 119 / PA Turnpike 66 north – Greensburg, Wheeling, WV	Western end of I-70 concurrency; access to US 119/PA 66 via SR 3091; access to Washington, PA, Columbus, OH, Connellsville, and Delmont; New Stanton Interchange
Pennsylvania	Westmoreland	Hempfield Township	77.60	124.89	New Stanton Service Plaza (westbound)			
Pennsylvania	Westmoreland	Mount Pleasant Township	80.8	130.0		81	PA 981	Proposed
Pennsylvania	Westmoreland	Donegal Township	90.69	145.95	3; 9	91	PA 31 / PA 711 – Ligonier, Uniontown	Access to PA 711 via PA 31; Donegal Interchange
Pennsylvania	Somerset	Somerset	109.91	176.88	4; 10	110	To US 219 – Somerset, Johnstown	Access via PA 281; access to Flight 93 National Memorial; Somerset Interchange
Pennsylvania	Somerset	Somerset Township	112.30– 112.40	180.73– 180.89	North Somerset Service Plaza (westbound); South Somerset Service Plaza (eastbound)			
Pennsylvania	Somerset	Stonycreek–Allegheny township line	122.7– 123.9	197.5– 199.4	Allegheny Mountain Tunnel			
Pennsylvania	Bedford	Bedford Township	145.50	234.16	5; 11	146	I-99 north / US 220 – Bedford, Altoona	Access via US 220 Bus.; access to Blue Knob State Park, Shawnee State Park, and Cumberland, MD; Bedford Interchange
Pennsylvania	Bedford	Bedford Township	147.30	237.06	North Midway Service Plaza (westbound); South Midway Service Plaza (eastbound)			
Pennsylvania	Bedford	East Providence Township	161.50	259.91	6; 12	161	US 30 to I-70 east – Everett, Baltimore	Everett not signed eastbound; eastern end of I-70 concurrency; Breezewood Interchange
Pennsylvania	Fulton	Taylor Township	172.30	277.29	Sideling Hill Service Plaza (both directions)			
Pennsylvania	Fulton	Dublin Township	179.44	288.78	7; 13	180	US 522 – McConnellsburg, Mount Union	Fort Littleton Interchange
Pennsylvania	Huntingdon–Franklin county line	Dublin–Metal township line	187.3– 188.3	301.4– 303.0	Tuscarora Mountain Tunnel			
Pennsylvania	Franklin	Metal Township	188.59	303.51	8; 14	189	PA 75 – Willow Hill, Fort Loudon	Willow Hill Interchange
Pennsylvania	Franklin	Fannett–Lurgan township line	198.5– 199.4	319.5– 320.9	Kittatinny Mountain Tunnel			
Pennsylvania	Franklin	Lurgan Township	199.5– 200.3	321.1– 322.4	Blue Mountain Tunnel			
Pennsylvania	Franklin	Lurgan Township	201.29	323.94	9; 15	201	PA 997 – Shippensburg, Chambersburg	Blue Mountain Interchange
Pennsylvania	Cumberland	Hopewell Township	202.50	325.89	Blue Mountain Service Plaza (westbound)			
Pennsylvania	Cumberland	West Pennsboro Township	219.10	352.61	Cumberland Valley Service Plaza (eastbound)			
Pennsylvania	Cumberland	Middlesex Township	226.54	364.58	10/11; 16	226	I-81 / US 11 – Carlisle, Harrisburg, Chambersburg	Signed for Harrisburg eastbound, Chambersburg westbound; access to I-81 via US 11 access to US Army War College and US Army Heritage Center; Carlisle Interchange
Pennsylvania	Cumberland	Upper Allen Township	236.22	380.16	17	236	US 15 – Gettysburg, Harrisburg	Access to Harrisburg State Capital; Gettysburg Pike Interchange
Pennsylvania	York	Fairview Township	241.87	389.25	18	242	I-83 – York, Baltimore, Harrisburg	Exit 39B on I-83; access to Harrisburg State Capital; Harrisburg West Interchange
Pennsylvania	Susquehanna River		246.5– 247.3	396.7– 398.0	Susquehanna River Bridge			
Pennsylvania	Dauphin	Lower Swatara Township	247.38	398.12	19	247	I-283 north to PA 283 east – Harrisburg, Hershey	Southern terminus of I-283; access to Harrisburg International Airport and Harrisburg State Capital; Harrisburg East Interchange
Pennsylvania	Dauphin	Lower Swatara Township	249.70	401.85	Highspire Service Plaza (eastbound)			
Pennsylvania	Dauphin	Londonderry Township	251	404		251	PA 283	Proposed; estimated for completion by 2031
Pennsylvania	Dauphin–Lebanon county line	Conewago–South Londonderry township line	258.80	416.50	Lawn Service Plaza (westbound)			
Pennsylvania	Lancaster	Rapho Township	266.45	428.81	20	266	PA 72 – Lebanon, Manheim, Lancaster	Signed for Manheim eastbound, Lancaster westbound; access to Cornwall Iron Furnace State Historic Site and Hershey; Lebanon–Lancaster Interchange
Pennsylvania	Lancaster	East Cocalico Township	286.09	460.42	21	286	US 222 / PA 272 – Reading, Ephrata, Lancaster	Signed for Ephrata eastbound, Lancaster westbound; access via SR 1040 (Colonel Howard Boulevard); access to Ephrata Cloister and Landis Valley Museum; Reading Interchange
Pennsylvania	Lancaster	Brecknock Township	289.90	466.55	Bowmansville Service Plaza (eastbound)			
Pennsylvania	Lancaster	Brecknock Township	291	468	Toll Gantry (E-ZPass or toll-by-plate)			
Pennsylvania	Berks	Caernarvon Township	298.33	480.12	22	298	I-176 north / PA 10 to PA 23 – Morgantown, Reading	Southern terminus of I-176; access to Daniel Boone Homestead State Historical Site; Morgantown Interchange
Pennsylvania	Chester	Wallace Township	304.80	490.53	Peter J. Camiel Service Plaza (westbound)			
Pennsylvania	Chester	Upper Uwchlan Township	310	500	Toll Gantry (E-ZPass or toll-by-plate)			
Pennsylvania	Chester	Uwchlan Township	311.93	502.00	23	312	PA 100 – Pottstown, West Chester	Access to Hopewell Furnace National Historic Site; Downingtown Interchange
Pennsylvania	Chester	Uwchlan Township	312	502	Toll Gantry (E-ZPass or toll-by-plate)			
Pennsylvania	Chester	Charlestown–East Whiteland– Tredyffrin township tripoint	319.33	513.91	–	320	PA 29 – Phoenixville, Malvern	
Pennsylvania	Chester	Tredyffrin Township	322	518	Toll Gantry (E-ZPass or toll-by-plate)			
Pennsylvania	Chester	Tredyffrin Township	324.50	522.23	Valley Forge Service Plaza (eastbound)			
Pennsylvania	Montgomery	Upper Merion Township	326.62– 327.28	525.64– 526.71	24	326	I-276 Toll east / Penna Turnpike east to I-95 Toll north / N.J. Turnpike / I-476 – New York City, Allentown	I-476/Allentown signed westbound, NJTP signed eastbound; eastern end of Penna Turnpike concurrency; western terminus of I-276; Valley Forge Interchange
Pennsylvania	Montgomery	Upper Merion Township	327.55– 327.70	527.14– 527.38	25	327	North Gulph Road / Village Drive – Valley Forge (EB) Mall Boulevard (WB)	Access to Valley Forge Casino Resort; last westbound exit before toll
Pennsylvania	Montgomery	Upper Merion Township	327.98	527.83	26	328	US 202 / US 422 west / Swedesford Road – West Chester, King of Prussia, Pottstown	Signed as exits 328A (US 202 south/US 422 west/Swedesford Road) and 328B (US 202 north); access to Valley Forge National Historical Park
Pennsylvania	Montgomery	Upper Merion Township			–	329	King of Prussia, Norristown	Westbound exit and entrance; access via Henderson Road
Pennsylvania	Montgomery	Upper Merion Township	330.30	531.57	27	330	PA 320 – Gulph Mills	No westbound entrance; access to Villanova University and Rosemont College
Pennsylvania	Montgomery	Lower Merion Township–West Conshohocken line			28	331	I-476 / PA 23 – Chester, Plymouth Meeting, Conshohocken	Signed as exits 331A (south) and 331B (north); no westbound access to PA 23/Conshohocken; access to PA 23 via Matsonford Road; exit 16 on I-476
Pennsylvania	Montgomery	West Conshohocken	332.61	535.28	29	332	PA 23 – Conshohocken	Westbound exit and eastbound entrance; access via Matsonford Road; originally planned western terminus of the proposed Ten Mile Loop
Pennsylvania	Montgomery	Lower Merion Township	337.39	542.98	30	337	Gladwyne	Westbound exit and eastbound entrance; access via Hollow Road
Pennsylvania	Montgomery	Lower Merion Township	338.73	545.13	31	338	Green Lane / Belmont Avenue	Access to Manayunk and Roxborough
Pennsylvania	Montgomery–Philadelphia county line	Lower Merion Township–Philadelphia line	340.20	547.50	33	339	US 1 south (City Avenue)	Western end of US 1 concurrency; access to St. Joseph's University Hawk Hill Campus
Pennsylvania	Philadelphia	Philadelphia	340.34	547.72	32	340A	Lincoln Drive / Kelly Drive	Access to Germantown and Wissahickon Park
Pennsylvania	Philadelphia	Philadelphia	340.92	548.66	34	340B	US 1 north to Roosevelt Boulevard	Eastern end of US 1 concurrency; access to Northeast Philadelphia
Pennsylvania	Philadelphia	Philadelphia	342.55	551.28	35	341	Montgomery Drive / Martin Luther King Jr. Drive	No trucks or buses; access to West Fairmount Park and Mann Music Center
Pennsylvania	Philadelphia	Philadelphia	343.73	553.18	36	342	US 13 / US 30 west (Girard Avenue) – Philadelphia Zoo	Western end of US 30 concurrency; access to East Fairmount Park
Pennsylvania	Philadelphia	Philadelphia	344.57	554.53	37	343	Spring Garden Street / Haverford Avenue	Eastbound exit and westbound entrance
Pennsylvania	Philadelphia	Philadelphia	345.04	555.29	38	344	I-676 east / US 30 east – Central Philadelphia	Eastern end of US 30 concurrency; western terminus of I-676; former routing of I-76
Pennsylvania	Philadelphia	Philadelphia	345.36	555.80	39	345	30th Street / Market Street – 30th Street Station	Market Street not signed westbound; access to Drexel University
Pennsylvania	Philadelphia	Philadelphia	346.04	556.90	40	346A	South Street	Left exit; access to University of Pennsylvania
Pennsylvania	Philadelphia	Philadelphia	346.80	558.12	41	346B	Grays Ferry Avenue / University Avenue	Grays Ferry Avenue not signed westbound; originally planned eastern terminus of the proposed Five Mile Loop
Pennsylvania	Philadelphia	Philadelphia	347.41	559.10	42	346C	28th Street (EB) Vare Avenue / Mifflin Street (WB)	
Pennsylvania	Philadelphia	Philadelphia	348.01	560.07	43A	347A	To I-95 south / PA 291 (Penrose Avenue) – International Airport	Eastbound exit and westbound entrance; access via 26th Street
Pennsylvania	Philadelphia	Philadelphia	348.01	560.07	43B	347B (EB); 347 (WB)	Passyunk Avenue / Oregon Avenue	Oregon Avenue not signed westbound
Pennsylvania	Philadelphia	Philadelphia	349.14	561.89	44	348	PA 291 west (Penrose Avenue)	Westbound exit and eastbound entrance; eastern terminus of PA 291
Pennsylvania	Philadelphia	Philadelphia	349.65	562.71	45	349	PA 611 (Broad Street) – Sports Complex	
Pennsylvania	Philadelphia	Philadelphia	350.14	563.50	46	350	Packer Avenue to I-95 (EB) Seventh Street to Packer Avenue (WB)	No westbound entrance
Pennsylvania	Philadelphia	Philadelphia	350.53	564.12	47	351	I-95 / Front Street – Trenton, Chester, Sports Complex	Westbound exit and eastbound entrance; exit 19 on I-95; access to Philadelphia International Airport
Delaware River			351.98 3.08	566.46 4.96	Walt Whitman Bridge (westbound toll)			
New Jersey	Camden	Camden	2.30– 2.21	3.70– 3.56		354 (EB); 2 (WB)	I-676 north / CR 630 to US 130 north / Route 168 south – Camden, Gloucester, Benjamin Franklin Bridge	No westbound access to US 130/Route 168; access to US 130/Route 168 via Route 76C; CR 630 not signed; last westbound exit before toll
New Jersey	Camden	Gloucester City	1.15– 0.76	1.85– 1.22		1D-C	US 130 – Collingswood, Brooklawn, Westville	No eastbound access to US 130 north; signed as exits 1D (north) and 1C (south)
New Jersey	Camden	Bellmawr	0.00	0.00		1B-A	I-295 to N.J. Turnpike – Trenton, Delaware Memorial Bridge	Signed as exits 1B (north) and 1A (south); no westbound access to I-295 south; exits 26-27 on I-295
New Jersey	Camden	Bellmawr	0.00	0.00		–	Route 42 south to A.C. Expressway east – Atlantic City	Continuation south
1.000 mi = 1.609 km; 1.000 km = 0.621 mi: Concurrency terminus; Closed/former; Incomplete access; Tolled; Route transition

== Auxiliary routes ==
- I-176 runs north from the Pennsylvania Turnpike near Morgantown, to US 422 outside of Reading.
- I-276 carries the Pennsylvania Turnpike mainline from where I-76 leaves the turnpike in King of Prussia to an interchange with I-95 in Bristol Township. It originally continued east to meet the New Jersey Turnpike's Pearl Harbor Memorial Extension at the Delaware River–Turnpike Toll Bridge prior to the rerouting of I-95 in 2018.
- I-376 runs west from the Pennsylvania Turnpike in Monroeville, through Pittsburgh, becomes a toll road northwest of Pittsburgh International Airport, intersects the turnpike again in New Castle, and terminates at I-80 in Sharon.
- I-476 begins at I-95 near Chester and heads north, crossing I-76 near Conshohocken, and the Pennsylvania Turnpike mainline (I-276) near Plymouth Meeting. From there it continues north to I-81 in Clarks Summit on the north side of Scranton as the turnpike's Northeast Extension. At 132.1 miles (212.6 km) in length, it is the longest auxiliary Interstate in the United States.
- PA 576 is a planned, partially completed, southern bypass of Pittsburgh. It presently runs from I-376 near Pittsburgh International Airport to I-79 near Hendersonville, Pennsylvania. It is intended to eventually continue eastward to the Mon-Fayette Expressway. It does not directly connect to I-76.
- I-676 is a loop through Center City, Philadelphia, and Camden, New Jersey, crossing the Benjamin Franklin Bridge. It runs through several traffic signals in Center City, in violation of Interstate Highway standards.
- I-876 was the number for present I-579 through Pittsburgh in the early 1970s.
- Interstate 76 Alternate (I-76 Alt.) is an incident bypass route located in Summit County, Ohio, that runs along SR 21 and I-77 between Norton, Ohio, and Akron, Ohio.
- Interstate 76 Connector (I-76 Conn.) is an unsigned business route located in Camden, New Jersey, that runs from the I-76 and I-676 interchange to Route 168. It interchanges US 130 before reaching its eastern terminus.
