= Interstate 695 (Pennsylvania) =

Interstate 695
- I-695 corridor highlighted in red

Route information
- Auxiliary route of I-95
- Maintained by PennDOT
- Length: 9.7 mi (15.6 km)
- Existed: 1964–1977 (never built)
- NHS: Entire route

Major junctions
- West end: I-95 near Philadelphia International Airport
- US 1 near Yeadon; US 1 in West Philadelphia; I-76 in Philadelphia
- East end: I-95 in Philadelphia

Location
- Country: United States
- State: Pennsylvania
- Counties: Philadelphia, Delaware

Highway system
- Interstate Highway System; Main; Auxiliary; Suffixed; Business; Future; Pennsylvania State Route System; Interstate; US; State; Scenic; Legislative
← PA 692	→ PA 696

Interstate 695 (I-695) was an auxiliary Interstate Highway that was proposed in 1964 to connect I-95 in Southwest Philadelphia, at Philadelphia International Airport, with I-95 near the Delaware River waterfront near the Benjamin Franklin Bridge. Known as the Cobbs Creek Expressway between Southwest Philadelphia and I-76 and the Crosstown Expressway between I-76 and the waterfront, I-695 was designed to provide connections to Philadelphia International Airport and become part of a Center City Loop, with the Crosstown Expressway being the southern section of that loop (the Schuylkill Expressway was going to be the west section, the Vine Street Expressway as the north, and the Delaware Expressway as the east section).

== Route description ==
I-695 was to begin at I-95 near Philadelphia International Airport in Philadelphia. The freeway would head north to the east of Darby Creek, crossing into Delaware County near 84th Street. The road would cross Cobbs Creek and continue to the west of the creek, passing through Colwyn and Yeadon before passing near Mount Moriah Cemetery. I-695 would cross back into Philadelphia and turn east, running through West Philadelphia. The freeway would cross the Schuylkill River and intersect with the Schuylkill Expressway (I-76, previously I-676) near exit 346B. The Cobbs Creek Expressway would end and the Crosstown Expressway would begin, following Grays Avenue up to South Street, where the route would borrow the cut-and-cover design (which is used on the Vine Street and Delaware expressways) between the South Street/Bainbridge Street corridor, before ending at an intersection with I-95 (near the current exit 20).

== History ==
I-695 was first proposed in 1964. The project to build I-695 was canceled due to residential opposition in both Southwest Philadelphia and South Philadelphia, as well as residents of Yeadon, in Delaware County over the proposed Interstate's right-of-way, which would have cut their communities in half, and would have spelled an end to Cobbs Creek Park. The money slated for construction of I-695 went to the purchase of buses and trains for SEPTA, and for the construction of the Airport Line connecting Amtrak's Northeast Corridor with Philadelphia International Airport.

== Exit list ==
Exits were going to be located at these locations:

County	Location	mi	km	Destinations	Notes
Philadelphia	Philadelphia			I-95 (Delaware Expressway)	Planned southern terminus
Philadelphia	Philadelphia			84th Street	
Delaware	Darby			Front Street	
Delaware	Yeadon			US 1 (Lansdowne Expressway)	
Philadelphia	Philadelphia			US 1 (West Philadelphia Expressway)	
Philadelphia	Philadelphia			54th Street	
Philadelphia	Philadelphia			Woodland Avenue	
Philadelphia	Philadelphia			I-76 (Schuylkill Expressway)	
Philadelphia	Philadelphia			22nd Street	
Philadelphia	Philadelphia			PA 291 (Broad Street)	Broad Street now PA 611
Philadelphia	Philadelphia			5th Street	
Philadelphia	Philadelphia			I-95 (Delaware Expressway)	Planned northern terminus
1.000 mi = 1.609 km; 1.000 km = 0.621 mi
