= Susquehanna River Bridge (Interstate 76) =

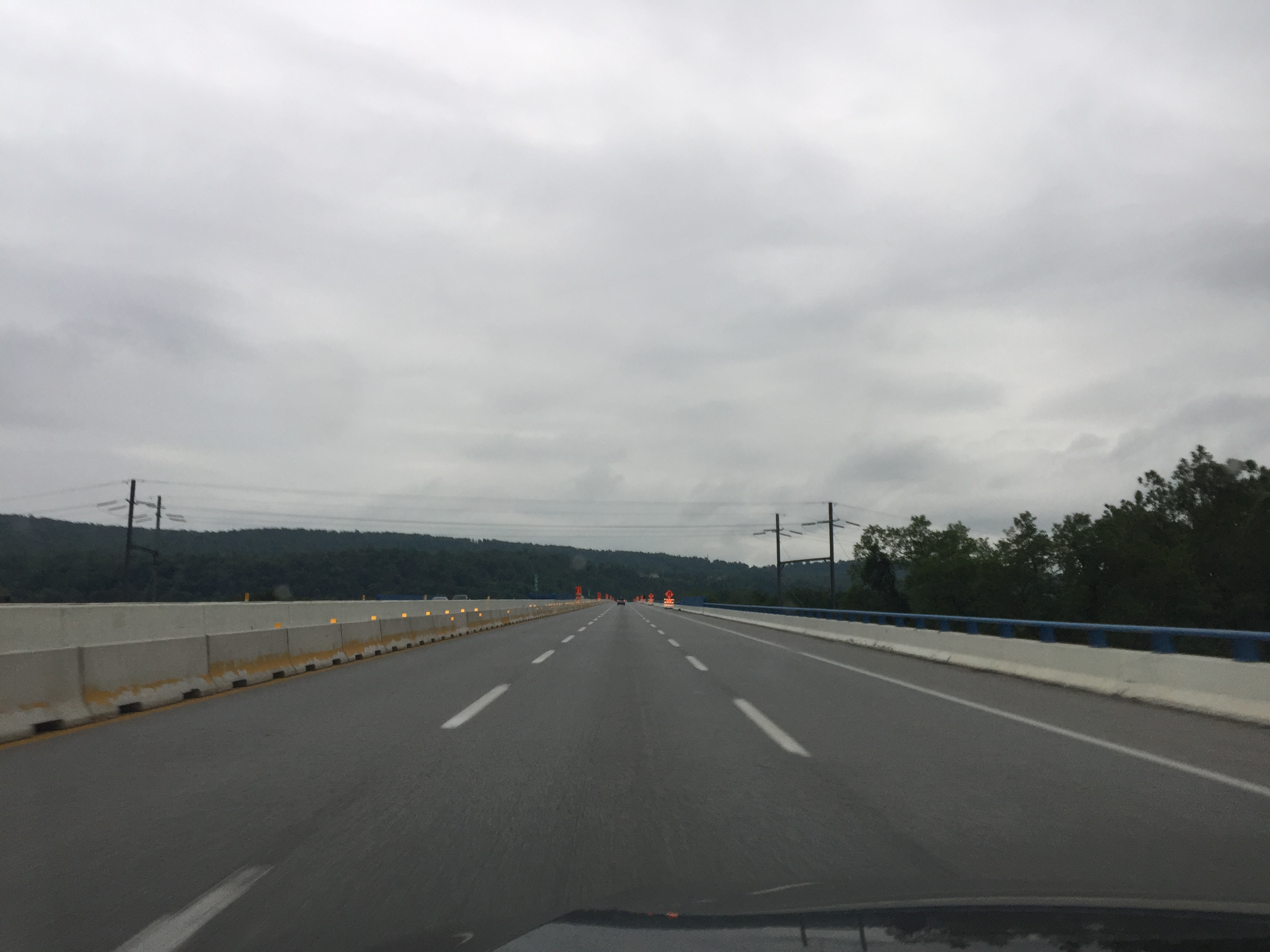
- Coordinates: 40°12′15″N 76°48′18″W
- Carries: 6 lanes of I-76 / Penna Turnpike
- Crosses: Susquehanna River
- Locale: Harrisburg, Pennsylvania
- Maintained by: Pennsylvania Turnpike Commission

Characteristics
- Design: 1950 bridge: steel plate girder bridge; 2007 bridge: concrete segmental bridge
- Total length: 4,526 feet

History
- Opened: old bridge: 1950; new bridge: 2007

Statistics
- Toll: Fares dictated by Pennsylvania Turnpike (E-ZPass)

The Susquehanna River Bridge carries the Pennsylvania Turnpike (Interstate 76) across the Susquehanna River between Dauphin and York County near Harrisburg, Pennsylvania.

== History ==
The original structure was built as a steel girder bridge with concrete piers. The steel was provided from a plant operated by Bethlehem Steel, directly adjacent to the turnpike in Steelton, Pennsylvania. It was opened to traffic in 1950.

On November 16, 2004, the Turnpike Commission let a contract for a bridge to replace the 1950 span. Two new 3-lane segmental, concrete signature spans were constructed just upriver from the old 4 lane span. The new span was the first of its type built in Pennsylvania at a cost of nearly $100 million . The westbound span opened on May 17, 2007, and the eastbound span was opened on June 17, 2007. The new roadway and bridges opened to normal traffic flow in the summer of 2008. The old span was demolished on August 22, 2007.

== See also ==
- List of crossings of the Susquehanna River
