= Ten Mile Loop =

Route information
- Existed: 1947–1977 (never built)

Major junctions
- West end: I-76 in Conshohocken
- PA 309 / PA 152 in Wyncote; US 1 in Philadelphia
- East end: I-95 in Philadelphia

Location
- Country: United States
- State: Pennsylvania

Highway system
- Pennsylvania State Route System; Interstate; US; State; Scenic; Legislative

The Ten Mile Loop Expressway was a proposed expressway in 1947 by the Philadelphia City Planning Commission to build an expressway along the northern edge of the city of Philadelphia. It was to have started from the Conshohocken Curve at Interstate 76 and ended at the Delaware Expressway.

== Route description ==
The Ten Mile Loop was to begin at an interchange with I-76 (Schuylkill Expressway) in Conshohocken, Montgomery County. From here, it would head northeast through Montgomery County, bypassing the Chestnut Hill section of Philadelphia to the northwest. The freeway would curve east and come to an interchange with PA 309 (former US 309, Fort Washington Expreesway) and PA 152 at Wyncote. From here, the Ten Mile Loop would pass through Jenkintown and Rockledge before crossing into Northeast Philadelphia and passing through the western end of Pennypack Park. The freeway would continue southeast and interchange with US 1, which was proposed to be routed on the Northeast Expressway. The Ten Mile Loop was to end at an interchange with I-95 at Academy Road.

== History ==
A northern bypass of Philadelphia was planned by the Philadelphia City Planning Commission in 1947 that would connect the Schuylkill Expressway, the Fort Washington Expressway, and the Delaware Expressway. The Ten Mile Loop was later proposed in the 1950s and 1960s to provide a northern bypass of Philadelphia. At one point, the Philadelphia City Planning Commission and the Delaware Valley Regional Planning Commission proposed extending the Ten Mile Loop east to Moorestown, New Jersey, crossing the Delaware River on the proposed Torresdale-Riverside Bridge. The Ten Mile Loop was expected to be completed in 1985. Funding for this project was halted in 1977 and the Philadelphia City Planning Commission removed the Ten Mile Loop from their plans.
