= North–South Freeway (New Jersey) =

The North-South Freeway is a major freeway in New Jersey that connects Philadelphia, Pennsylvania, to the major shore routes in Camden and Gloucester counties in New Jersey. It is numbered:

- Interstate 676 from the Benjamin Franklin Bridge in Camden to Interstate 76 near the Walt Whitman Bridge in Gloucester City
- Interstate 76 (Ohio–New Jersey) from Interstate 676 near the Walt Whitman Bridge in Gloucester City to Interstate 295 in Bellmawr
- New Jersey Route 42 from Interstate 295 in Bellmawr to the Atlantic City Expressway in Washington Township
