= Interstate 676 =

Highway in New Jersey and Pennsylvania

Interstate 676
- I-676 highlighted in red, PennDOT's definition of I-676 to I-95 in blue

Route information
- Auxiliary route of I-76 (Ohio–New Jersey)
- Maintained by PennDOT, DRPA, and NJDOT
- Length: 6.90 mi (11.10 km)
- Existed: 1964–present
- History: Completed in 1991
- NHS: Entire route

Major junctions
- West end: I-76 / US 30 in Philadelphia, PA
- PA 611 in Philadelphia, PA; I-95 in Philadelphia, PA; US 30 in Camden, NJ; CR 537 in Camden, NJ
- South end: I-76 / Route 76C / CR 630 at the Camden–Gloucester city line

Location
- Country: United States
- States: Pennsylvania, New Jersey
- Counties: Pennsylvania: Philadelphia; New Jersey: Camden

Highway system
- Interstate Highway System; Main; Auxiliary; Suffixed; Business; Future
- Pennsylvania State Route System; Interstate; US; State; Scenic; Legislative
- New Jersey State Highway Routes; Interstate; US; State; Scenic Byways
← PA 672	Pennsylvania	→ PA 680
← Route 495	New Jersey	→ I-695

Interstate 676 (I-676) is an auxiliary US Interstate Highway that serves as a major thoroughfare through Center City Philadelphia, where it is known as the Vine Street Expressway, and Camden, New Jersey, where it is known as the northern segment of the North–South Freeway, as well as the Martin Luther King Jr. Memorial Highway in honor of civil rights leader Martin Luther King Jr. Its western terminus is at I-76 in Philadelphia near the Philadelphia Museum of Art and Fairmount Park. From there, it heads east through Center City Philadelphia and is then routed on surface streets near Franklin Square and Independence National Historical Park, home of the Liberty Bell, before crossing the Delaware River on the Benjamin Franklin Bridge. On the New Jersey side of the bridge, the highway heads south through Camden to its southern terminus at I-76 in Gloucester City near the Walt Whitman Bridge. Between its western terminus and downtown Camden, I-676 is concurrent with U.S. Route 30 (US 30).

After World War II, freeway approaches were planned for both sides of the Benjamin Franklin Bridge, which was completed in 1926 and serves as a part of US 30. In Pennsylvania, the Vine Street Expressway was planned to run along the northern edge of Center City to the Schuylkill River, while, in New Jersey, the North–South Freeway was to head south along the Route 42 corridor. When the Interstate Highway System was created in the 1950s, this stretch of highway was a part of I-80S, with Interstate 680 (I-680) continuing on the Schuylkill Expressway to the Walt Whitman Bridge.

In 1964, the designations became I-76 and I-676, respectively, and, in 1972, the two routes were switched onto their current alignments. I-676 in New Jersey was completed between I-76 and Morgan Street by 1960 and north of there to downtown Camden by the 1980s. The Vine Street Expressway was opened from the Schuylkill Expressway to 18th Street by 1960 and east of there to I-95 on January 10, 1991, despite opposition from the adjacent community and other obstacles to construction. There are grade-level intersections with traffic signals in the connections between the Vine Street Expressway and the Benjamin Franklin Bridge. This intersection does not follow typical rules and regulations of the Interstate Highway System, and is also notorious for having high crash rates and pedestrian fatalities.

== Route description ==
=== Pennsylvania ===
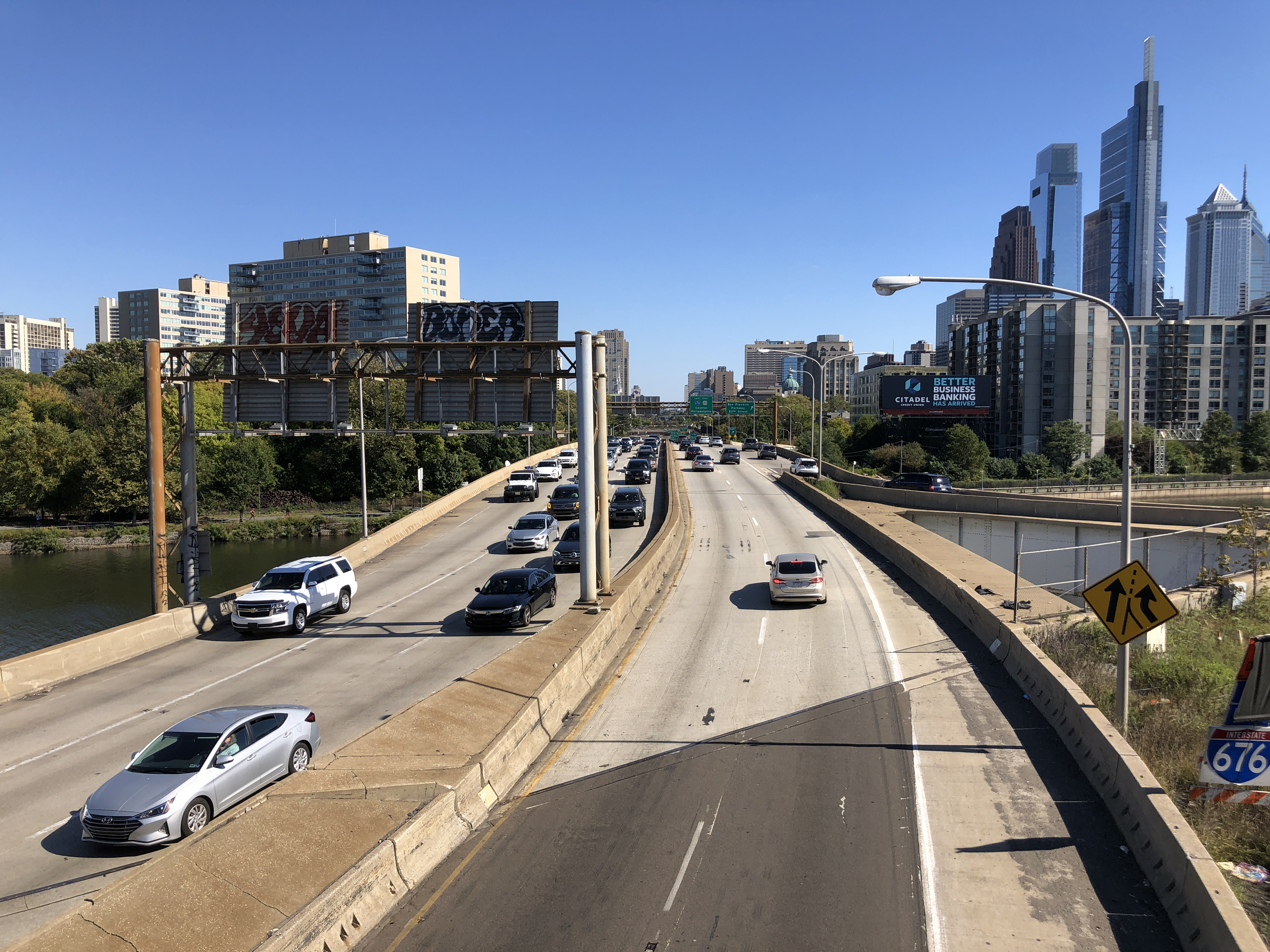
I-676/US 30 (Vine Street Expressway) eastbound crossing the Schuylkill River and entering Center City Philadelphia

I-676 begins at an interchange with the Schuylkill Expressway (I-76 and US 30) in the city of Philadelphia in Philadelphia County, Pennsylvania, heading to the east on the six-lane Vine Street Expressway concurrent with US 30. It immediately crosses the Schuylkill River and then the Schuylkill River Trail and CSX Transportation's Philadelphia Subdivision railroad line on the river's east bank on the Vine Street Expressway Bridge, before coming to an interchange with 23rd Street and 22nd Street and the Benjamin Franklin Parkway that has access to the Philadelphia Museum of Art and the Franklin Institute science museum. From this point, the Vine Street Expressway enters a depressed road cut and passes under several streets and two freeway lids, running along the northern edge of Center City. Vine Street serves as a street-level frontage road to the freeway. Within this alignment, there is an exit for Pennsylvania Route 611 (PA 611; Broad Street). After passing under 10th Street in Chinatown, the last street the depressed alignment passes under, the highway rises up and reaches a split between the Vine Street Expressway, which continues to I-95, and I-676/US 30. At this split, there is also an eastbound exit and westbound entrance for 8th Street. After exiting the Vine Street Expressway, eastbound I-676/US 30 has a brief at-grade portion along southbound 6th Street east of Franklin Square to the Benjamin Franklin Bridge approach, where westbound and eastbound traffic actually have a traffic light intersecting Franklin Street and 6th Street respectively, an example of a non–limited access section of Interstate Highway. Westbound I-676/US 30 has a ramp from the bridge to the Vine Street Expressway that intersects 7th Street and 8th Street at-grade. From this point, I-676/US 30 crosses over I-95, Christopher Columbus Boulevard, and then the Delaware River on the seven-lane Benjamin Franklin Bridge, which also carries pedestrians and the PATCO Speedline. This bridge and its approaches are maintained by the Delaware River Port Authority (DRPA).

=== New Jersey ===
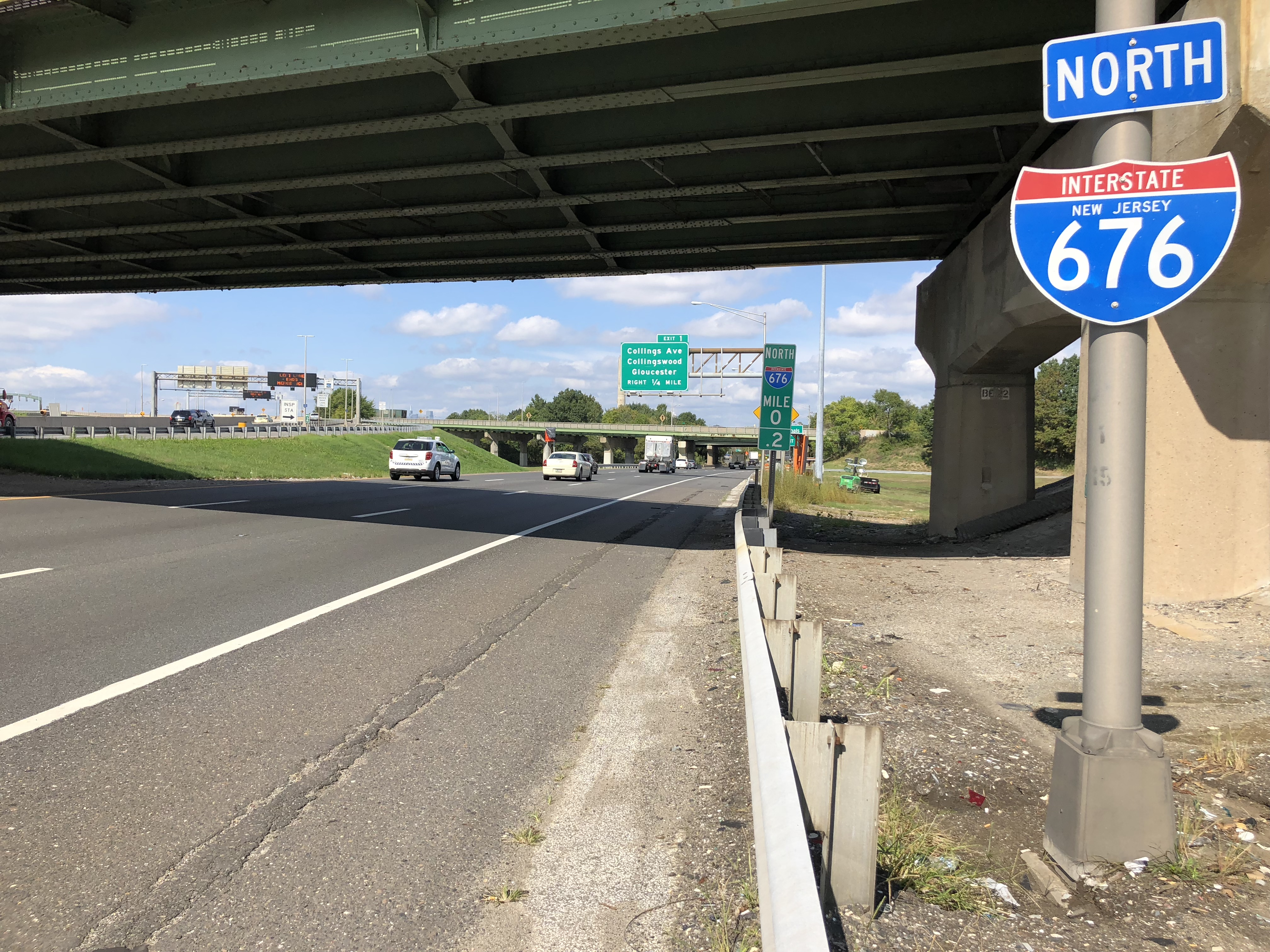
View north along I-676 just north of I-76 in Camden, New Jersey

After crossing the bridge, the freeway enters the downtown area of the city of Camden in Camden County, New Jersey, and passes to the north of the Camden Athletic Complex, located at the former site of the Campbell's Field baseball stadium. Upon entering New Jersey, I-676 becomes signed as a north–south road. There is a southbound ramp to 6th Street in Camden, which is near the toll plaza for northbound traffic. After the toll plaza, US 30 splits from I-676 at an interchange, at which point I-676 turns south as a six-lane freeway called the Martin Luther King Memorial Highway or the North–South Freeway. Immediately after the US 30 split, there is an interchange with County Route 537 (CR 537; Market Street/Federal Street) and Martin Luther King Boulevard that provides access to downtown Camden. Within this interchange, the highway passes over NJ Transit's River Line. From this point, I-676 continues south through urban areas of the city, passing over several streets and running immediately to the west of Conrail Shared Assets Operations (CSAO)'s Vineland Secondary railroad line and the PATCO Speedline. The road heads southwest on a viaduct over neighborhoods before the interchange with CR 607 (Kaighns Avenue) and Atlantic Avenue. I-676 turns south at this junction, crossing over the Vineland Secondary. The highway continues south and passes over CSAO's Beesleys Point Secondary railroad line before it comes to the exit for Morgan Boulevard. Past Morgan Boulevard, the freeway crosses the north branch of Newton Creek. Here, I-676 ends at an interchange east of the Walt Whitman Bridge with I-76, CR 630 (Collings Avenue), and unsigned Route 76C, the latter being an access road to US 130 and Route 168. The North–South Freeway becomes a part of I-76 past this interchange and continues into the city of Gloucester City.

== History ==
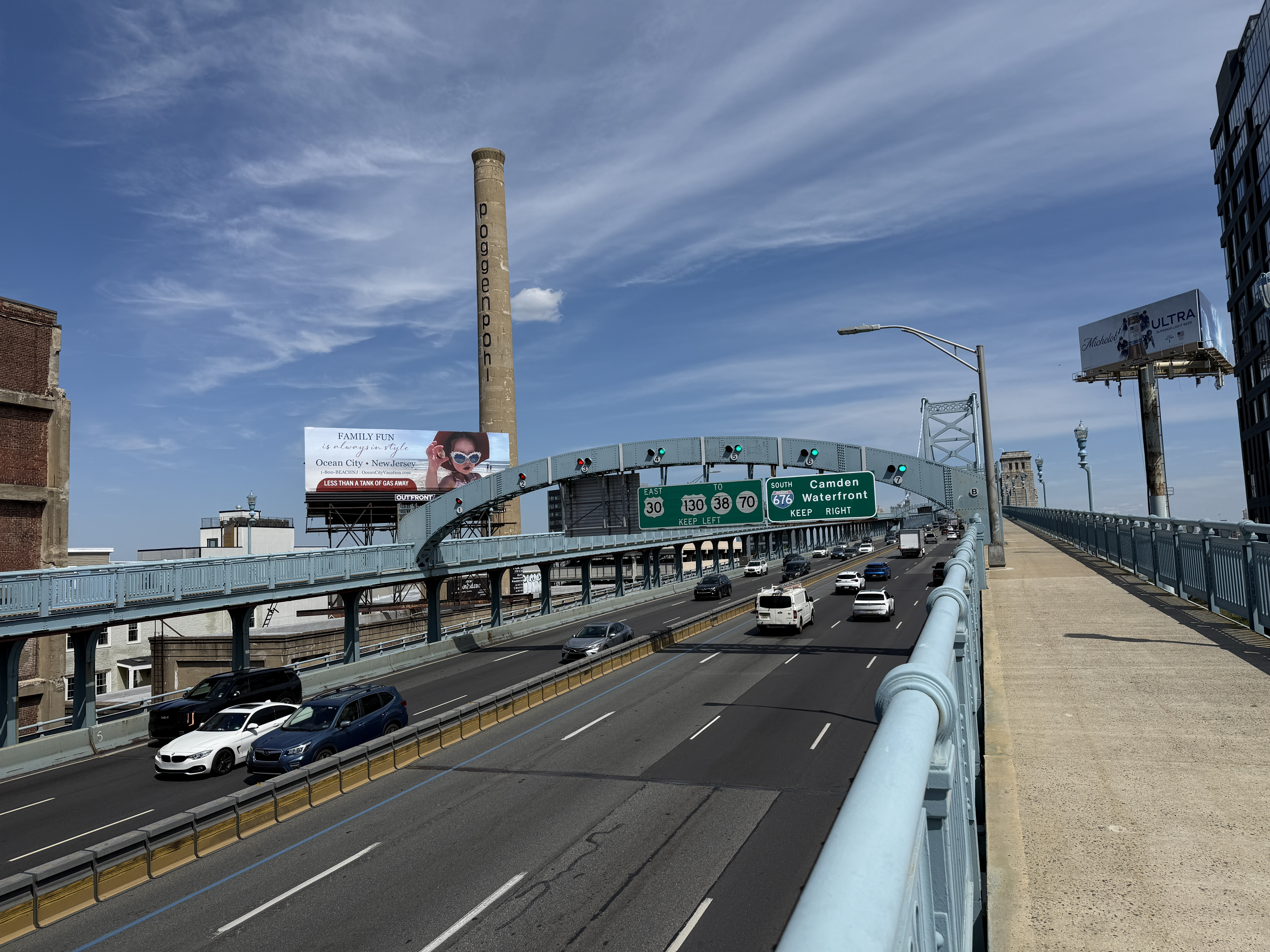
I-676/US 30 eastbound on the Benjamin Franklin Bridge leaving Philadelphia, Pennsylvania

The Benjamin Franklin Bridge was opened on July 1, 1926, and was designated to carry US 30 across the Delaware River. A parkway called the Camden–Atlantic City Parkway was planned in 1932 to connect the Benjamin Franklin Bridge southeast to Atlantic City; this was never built. After World War II, freeway connections were planned on both sides of the Benjamin Franklin Bridge. In Philadelphia, the Vine Street Expressway was planned to run along the Vine Street corridor to the present-day Schuylkill Expressway in 1945. The North–South Freeway was proposed in New Jersey as a connection from the bridge south along the Route 42 corridor. In 1950, the city of Philadelphia began planning the construction of the Vine Street Expressway, which would run along a depressed alignment through the city. In the 1960s, the North—South Freeway began construction through Camden. 1,289 families were displaced due the construction of the freeway, 85% of which were nonwhite families.

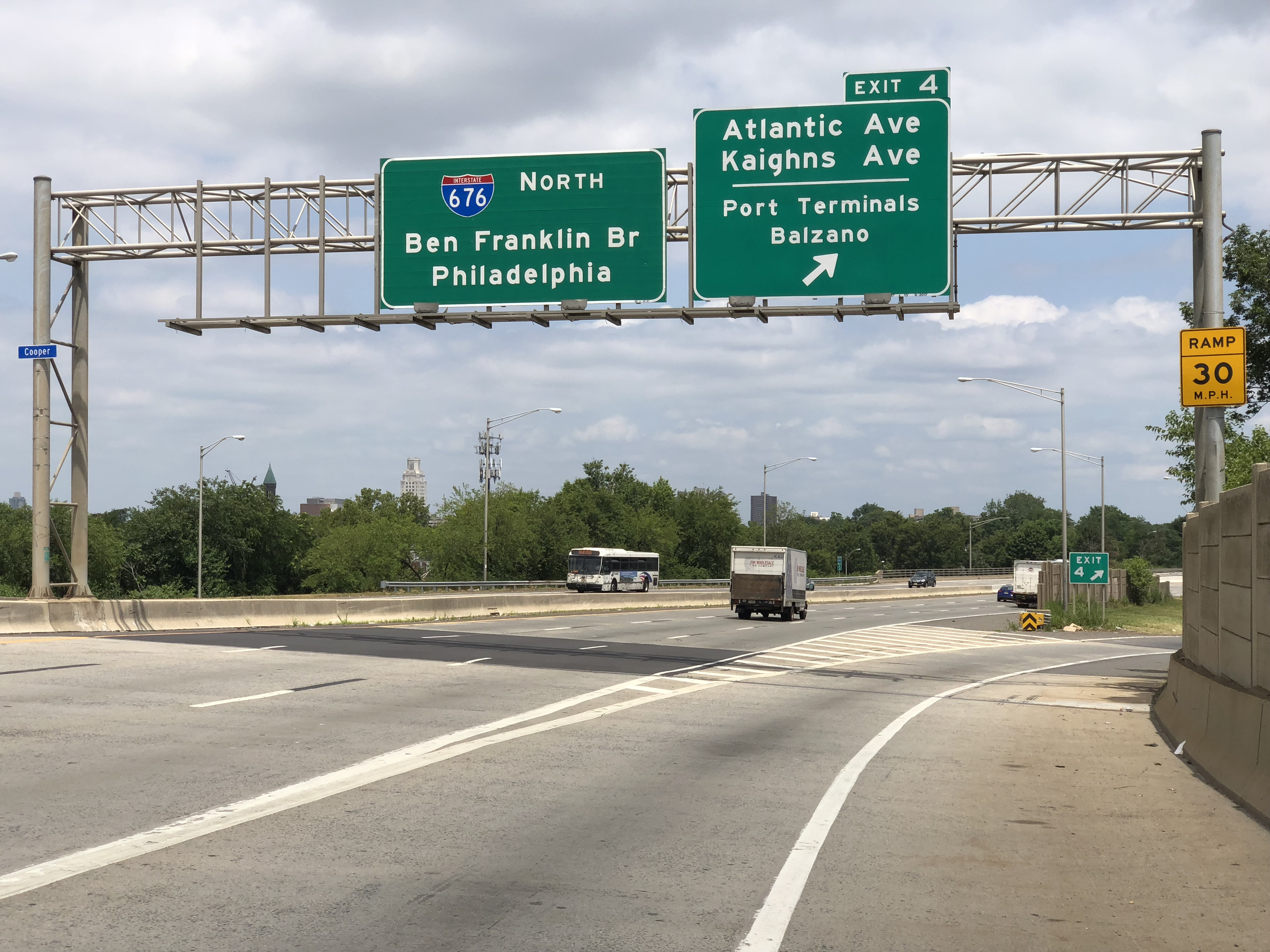
I-676 northbound at the Atlantic Avenue/Kaighns Avenue interchange in Camden, New Jersey

When the Interstate Highway System was created in the 1950s, the Vine Street Expressway, Benjamin Franklin Bridge, and part of the North–South Freeway were to become a part of it. In New Jersey, this Interstate was initially designated as FAI Corridor 109. In 1958, this freeway was initially planned as I-895 and I-380 before the American Association of State Highway Officials designated it as a part of I-80S. Meanwhile, I-680 was designated along the present-day Schuylkill Expressway between the Vine Street Expressway and the Walt Whitman Bridge. By 1960, the Vine Street Expressway had been completed between the Schuylkill Expressway and 18th Street. The portion of I-80S in New Jersey on the North–South Freeway had opened south of Morgan Boulevard by this time. On April 16, 1963, Pennsylvania wanted to renumber its Interstate numbers. Part of this was the renumbering from I-80S into I-76 and all of its auxiliary routes into I-X76. The Federal Highway Administration (FHWA) approved the request on February 26, 1964. As a result, I-80S became I-76 and I-680 became I-676. In 1972, the I-76 and the I-676 designations were switched onto their current routes. The remainder of the New Jersey portion of I-676 between Morgan Boulevard and US 30 was completed by the 1980s.

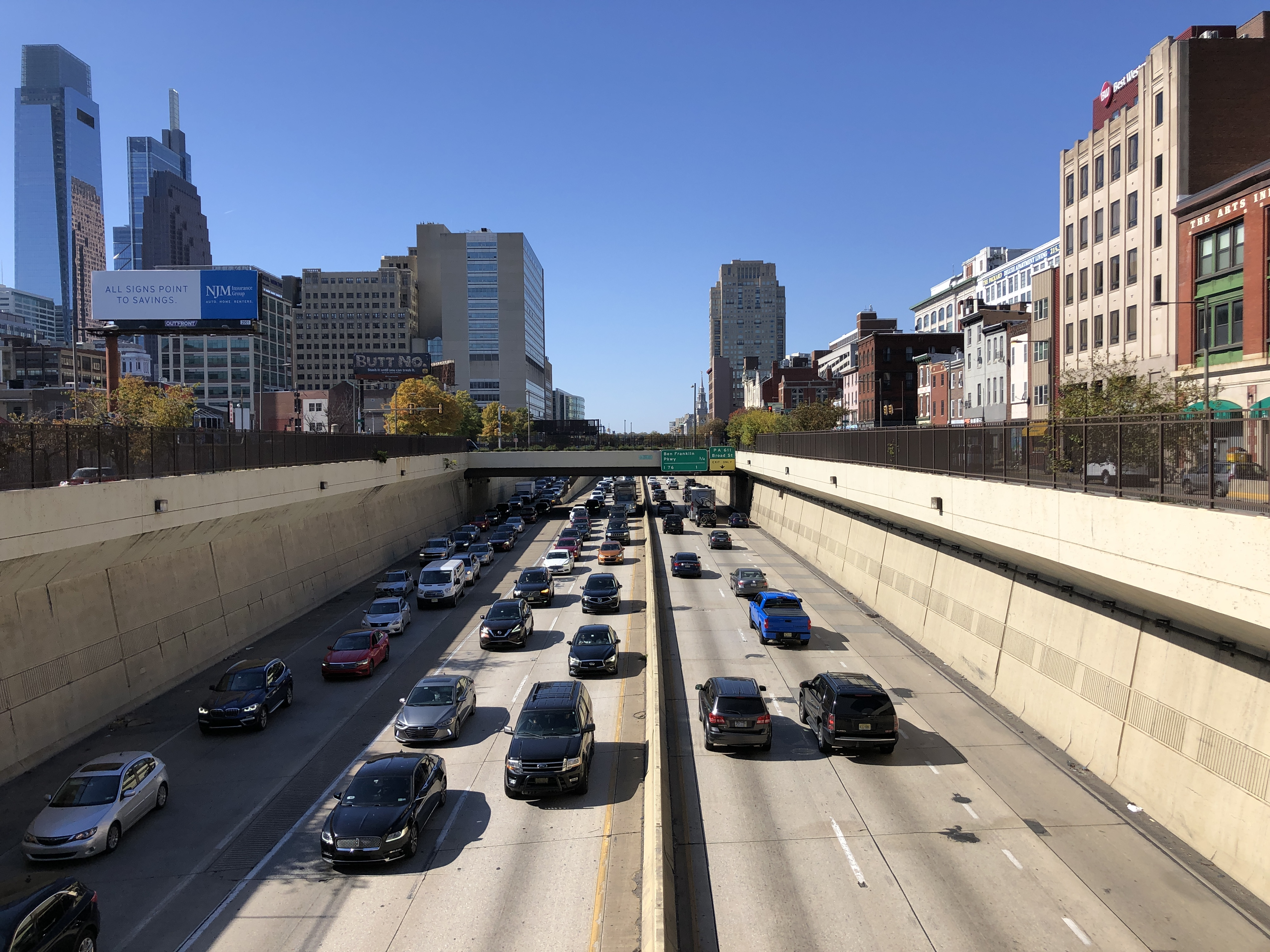
I-676/US 30 (Vine Street Expressway) westbound in Center City Philadelphia

There were several challenges in building the Vine Street Expressway between 18th Street and the Benjamin Franklin Bridge. The road was to run through developed areas of Philadelphia, intersecting several streets and railroad lines. The Chinatown community organized in opposition to the highway construction through their neighborhood. In addition, the route was to run through Franklin Square, a historically sensitive site, to connect to the Benjamin Franklin Bridge. As a result, the routing was modified in 1966 to avoid many of these obstacles. The route was to avoid running through Franklin Square, leading to the eastbound direction using surface streets to access the Benjamin Franklin Bridge, and a planned connector to Market Street was removed. In the 1970s, the proposed freeway's environmental impact statement (EIS) had to be evaluated again per new guidelines; when the new EIS was issued in 1977, it was found that more improvements were needed for mass transit in the area of the planned freeway. To comply with this, provisions were made concerning the proposed underground Center City Commuter Connection for SEPTA Regional Rail, in which the railroad tracks would pass under I-676 and residences would be built over the railroad tunnel in Chinatown. Construction was approved in 1986 on the Vine Street Expressway from 18th Street to the Benjamin Franklin Bridge, with no provisions for elevated connections between the Benjamin Franklin Bridge and the Vine Street Expressway to avoid disturbing Franklin Square. This portion of the Vine Street Expressway opened to traffic on January 10, 1991, completing I-676.

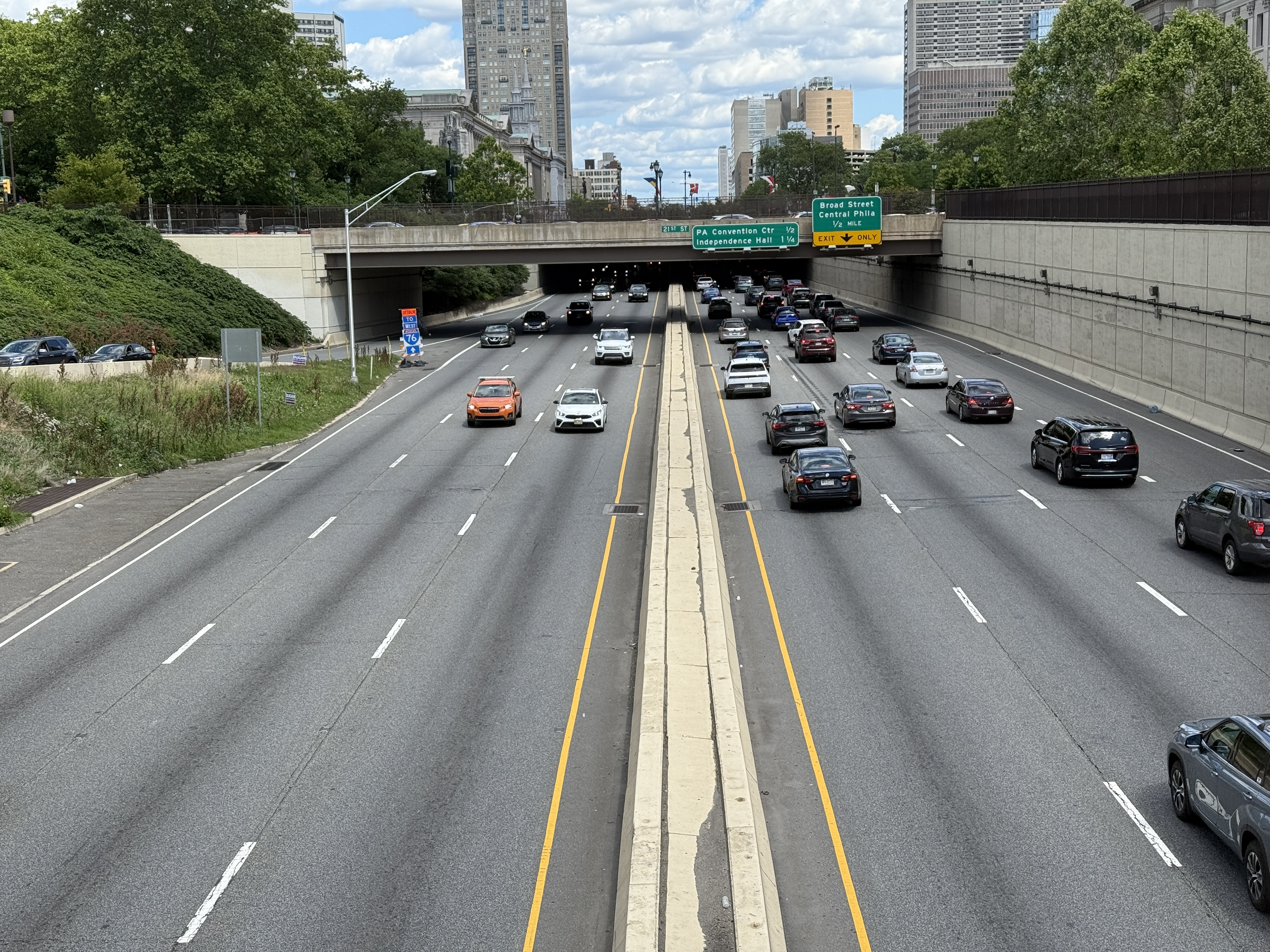
I-676/US 30 (Vine Street Expressway) eastbound in Center City Philadelphia

On April 14, 2015, the Pennsylvania Department of Transportation (PennDOT) began work to rebuild seven existing overpasses on the Vine Street Expressway portion of I-676. The project, which cost $64.8 million (equivalent to $78.2 million in 2024), was to be completed in late 2019. Since 2021, the new overpasses started to have traffic. After the remnants of Hurricane Ida passed through the area on September 1, 2021, intense rain and floodwaters from the swollen Schuylkill River flooded the expressway after drainage pumps failed. I-676 through Philadelphia remained closed for three days.

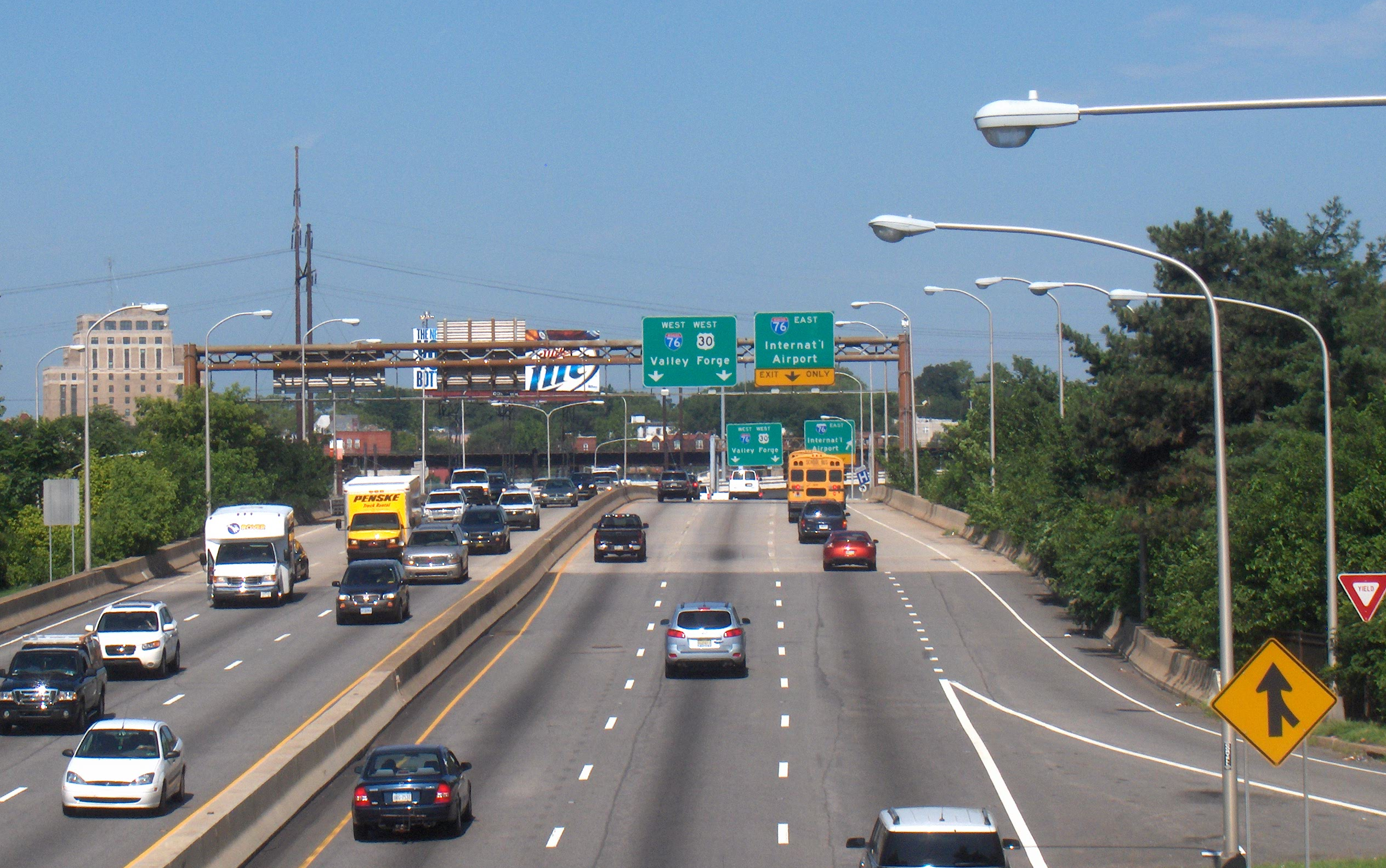
I-676 crosses the Vine Street Expressway Bridge

In 2022, the city of Philadelphia applied for federal funds to initiate a study to cap the freeway and reconnect the affected neighborhoods to Center City. Capping the Vine Street Expressway is part of the 2017 Chinatown Neighborhood Plan. The city government selected a design in December 2023; at the time, the project was estimated to cost $160 million and be completed in the early 2030s. A $158.9 million federal grant was approved for the project in March 2024.

== Major intersections ==
State	County	Location	mi	km	Exit	Destinations	Notes
Pennsylvania	Philadelphia	Philadelphia	0.00	0.00		I-76 / US 30 west – Valley Forge, International Airport	Western terminus; western end of US 30 concurrency; exit 344 on I-76; to Fairmount Park, Philadelphia Zoo, 30th Street Station
Pennsylvania	Philadelphia	Philadelphia			Vine Street Expressway Bridge over Schuylkill River		
Pennsylvania	Philadelphia	Philadelphia	0.41	0.66		Ben Franklin Parkway / 23rd Street	
Pennsylvania	Philadelphia	Philadelphia	0.78	1.26		PA 611 (Broad Street) – Central Philadelphia	
Pennsylvania	Philadelphia	Philadelphia	1.43– 1.47	2.30– 2.37		I-95 – New York, Chester, Philadelphia International Airport	No eastbound entrance; access via Vine Street Expressway; exit 22 on I-95; to Penn's Landing
Pennsylvania	Philadelphia	Philadelphia	1.43– 1.47	2.30– 2.37		Vine Street to PA 611 – Pennsylvania Convention Center	Westbound exit and eastbound entrance
Pennsylvania	Philadelphia	Philadelphia	1.43– 1.47	2.30– 2.37	Eastern end of freeway section		
Pennsylvania	Philadelphia	Philadelphia	1.43– 1.47	2.30– 2.37		8th Street south – Chinatown, Market East	
Pennsylvania	Philadelphia	Philadelphia	1.86	2.99		6th Street south – Independence Hall, Penn's Landing	
Pennsylvania	Philadelphia	Philadelphia	1.86	2.99	Western end of freeway section		
Pennsylvania	Philadelphia	Philadelphia				5th Street	Westbound exit and eastbound entrance
Delaware River			2.15 4.75	3.46 7.64	Benjamin Franklin Bridge (north/westbound toll; cash or E-ZPass)		
New Jersey	Camden	Camden	3.84	6.18	5B	6th Street / Broadway – Downtown Camden, Rutgers University	Exit number not signed southbound; last northbound exit before toll
New Jersey	Camden	Camden	3.50	5.63		US 30 east to N.J. Turnpike north / US 130 / Route 38 east / Route 70 east – Cherry Hill, Trenton	Southbound exit and northbound entrance; southern end of US 30 concurrency
New Jersey	Camden	Camden	3.37	5.42	5B	Market Street (CR 537) – Downtown Camden, Adventure Aquarium	Southbound exit only
New Jersey	Camden	Camden	3.28	5.28	5A	To US 30 east / MLK Boulevard / Campbell Place	No northbound entrance; access via Federal Street; US 30 not signed southbound; to Cooper University Hospital and Adventure Aquarium
New Jersey	Camden	Camden	2.27	3.65	4	Kaighns Avenue (CR 607) / Atlantic Avenue	
New Jersey	Camden	Camden	1.14	1.83	3	Holtec Boulevard / Broadway (CR 551 south) – Port Terminals, Gloucester City	
New Jersey	Camden	Camden	0.36– 0.22	0.58– 0.35	2	I-76 Toll west (Walt Whitman Bridge) – Philadelphia	Southbound exit and northbound entrance; exit 354 on I-76
New Jersey	Camden	Camden	0.36– 0.22	0.58– 0.35	1	Collings Road (CR 630) – Gloucester, Collingswood	Signed as exits 1C (west) and 1B (east) southbound; signed as Collings Avenue
New Jersey	Camden	Camden	0.36– 0.22	0.58– 0.35	1A	To US 130 north / Route 168 south – Camden, Trenton	Southbound exit and northbound entrance; access via Route 76C
New Jersey	Camden	Gloucester City	0.00	0.00		I-76 east to I-295 / Route 42 south – Atlantic City, Delaware Memorial Bridge	Southern terminus; exit 2 on I-76
1.000 mi = 1.609 km; 1.000 km = 0.621 mi: Concurrency terminus; Incomplete access; Tolled
