= Mark d'Inverno =

British computer scientist

- Born: 29 August 1965 (age 61)
- Education: University of Oxford; University College London
- Scientific career
- Fields: Computer science, software engineering, formal methods, software agents, interdisciplinary
- Workplaces: Goldsmiths College, University of London; Goldsmiths, University of London

Mark d'Inverno (born 29 August 1965) is a British computer scientist, currently a professor of Computer Science at Goldsmiths, University of London, in east London, England.

== Biography ==
d'Inverno studied for an MA in Mathematics and an MSc in Computation at St Catherine's College, Oxford. He was awarded a PhD from University College London in artificial intelligence.

For four years between 2007 and 2011, d'Inverno head of the Department of Computing, which has championed interdisciplinary research and teaching around computers and creativity for nearly a decade. He has published over 100 articles including books, journal and conference articles and has led recent research projects in a diverse range of fields relating to computer science including multi-agent systems, systems biology, art, design, and music. He is currently the principal investigator or co-investigator on a range of projects including designing systems for sharing online cultural experiences, connecting communities through video orchestration, building online communities of music practice.

In 2011/12, d'Inverno took a research sabbatical shared between the Artificial Intelligence Research Institute in Barcelona, Spain, and Sony Computer Science Laboratory in Paris, France.

== Musical activities ==
d'Inverno is a jazz pianist and composer, his album Joy receiving a number of favourable reviews and over the last few decades has led a variety of bands in a range of different musical genres (e.g., the Mark d'Inverno Quintet), his album Joy receiving a number of critical plaudits, and playing in London at venues including the National Theatre, London.

== Personal life ==
d'Inverno was an original trustee and the first chairman of the charity Safe Ground in 1994, which in more recent years or so has developed a range of courses that were originally devised by prisoners that have been delivered in a large number of UK prisons including Family Man and Father's Inside.

Mark d'Inverno has been captain of the Weekenders Cricket Club for 11 years, which was founded by the actor Clive Swift, with the writer Christopher Douglas as its long-serving secretary.

d'Inverno is partner to the theatre and opera director Melly Still.

== See also ==
- AgentSpeak, an agent-oriented programming language
- Distributed multi-agent reasoning system (dMARS), a platform for intelligent agents

== Selected books and papers ==
- J. McCormack and M. d'Inverno, Computers and Creativity, Springer, 2012.
- M. d'Inverno and M.Luck, Understanding Agent Systems, 2nd edition, Springer, 2004.
- Mark d'Inverno and Michael Luck, Creativity through Autonomy and Interaction, Cognitive Computing, 2012.
- Mark d'Inverno, Michael Luck, Pablo Noriega, Juan Rodriguez-Aguilar and Carles Sierra, A framework for communication in open systems, Artificial Intelligence, 186:38–94, 2012.
- Ben Fields, Kurt Jacobson, Christophe Rhodes, Mark d'Inverno, Mark Sandler and Michael Casey, Analysis and Exploitation of Musician Social Networks for Recommendation and Discovery, IEEE Transactions on Multimedia, 13(4): 674–686, 2011.
- Jon Bird, Mark d'Inverno and Jane Prophet, Net Work: An Interactive Artwork Designed Using an Interdisciplinary Collaborative Approach, Special Issue on Computational Models of Creativity in the Arts, Journal of Digital Creativity, 18(1), 1123, 2007.
- Mark d'Inverno, Michael Luck, Michael Georgeff, David Kinny and Michael Wooldridge, The dMARS architecture: A specification of the distributed multi-agent reasoning system, Autonomous Agents and Multi-Agent Systems, 9(1–2):5–53, 2004.
- Jon McCormack and Mark d'Inverno, Why does Computing matter to Creativity?, in Jon McCormack and Mark d'Inverno (eds.), Springer, 2012.
- Mark d'Inverno, Neil Theise and Jane Prophet, Mathematical modelling of stem cells: a complexity primer for the stem cell biologist, In Christopher Potten, Jim Watson, Robert Clarke, and Andrew Renehan, editors, Tissue Stem Cells: Biology and Applications, pages 1–15, Taylor and Francis, 2008.
- Michael O. Jewell, Christophe Rhodes, and Mark d'Inverno, Querying Improvised Music: Do You Sound Like Yourself? 11th International Society for Music Information Retrieval Conference (ISMIR 2010), pages 483–488, 2010.
