= SARL =

SARL is an acronym with a few potential meanings:

- South Australian Rugby League, governing body for rugby league football in South Australia
- Société à responsabilité limitée (English: society of/with limited responsibility), a French name designating a type of business entity
- Sociedade anónima de responsabilidade limitada (English: anonymous society of/with limited responsibility), a Portuguese name for a type of business entity
- South African Radio League
- The Spencer Art Reference Library, a library in the Nelson-Aitkens Art Museum in Kansas City, Missouri, United States
- Suvarnabhumi Airport Rail Link, a rail link from Suvarnabhumi Airport to Phaya Thai in Bangkok, Thailand
- SARL agent-oriented programming language, a computer programming language.
