= Retroactive learning =

AI training technique

Within theories of education, retroactive learning is a delay in understanding an experience, or review of learning experiences when resources become available.

Often, it is not possible to learn while an event is occurring because the agent lacks the specific information or resources that it needs to learn. For example, an agent in a realtime environment may not have time to apply an iterative learning algorithm while it is performing a task. However, when a resource like time becomes available, the agent can replay the events and learn from them. Episodic memory allows previous experiences to be relived or rehearsed once resources are available so it can be reanalyzed with new knowledge or additional experiences.
