= Fuzzy agent =

In computer science a fuzzy agent is a software agent that implements fuzzy logic. This software entity interacts with its environment through an adaptive rule-base and can therefore be considered a type of intelligent agent.
