= Jat (disambiguation) =

The Jats are a ethnocutural group of India and Pakistan.

JAT or JATS may also refer to:

== Airlines ==
- Jat Airways, a former Serbian and Yugoslavian airline
- Japan Air Transport (JAT), a defunct airline of Japan

== Computing ==
- Java Astrodynamics Toolkit (JAT)
- Java Agent Template (JATS)
- Journal Article Tag Suite (JATS), an XML format

== Journals ==
- Journal of Analytical Toxicology (JAT)
- Journal of the Adventist Theological Society (JATS)

== Other uses ==
- Jat of Afghanistan, peripatetic groups of Afghanistan
- Jat, Sangli, a town in Maharashtra, India
  - Jat (Vidhan Sabha constituency)
- Jat or Yat (Ѣ, ѣ), a letter of the old Cyrillic alphabet
- Jaat (film), a 2025 Indian film by Gopichandh Malineni
- Jat Regiment, Indian Army
- Japan Association of Translators (JAT)
- James Arnold Taylor, American voice actor
- Joint Air Training Scheme (JATS), part of the WW2 British Commonwealth Air Training Plan
- Jaysh al-Thuwar, a militia in the Free Syrian Army/Syrian Democratic Forces
- Jammu Tawi railway station (station code: JAT), in India-administered Jammu and Kashmir

== See also ==
- Jati (disambiguation)
- Jatni (disambiguation)
- Jatt (disambiguation)
- Jatki (disambiguation)
- Zuṭṭ, a people in medieval Arabic literature identified with the Jats
