= GORITE =

GORITE or Goal ORIented TEams is a Java platform for implementing Team Oriented designs for Intelligent software agents.

== See also ==
- Belief–Desire–Intention (BDI) software model
- Procedural Reasoning System
