= Jati =

Jati or JATI may refer to:

== Places ==
- Jati, Ceará, a city in Brazil
- Jati Taluka, an administrative division of Sujawal District in Sindh, Pakistan
- Jati Umra (Lahore), a town in Punjab, Pakistan
- Jati Umra (Amritsar), a village in Punjab, India

== Other uses ==
- Jāti, a term for the thousands of clans, tribes, castes and sub-castes in India
- Jāti (Buddhism), the arising of a new living entity
- Teak, the Indonesian name for the hardwood tree
- Jatimatic, a Finnish 9 mm submachine gun
- Jati (music), a rhythmic pattern in Indian classical music
- Jalur Tiga, an NGO in Malaysia
- B. D. Jatti, former Indian president

== See also ==
- Jat (disambiguation)
- Jatni (disambiguation)
