= Computable knowledge =

Computable knowledge may refer to:

- Knowledge-based system
  - Reasoning system
  - Semantic reasoner
  - Inference engine
- Knowledge representation and reasoning
  - Automated reasoning
  - Question answering
  - Logic programming
