= D'Inverno =

d'Inverno (Italian pronunciation: [diɱˈvɛrno]) is a surname and may be:

- Mark d'Inverno, British computer scientist
- Ray d'Inverno, computer scientist
- Brigadier JG d'Inverno, Scottish Judge and the senior Army Reserves Officer in Scotland.

d'Inverno means "of winter" in Italian.

== See also ==
- Giardino d'Inverno ("Winter Garden") at the Orto botanico di Palermo
- Vacanze d'inverno ("Winter Holidays"), a 1959 Italian comedy film
- Se una notte d'inverno un viaggiatore ("If on a winter's night a traveler"), a 1979 novel by Italo Calvino
- Lua d'Inverno, a track on Wolfheart, the first album by Moonspell in 1995
