= Web agent =

Web agent may refer to:

- Web browser
- Software agent in the Web
