= Monitoring and surveillance agents =

Monitoring and surveillance agents (also known as predictive agents) are a type of intelligent agent software that observes and reports on computer equipment. Monitoring and surveillance agents are often used to monitor complex computer networks to predict when a crash or some other defect may occur. Another type of monitoring and surveillance agent works on computer networks keeping track of the configuration of each computer connected to the network. It tracks and updates the central configuration database when anything on any computer changes, such as the number or type of disk drives. An important task in managing networks lies in prioritizing traffic and shaping bandwidth.

== See also ==
- Software agent
- Cfengine
- Nagios
- Ganglia
