= Christian Guttmann =

Scientist in artificial intelligence

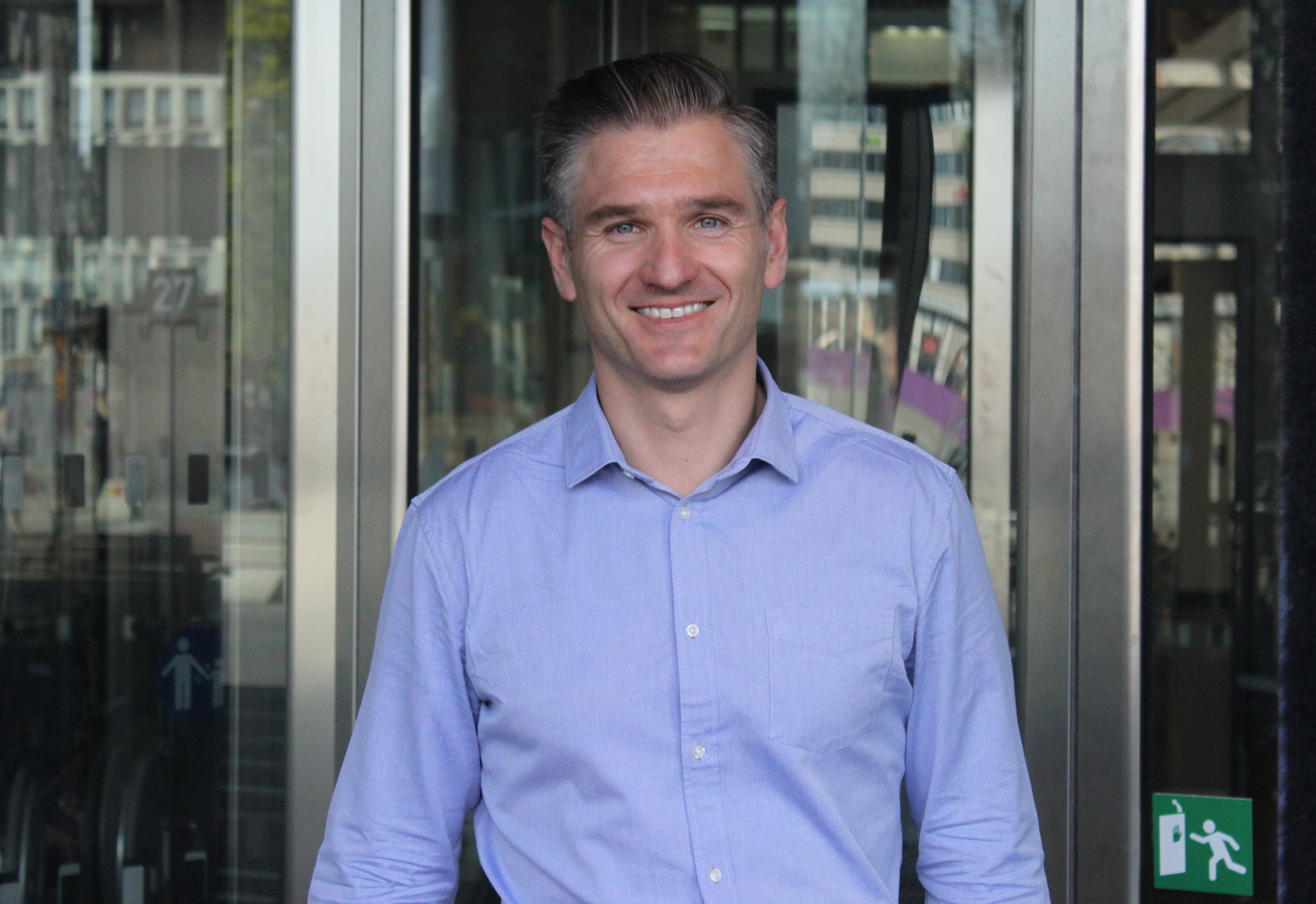
Dr. Christian Guttmann, founder of NAII, Nordic Artificial Intelligence Institute

Christian Guttmann is an entrepreneur, business executive and scientist in artificial intelligence and multi-agent systems whose career has focused on the strategy, commercialization and deployment of AI systems and products. He is executive director of the Nordic Artificial Intelligence Institute which is based in Stockholm, Sweden.

Guttmann has served as Managing Director and Head of AI Tech at EQT Group, Vice President of AI and Engineering at Pegasystems, and Chief AI and Data Officer at Tieto. He is an adjunct senior researcher at Karolinska Institute and was an adjunct associate professor at the University of New South Wales, Australia. He has edited several volumes on artificial intelligence and multi-agent systems, and has authored numerous publications and patents in the field. His commentary on artificial intelligence strategy, adoption and governance has been appeared in outlets including The Guardian, Sky News, MIT Sloan Management Review, Dagens Industri, and Tivi and he has participated as speaker at international artificial intelligence and technology conferences.

== Biography ==
Christian Guttmann grew up in Germany and Australia, and spent much of his life in Sweden, where he studied Artificial Intelligence, Quantum technology and Psychology in the late 90s. He moved back to Australia around the millennium, completed his PhD in Artificial Intelligence and after an extended period in Melbourne and Sydney in Australia, he moved again to Sweden in 2014.

Guttmann holds degrees in artificial intelligence and psychology at Monash University (Australia), Stockholm university and Royal Instittute of Technology (Sweden), and Paderborn University. His doctoral research at Monash focused on multi-agent systems and collective decision-making by AI agents, and was nominated for the Australasian Dissertation award. He was named in Deep Knowledge Analytics' 2019 "Top 100 AI Leaders" report, and ranked fourth in the 2022 TwiLi Index of swedish scientists by social media reach.

== Industry Leadership Contributions ==
Guttmann has held vice president and senior technology roles at TietoEvry (Finland / Sweden), IBM (Australia), HP (USA), Ericsson (Sweden), and Etisalat and British Telecom (United Arab Emirates). He led multi disciplinary teams in the delivery of large client projects, e.g. for governmental organisations, hospitals and large industry clients.

Guttmann was the global head of Artificial Intelligence and Chief Artificial Intelligence and Data officer at Tietoevry. At Tietoevry, he was responsible for strategy and execution globally of Artificial Intelligence Innovation and Business.

== Professional Services ==
Alongside his academic and industry posts, Guttmann holds advisory and board roles in organisations that shape AI policy and talent development.

- Vice‑president and board member, Swedish AI Society (2014 – present).
- Non-Executive Director, Intelligent Ultrasound Group PLC (LSE-listed AI medtech company), acquired 2025 by Surgical Science (2023-2025).
- Advisory‑board member, KI Park e.V. - a German and European AI innovation centre (2022 – present).
- Jury member, “Årets AI svensk” (AI Swede of the Year) - TechSverige’s expert panel, 2020–2022.

=== Media and commentary ===
Mainstream and trade outlets have featured Guttmann’s views on scaling AI systems from lab to industry.

- Sky News spoke with him in 2023 before the UK AI Safety Summit; he argued that AI will stall unless regulators give innovators predictable guard‑rails.
- The Guardian in 2023 quoted his call for open post‑deployment audits so public projects can prove real‑world impact.
- Finnish tech monthly Tivi profiled him in 2019 on driving AI ethics at Tieto and again in 2021 on getting EU companies “from pilot to production.”
- Sweden’s Dagens Industri, Dagens industri and Svenskt Näringsliv covered his forecasts for a Nordic AI scale‑up boom in 2020 and 2021.
- MIT Sloan Management Review featured his 2018 playbook for turning R&D prototypes into enterprise platforms.

Guttmann has given keynote addresses at international AI conferences including the Rise of AI conference in Berlin, the OECD Global artnership on AI summit (Belgrade, 2024), and the Medica.AI symposium at the Champalimaud Foundation (Lisbon, 2025).

== Entrepreneurship ==
Guttmann founded and worked in several startups that use Artificial Intelligence, machine learning and natural language understanding. These startups worked in industries such as health care, finance, retail and music recommendation, including HealthiHabits, AgentArts, IVBAR and OneStone Technology. Most of the startups that Guttmann founded or led the AI technology team, were acquired by e.g. Lotus Notes (IBM) and Fast (Microsoft).

Guttmann was a Non Executive Board member of Intelligent Ultrasound Group Plc - a company in clinical ultrasound technology using Artificial Intelligence. The company provides clinicians with real-time support in classrooms and clinics with high-fidelity simulators to train clinicians, and AI image analysis software to support and guide them in the clinic.

== Non-Profit Activities ==
The Nordic Artificial Intelligence Institute (NAII) is an international and independent non-profit organisation focusing on the use of Artificial Intelligence for social and economic prosperity. The NAII is an alliance of global AI leaders, including people from countries such as the United States of America, China, Sweden, Germany, and Australia. Guttmann co-founded this institute as there is a need in understanding Artificial Intelligence in a business and societal context. The NAII support government and industry leaders in making strategic decisions on AI for societal and economic frameworks.

Guttmann actively supports awareness campaigns on cancer. One reason is that his father died of cancer.

== Research and innovation contribution ==
Guttmann is an adjunct associated professor at the University of New South Wales in Australia as an adjunct faculty member. Guttmann is currently an adjunct senior researcher at the Karolinska Institute in Sweden, he supervises PhD students and research projects in Artificial Intelligence, medical care, diagnosis and treatments, as well as health care management and services.

He has been a visiting scholar and invited speaker regarding Artificial Intelligence at several international institutes, universities, and companies, including Harvard University (USA), Stanford University (USA), Sony Research (Japan), University of Rey Juan Carlos (Spain), University of Frankfurt (Germany), University of Canterbury (New Zealand), University of Rio Grande do Sul (Porto Alegre, Brazil), British Telecom Research Laboratories (United Kingdom), University of Utrecht (Netherlands), IBM Research (China and Japan), and Hewlett Packard Laboratories (Palo Alto, USA).

Guttmann has been in many organisational and programme committees for scientific and industrial AI and Machine Learning conferences, including the International Joint Conference on Artificial Intelligence, the International Conference of Autonomous Agents and Multi Agent Systems.

His PhD research thesis work focuses on "Distributed Artificial Intelligence" related to Multi-Agent Systems. This research was nominated for the Autonomous Agent and Multi Agent Systems Award and the Australasian Dissertation Award. His PhD supervisor and intellectual role models have been Prof. Dr. Michael Georgeff, and his PhD "grand supervisor" Prof. Dr. Judea Pearl. Guttmann's Master thesis was on building a strategic decision making architecture for fully autonomous four-legged robot team - this research received a national Artificial Intelligence award by the Swedish Artificial Intelligence Society in 1999. He collaborates with other leaders in AI, such as Professor Yann LeCun (a primary driver of Convolutional Neural Networks).

Outside his professional work, Guttmann has an interest in film and has appeared in side roles.
