= DAYDREAMER =

DAYDREAMER is a goal-based agent and cognitive architecture developed at the University of California, Los Angeles by Erik T. Mueller and Michael G. Dyer beginning in 1983. The system models the human stream of thought and how it is triggered and directed by emotions, simulating human daydreaming. Taking situational descriptions as input, DAYDREAMER produces English-language daydreams as output and encodes new daydreams, plans, and planning strategies for later reuse. The program comprises five components: a scenario generator based on relaxed planning, a dynamic episodic memory, a collection of personal goals and control goals, an emotion component, and domain knowledge of interpersonal relations and everyday occurrences. The source code was released under a free software license in 2015.

== History ==
Erik Mueller began DAYDREAMER in 1983 while he was a doctoral student in the Artificial Intelligence Laboratory of the Computer Science Department at the University of California, Los Angeles, studying under Michael G. Dyer. Initial development of the project was supported by a grant from the W. M. Keck Foundation with matching funds from the UCLA School of Engineering and Applied Sciences. Additionally, Mueller was supported by an Atlantic Richfield Doctoral Fellowship and Dyer by an IBM Faculty Development Award. The first published descriptions of the program appeared in 1985 at the Ninth International Joint Conference on Artificial Intelligence in Los Angeles and at the Seventh Annual Conference of the Cognitive Science Society in Irvine. Work on the program continued, and a book, Daydreaming in Humans and Machines, was published by Ablex Publishing in 1990. The program was implemented on top of GATE, a knowledge-representation and inference substrate developed by Mueller and Uri Zernik at UCLA, and was originally written in T, a dialect of Scheme.

In 2015, Mueller released the DAYDREAMER source code, version 3.5, a Common Lisp rewrite of the original T implementation, on GitHub under the GNU General Public License version 2. The release comprised approximately 12,000 lines of Common Lisp code, along with the GATE knowledge-representation substrate on which DAYDREAMER had originally been built.

== Architecture ==
The program operates in two modes. In daydreaming mode it daydreams continuously until interrupted, while performance mode allows it to demonstrate behavior it has learned through daydreaming.

=== Emotion and control goals ===
Emotions and daydreaming form a feedback loop for DAYDREAMER. Emotions activate goals that produce daydreams, and the resulting daydreams modify existing emotions and trigger new ones, which prompt subsequent daydreaming. Recall of a goal success produces a positive emotion whereas recall of a goal failure produces a negative emotion. Emotions activate a set of goals, called control goals, which direct the course of a daydream. The program has four control goals. "Rationalization" generates reasons why an unsatisfactory outcome is in fact acceptable, in order to reduce a negative emotion and maintain self-esteem. "Revenge" is activated by anger when a failure is caused by another and reduces negative emotion through imagined retaliation. "Failure/success reversal" imagines alternative scenarios in which a failure was prevented or a success did not occur as a means of learning planning strategies for future situations. "Preparation" generates hypothetical future scenarios in order to rehearse plans and actions for events that have not yet occurred.

=== Scenario generator and relaxed planning ===
The scenario generator produces the sequence of events that make up a daydream. It operates under multiple, often conflicting personal goals rather than pursuing a single goal, applies relaxation rules that permit the generation of non-realistic scenarios, and it draws on episodic memory of past experiences both as subject matter and as a source of planning knowledge. The personal goals that guide the scenario generator include health, food, sex, friendship, love, possessions, self-esteem, social esteem, enjoyment, and achievement. These goals are organized into a goal tree that specifies their relative importance at any given time. Relaxation rules allow the program to set aside its ordinary constraints when generating a scenario. The four constraints that may be relaxed are the behavior of others, the daydreamer's own attributes, physical constraints, and social constraints. The degree of relaxation varies with the active control goal. For example a failure-reversal goal aimed at alternatives uses a low level of relaxation, whereas a revenge goal aimed at a retaliation uses a high level.

=== Episodic memory and analogy ===
DAYDREAMER's episodic memory stores its personal and vicarious experiences along with the daydreams it generates. The memory is described as dynamic because it is continually modified during daydreaming such that previously daydreamed episodes become available alongside real ones. As it daydreams, the program indexes daydreams, future plans or actions, and planning strategies into memory. Episodes are organized and retrieved using surface-level similarities, emotions, abstract themes, and Plot Units which are abstract configurations of positive and negative outcomes developed by Wendy Lehnert. A recalled episode is adapted to the current situation through analogy, which requires less effort than generating an equivalent scenario from scratch.

== Sample output ==
In the sample experience from the source code, called LOVERS1, DAYDREAMER begins from an initial situation in which it has a job, is not romantically involved, and is at home. Starting in daydreaming mode, it activates a top-level goal to be in a romantic relationship because it is not currently in one, and a positive motivating emotion of interest becomes associated with that goal. The program then activates a goal to be entertained and pursues seeing a film as a way to achieve it. Facts asserted into memory are converted to English and produced as output, such as "I want to be going out with someone" and "I have to go see a movie".

== Reception and influence ==
DAYDREAMER has been cited in research on computational models of creativity, emotion, and narrative. Linda Wills and Janet Kolodner cite the program as an example of work on opportunism in their study of serendipitous recognition in design. Joseph Bates, A. Bryan Loyall, and W. Scott Reilly of the Carnegie Mellon Oz Project cite DAYDREAMER among prior work in their description of an architecture combining action, emotion, and social behavior. Rafael Pérez y Pérez, Ricardo Sosa, and Christian Lemaitre cite Mueller's DAYDREAMER as one of the few computer models at the time to model daydreaming during the creative process. Jichen Zhu and D. Fox Harrell likewise cite the program in their work on imagining and agency in generative interactive narrative.

== See also ==
- Intelligent agent
- Interactive storytelling
