= Percept (artificial intelligence) =

Input of an intelligent agent

A percept is the input that an intelligent agent is perceiving at any given moment. It is essentially the same concept as a percept in psychology, except that it is being perceived not by the brain but by the agent. A percept is detected by a sensor, often a camera, processed accordingly, and acted upon by an actuator. Each percept is added to a "percept sequence", which is a complete history of each percept ever detected. The agent's action at any instant point may depend on the entire percept sequence up to that particular instant point. An intelligent agent chooses how to act not only based on the current percept, but the percept sequence. The next action is chosen by the agent function, which maps every percept to an action.

For example, if a camera were to record a gesture, the agent would process the percepts, calculate the corresponding spatial vectors, examine its percept history, and use the agent program (the application of the agent function) to act accordingly.

== Examples ==
Examples of percepts include inputs from touch sensors, cameras, infrared sensors, sonar, microphones, mice, and keyboards. A percept can also be a higher-level feature of the data, such as lines, depth, objects, faces, or gestures.

== See also ==
- Machine perception
