= Open Agent Architecture =

Open Agent Architecture, or OAA for short, is a framework for integrating a community of heterogeneous software agents in a distributed environment. It is also a research project of the SRI International Artificial Intelligence Center.

Roughly, the architecture is that a central "blackboard" server holds a list of tasks while a group of agents executes these tasks based on their specific capabilities.

Agents working in the structure of an OAA framework are built to universal communication and functional standards and are based on the Interagent Communication Language. The language is platform-independent and allows agents to collaborate by delegating and receiving work requests.

Open Agent Architecture was first proposed in the late 1990s and was later used as a foundation for the DARPA-funded CALO artificial intelligence project.
