= Jatni =

Jatni can refer to:

- Term for a female Jat
- Jatani or Jatni, a town in Odisha, India

== See also ==
- Jat (disambiguation)
- Jati (disambiguation)
