= Jatki =

Jatki may refer to:

- Jatki, West Pomeranian Voivodeship, village in north-western Poland
- Jatki language, several languages with the name

== See also ==
- Jat (disambiguation)
- Jatt (disambiguation)
- Rutki-Jatki, a village in north-eastern Poland
