= Belief–desire–intention model =

Model of reasoning

For popular psychology, the belief–desire–intention (BDI) model of human practical reasoning was developed by Michael Bratman as a way of explaining future-directed intention.

BDI is fundamentally reliant on folk psychology (the 'theory theory'), which is the notion that our mental models of the world are theories. It was used as a basis for developing the belief–desire–intention software model.

== Applications ==
BDI was part of the inspiration behind the BDI software architecture, which Bratman was also involved in developing. Here, the notion of intention was seen as a way of limiting time spent on deliberating about what to do, by eliminating choices inconsistent with current intentions.

BDI has also aroused some interest in psychology. BDI formed the basis for a computational model of childlike reasoning called CRIBB.
