= Jatt (disambiguation) =

Jatt may refer to:

- Jatt, Israel, a local council
- Jats, a community in Northern India and Pakistan
  - Jat Muslim, also spelt Jatt or Jutt, an ethnoreligious group and a sub-group of the Jats
  - Jat Sikh, also spelt Jatt, an ethnoreligious group and a sub-group of the Jats

== See also ==
- Jat (disambiguation)
- Jatki (disambiguation)
- Zuṭṭ, a people in medieval Arabic literature identified with the Jats
