= Jati, Ceará =

Municipality in Ceará, Brazil

Jati
- Municipality
- Flag

- Location in Ceará state

- Location in Brazil
- Coordinates: 7°41′S 39°1′W
- Country: Brazil
- Region: Northeast
- State: Ceará

Area
  - Total: 353 km^{2} (136 sq mi)

Population (2020)
  - Total: 8,130
  - Density: 23.0/km^{2} (59.7/sq mi)
- Time zone: UTC−3 (BRT)

Jati is a city in the southern part of the Brazilian state of Ceará. Its population was 8,130 (2020) and its area is 353 km².

As of October 2018, the mayor of Jati is Francisca Ferreira de Souza
