= Java Agent Template =

Java Agent Template (JAT), is a fully functional Java template, for building software agents that can communicate in a P2P distributed network over the Internet.

== See also ==
- JADE
- Cougaar
