= Autonomous agent =

Type of autonomous entity in software

An autonomous agent is an artificial intelligence (AI) system that can perform complex tasks independently.

== Definitions ==
There are various definitions of an autonomous agent. According to Brustoloni (1991):

"Autonomous agents are systems capable of autonomous, purposeful action in the real world."

According to Maes (1995):

"Autonomous agents are computational systems that inhabit some complex dynamic environment, sense and act autonomously in this environment, and by doing so realize a set of goals or tasks for which they are designed."

Franklin and Graesser (1997) review different definitions and propose their definition:

"An autonomous agent is a system situated within and a part of an environment that senses that environment and acts on it, over time, in pursuit of its own agenda and so as to effect what it senses in the future."

They explain that:

"Humans and some animals are at the high end of being an agent, with multiple, conflicting drives, multiples senses, multiple possible actions, and complex sophisticated control structures. At the low end, with one or two senses, a single action, and an absurdly simple control structure we find a thermostat."

== Applications ==
- Agentic AI systems: Advanced AI agents that can scope out projects and complete them with necessary tools, representing a significant evolution from simple task-oriented systems.
- Internet of Things (IoT) Integration: Autonomous agents increasingly interact with IoT devices, enabling smart home systems, industrial monitoring, and urban infrastructure management.
- Collaborative software development: Tools like Cognition AI's Devin aim to create autonomous software engineers capable of complex reasoning, planning, and completing engineering tasks requiring thousands of decisions.
- Enterprise automation: Business process automation platforms like Salesforce's Agentforce provide autonomous bots for various service functions.

=== Autonomous robots ===
An autonomous robot is a robot that acts without recourse to human control. Historic examples include space probes. Modern examples include self-driving vacuums and cars.

Industrial robot arms that work on assembly lines inside factories may also be considered autonomous robots, though their autonomy is restricted due to a highly structured environment and their inability to locomote.

== Challenges and considerations ==
- Uncertainty and incomplete information: Autonomous agents must make decisions with limited or uncertain information about their environment and future states.
- Integration complexity: Incorporating autonomous agents into existing systems and workflows can be technically challenging and resource-intensive.
- Scalability: As systems become more complex and more agents are used, maintaining coordination and avoiding conflicts becomes increasingly difficult.
- Trust: Research has shown that the combination of external appearance and internal autonomous capabilities significantly impacts human reactions and trust. Lee et al. (2015) found that human-like appearance and high levels of autonomy are strongly correlated with social presence, intelligence, safety, and trustworthiness perceptions. Specifically, appearance impacts affective trust most significantly, while autonomy affects both affective and cognitive trust domains, where affective trust is emotionally driven, and cognitive trust is characterized by knowledge-based factors.
- Vulnerability to manipulation: Researchers from Harvard, MIT, and other educational institutions found that AI agents could become vulnerable to manipulation and could perform detrimental actions in the process of being helpful.

== Ethical and regulatory concerns ==
- Accountability: Determining responsibility when autonomous agents make incorrect or harmful decisions remains a complex issue.
- Privacy and security: autonomous agents often require access to sensitive data, raising concerns about data protection and system security.

== See also ==
- Actor model
- AI agent
- Agent verification
- Ambient intelligence
- AutoGPT
- Autonomous agency theory
- Chatbot
- Embodied agent
- Intelligent control
- Multi-agent system
- Software agent
