= Intelligent agent =

Software agent which acts autonomously

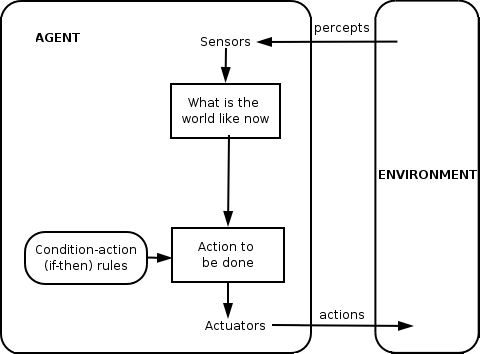
Simple reflex agent diagram

An intelligent agent is an entity that perceives its environment, takes actions autonomously to achieve goals, and may improve its performance through by acquiring knowledge. Intelligent agents can range from simple to highly complex. A basic thermostat or control system is considered an intelligent agent, as is a human being, or any other system that meets the same criteria—such as a firm, a state, or a biome.

In artificial intelligence, a specialized subset of intelligent agents, AI agents (also known as agentic AI) expand this concept by proactively pursuing goals, making decisions, and taking actions over extended periods.

Intelligent agents operate based on an objective function, which encapsulates their goals. They are designed to create and execute plans that maximize the expected value of this function upon completion. For example, a reinforcement learning agent has a reward function, which allows programmers to shape its desired behavior. Similarly, an evolutionary algorithm's behavior is guided by a fitness function.

Intelligent agents in artificial intelligence are closely related to agents in economics, and versions of the intelligent agent paradigm are studied in cognitive science, ethics, and the philosophy of practical reason, as well as in many interdisciplinary socio-cognitive modeling and computer social simulations.

Intelligent agents are often described schematically as abstract functional systems similar to computer programs. To distinguish theoretical models from real-world implementations, abstract descriptions of intelligent agents are called abstract intelligent agents. Intelligent agents are also closely related to software agents—autonomous computer programs that carry out tasks on behalf of users. They are also referred to using a term borrowed from economics: a "rational agent".

== Agent-based definition of artificial intelligence ==
Russell and Norvig describe artificial intelligence as the study of agents that receive percepts from an environment and perform actions. In this framework, an agent is anything that perceives its environment through sensors and acts upon that environment through actuators. A rational agent selects the action expected to maximize its performance measure, given its percept sequence, prior knowledge, and available actions. Rationality in this sense does not require an agent to be omniscient or always successful; it concerns the expected outcome of an action on the basis of the information available to the agent.

In agent-oriented computing, agents are also commonly characterized by properties such as autonomy, responsiveness to changes in their environment, and goal-directed or proactive behavior. One approach to modeling practical reasoning is the belief–desire–intention (BDI) architecture, which represents an agent in terms of its information about the world, its objectives, and the courses of action to which it has committed.

== Objective function ==
An objective function (or goal function) specifies the goals of an intelligent agent. An agent is deemed more intelligent if it consistently selects actions that yield outcomes better aligned with its objective function. In effect, the objective function serves as a measure of success.

The objective function may be:

- Simple: For example, in a game of Go, the objective function might assign a value of 1 for a win and 0 for a loss.
- Complex: It might require the agent to evaluate and learn from past actions, adapting its behavior based on patterns that have proven effective.

The objective function encapsulates all of the goals the agent is designed to achieve. For rational agents, it also incorporates the trade-offs between potentially conflicting goals. For instance, a self-driving car's objective function might balance factors such as safety, speed, and passenger comfort.

Different terms are used to describe this concept, depending on the context. These include:

- Utility function: Often used in economics and decision theory, representing the desirability of a state.
- Objective function: A general term used in optimization.
- Loss function: Typically used in machine learning, where the goal is to minimize the loss (error).
- Reward function: Used in reinforcement learning.
- Fitness function: Used in evolutionary systems.

Goals, and therefore the objective function, can be:

- Explicitly defined: Programmed directly into the agent.
- Induced: Learned or evolved over time.
  - In reinforcement learning, a "reward function" provides feedback, encouraging desired behaviors and discouraging undesirable ones. The agent learns to maximize its cumulative reward.
  - In evolutionary systems, a "fitness function" determines which agents are more likely to reproduce. This is analogous to natural selection, where organisms evolve to maximize their chances of survival and reproduction.

Some AI systems, such as nearest-neighbor, reason by analogy rather than being explicitly goal-driven. However, even these systems can have goals implicitly defined within their training data. Such systems can still be benchmarked by framing the non-goal system as one whose "goal" is to accomplish its narrow classification task.

Systems not traditionally considered agents, like knowledge-representation systems, are sometimes included in the paradigm by framing them as agents with a goal of, for example, answering questions accurately. Here, the concept of an "action" is extended to encompass the "act" of providing an answer. As a further extension, mimicry-driven systems can be framed as agents optimizing a "goal function" based on how closely the agent mimics the desired behavior. In generative adversarial networks (GANs) of the 2010s, an "encoder"/"generator" component attempts to mimic and improvise human text composition. The generator tries to maximize a function representing how well it can fool an antagonistic "predictor"/"discriminator" component.

While symbolic AI systems often use an explicit goal function, the paradigm also applies to neural networks and evolutionary computing. Reinforcement learning can generate intelligent agents that appear to act in ways intended to maximize a "reward function". Sometimes, instead of setting the reward function directly equal to the desired benchmark evaluation function, machine learning programmers use reward shaping to initially give the machine rewards for incremental progress. Yann LeCun stated in 2018, "Most of the learning algorithms that people have come up with essentially consist of minimizing some objective function." AlphaZero chess had a simple objective function: +1 point for each win, and -1 point for each loss. A self-driving car's objective function would be more complex. Evolutionary computing can evolve intelligent agents that appear to act in ways intended to maximize a "fitness function" influencing how many descendants each agent is allowed to leave.

The mathematical formalism of AIXI was proposed as a maximally intelligent agent in this paradigm. However, AIXI is uncomputable. In the real world, an intelligent agent is constrained by finite time and hardware resources, and scientists compete to produce algorithms that achieve progressively higher scores on benchmark tests with existing hardware.

== Agent function ==
An intelligent agent's behavior can be described mathematically by an agent function. This function determines what the agent does based on what it has seen.

A percept refers to the agent's sensory inputs at a single point in time. For example, a self-driving car's percepts might include camera images, lidar data, GPS coordinates, and speed readings at a specific instant. The agent uses these percepts, and potentially its history of percepts, to decide on its next action (e.g., accelerate, brake, turn).

The agent function, often denoted as f, maps the agent's entire history of percepts to an action.

Mathematically, this can be represented as

$$f\colon P^{*} \rightarrow A,$$

where:

- $\boldsymbol{P^{*}}$ represents the set of all possible percept sequences (the agent's entire perceptual history). The asterisk (*) indicates a sequence of zero or more percepts.
- $\boldsymbol{A}$ represents the set of all possible actions the agent can take.
- $\boldsymbol{f}$ is the agent function that maps a percept sequence to an action.

It is crucial to distinguish between the agent function (an abstract mathematical concept) and the agent program (the concrete implementation of that function).

- The agent function is a theoretical description.
- The agent program is the actual code that runs on the agent. The agent program takes the current percept as input and produces an action as output.

The agent function can incorporate a wide range of decision-making approaches, including:

- Calculating the utility (desirability) of different actions.
- Using logical rules and deduction.
- Employing fuzzy logic.
- Other methods.

== Classes of intelligent agents ==
=== Russell and Norvig's classification ===
Russell & Norvig (2003) group agents into five classes based on their degree of perceived intelligence and capability:

==== Simple reflex agents ====
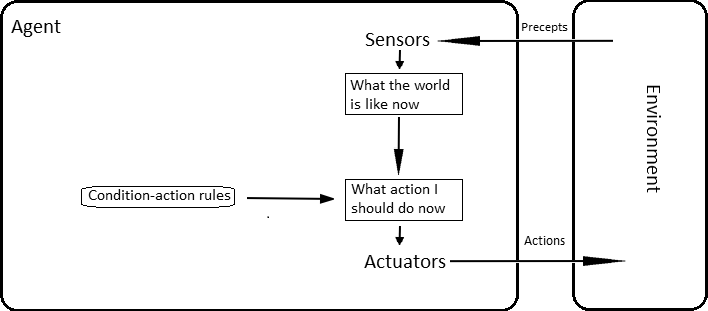
Simple reflex agent

Simple reflex agents act only on the basis of the current percept, ignoring the rest of the percept history. The agent function is based on the condition-action rule: "if condition, then action".

This agent function only succeeds when the environment is fully observable. Some reflex agents can also contain information on their current state which allows them to disregard conditions whose actuators are already triggered.

Infinite loops are often unavoidable for simple reflex agents operating in partially observable environments. If the agent can randomize its actions, it may be possible to escape from infinite loops.

A home thermostat, which turns on or off when the temperature drops below a certain point, is an example of a simple reflex agent.

==== Model-based reflex agents ====
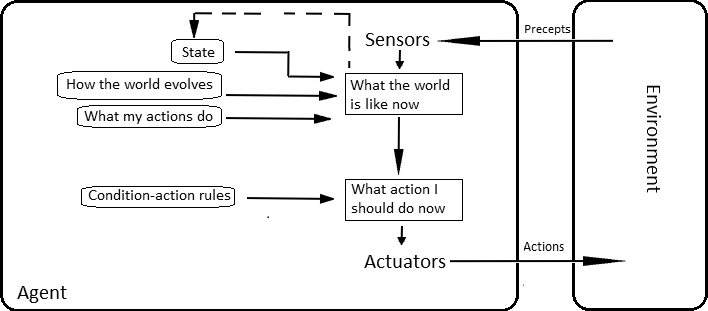
Model-based reflex agent

A model-based agent can handle partially observable environments. Its current state is stored inside the agent, maintaining a structure that describes the part of the world which cannot be seen. This knowledge about "how the world works" is referred to as a model of the world, hence the name "model-based agent".

A model-based reflex agent should maintain some sort of internal model that depends on the percept history and thereby reflects at least some of the unobserved aspects of the current state. Percept history and impact of action on the environment can be determined by using the internal model. It then chooses an action in the same way as reflex agent.

An agent may also use models to describe and predict the behaviors of other agents in the environment.

==== Goal-based agents ====
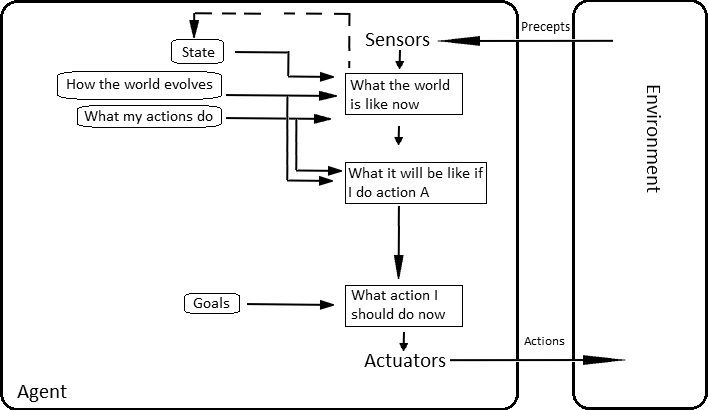
Model-based, goal-based agent

Goal-based agents further expand on the capabilities of the model-based agents, by using "goal" information. Goal information describes situations that are desirable. This provides the agent a way to choose among multiple possibilities, selecting the one which reaches a goal state. Search and planning are the subfields of artificial intelligence devoted to finding action sequences that achieve the agent's goals.

ChatGPT and the Roomba vacuum are examples of goal-based agents.

==== Utility-based agents ====
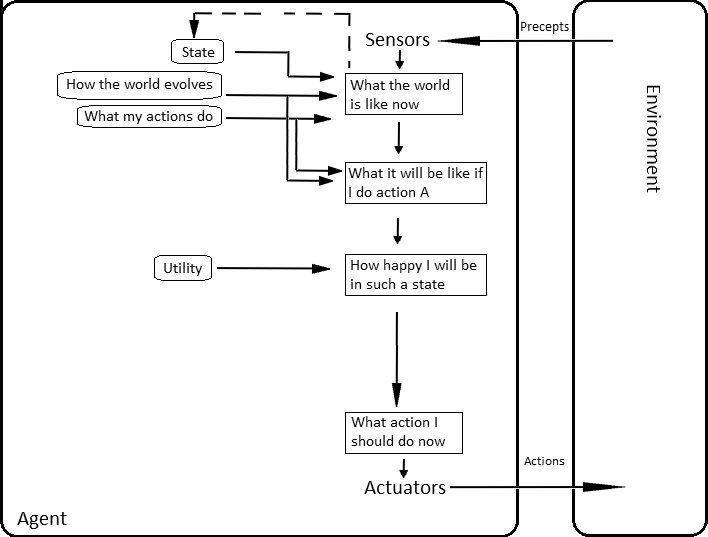
Model-based, utility-based agent

Goal-based agents only distinguish between goal states and non-goal states. It is also possible to define a measure of how desirable a particular state is. This measure can be obtained through the use of a utility function which maps a state to a measure of the utility of the state. A more general performance measure should allow a comparison of different world states according to how well they satisfied the agent's goals. The term utility can be used to describe how "happy" the agent is.

A rational utility-based agent chooses the action that maximizes the expected utility of the action outcomes - that is, what the agent expects to derive, on average, given the probabilities and utilities of each outcome. A utility-based agent has to model and keep track of its environment, tasks that have involved a great deal of research on perception, representation, reasoning, and learning.

==== Learning agents ====
A general learning agent

Learning lets agents begin in unknown environments and gradually surpass the bounds of their initial knowledge. A key distinction in such agents is the separation between a "learning element," responsible for improving performance, and a "performance element," responsible for choosing external actions.

The learning element gathers feedback from a "critic" to assess the agent's performance and decides how the performance element—also called the "actor"—can be adjusted to yield better outcomes. The performance element, once considered the entire agent, interprets percepts and takes actions.

The final component, the "problem generator," suggests new and informative experiences that encourage exploration and further improvement.

=== Weiss's classification ===
According to Weiss (2013), agents can be categorized into four classes:

- Logic-based agents, where decisions about actions are derived through logical deduction.
- Reactive agents, where decisions occur through a direct mapping from situation to action.
- Belief–desire–intention agents, where decisions depend on manipulating data structures that represent the agent's beliefs, desires, and intentions.
- Layered architectures, where decision-making takes place across multiple software layers, each of which reasons about the environment at a different level of abstraction.

=== Other ===
In 2013, Alexander Wissner-Gross published a theory exploring the relationship between freedom and intelligence in intelligent agents.

== Hierarchies of agents ==
Intelligent agents can be organized hierarchically into multiple "sub-agents." These sub-agents handle lower-level functions, and together with the main agent, they form a complete system capable of executing complex tasks and achieving challenging goals.

Typically, an agent is structured by dividing it into sensors and actuators. The perception system gathers input from the environment via the sensors and feeds this information to a central controller, which then issues commands to the actuators. Often, a multilayered hierarchy of controllers is necessary to balance the rapid responses required for low-level tasks with the more deliberative reasoning needed for high-level objectives.

== Alternative definitions and uses ==
"Intelligent agent" is also often used as a vague term, sometimes synonymous with "virtual personal assistant". Some 20th-century definitions characterize an agent as a program that aids a user or that acts on behalf of a user. These examples are known as software agents, and sometimes an "intelligent software agent" (that is, a software agent with intelligence) is referred to as an "intelligent agent".

According to Nikola Kasabov in 1998, intelligent agent systems should exhibit the following characteristics:

- Accommodate new problem solving rules incrementally.
- Adapt online and in real time.
- Are able to analyze themselves in terms of behavior, error and success.
- Learn and improve through interaction with the environment (embodiment).
- Learn quickly from large amounts of data.
- Have memory-based exemplar storage and retrieval capacities.
- Have parameters to represent short- and long-term memory, age, forgetting, etc.

=== Agentic AI ===
AI agents do not have a standard definition. In the context of generative AI, AI agents (also called compound AI systems) are a class of intelligent agents distinguished by their ability to operate autonomously in complex environments. Agentic AI tools prioritize decision-making over content creation and do not require human prompts or continuous oversight. Agents may include memory systems for remembering previous user-agent interactions and orchestration software for organizing agent components.

The concept of agentic AI has been compared to the fictional character J.A.R.V.I.S..

A common application of AI agents is the automation of tasks—for example, booking travel plans based on a user's prompted request.

== Applications ==
The concept of agent-based modeling for self-driving cars was discussed as early as 2003. Hallerbach et al. explored the use of agent-based approaches for developing and validating automated driving systems. Their method involved a digital twin of the vehicle under test and microscopic traffic simulations using independent agents. Waymo developed a multi-agent simulation environment called Carcraft, to test algorithms for self-driving cars. This system simulates interactions between human drivers, pedestrians, and automated vehicles. Artificial agents replicate human behavior using real-world data.

Salesforce's Agentforce is an agentic AI platform that allows for the building of autonomous agents to perform tasks. The Transport Security Administration is integrating agentic AI into new technologies, including machines to authenticate passenger identities using biometrics and photos, and also for incident response. In March 2026, Amazon Web Services launched Amazon Connect Health, its first HIPAA-eligible AI agent platform for healthcare, designed to automate administrative workflows including appointment scheduling, clinical documentation, and patient verification for healthcare providers.

== See also ==
- AI agent
- AI effect
- Ambient intelligence
- Artificial conversational entity
- Artificial intelligence systems integration
- Autonomous agent
- Cognitive architectures
- Cognitive radio – a practical field for implementation
- Cybernetics
- DAYDREAMER
- Embodied agent
- Federated search – the ability for agents to search heterogeneous data sources using a single vocabulary
- Friendly artificial intelligence
- Fuzzy agents – IA implemented with adaptive fuzzy logic
- GOAL agent programming language
- Hybrid intelligent system
- Intelligent control
- JACK Intelligent Agents
- Reinforcement learning
- Semantic Web – making data on the Web available for automated processing by agents
- Social simulation
- Software bot
- Software agent

== Sources ==
- Domingos, Pedro (September 22, 2015). The Master Algorithm: How the Quest for the Ultimate Learning Machine Will Remake Our World. Basic Books. ISBN 978-0-465-06570-7.
- Russell, Stuart J.; Norvig, Peter (2003). Artificial Intelligence: A Modern Approach (2nd ed.). Upper Saddle River, New Jersey: Prentice Hall. Chapter 2. ISBN 0-13-790395-2.
- Kasabov, N. (1998). "Introduction: Hybrid intelligent adaptive systems". International Journal of Intelligent Systems. 13 (6): 453–454. doi:10.1002/(SICI)1098-111X(199806)13:6<453::AID-INT1>3.0.CO;2-K. S2CID 120318478.
- Weiss, G. (2013). Multiagent systems (2nd ed.). Cambridge, MA: MIT Press. ISBN 978-0-262-01889-0.
