= History of rail transport in Philadelphia =

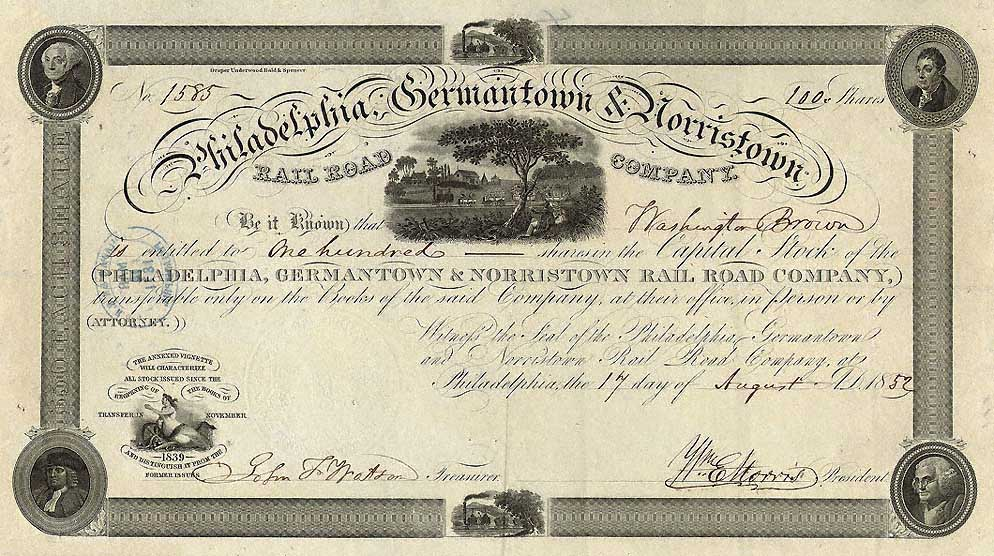
A Philadelphia, Germantown and Norristown Railroad stock certificate from 1852

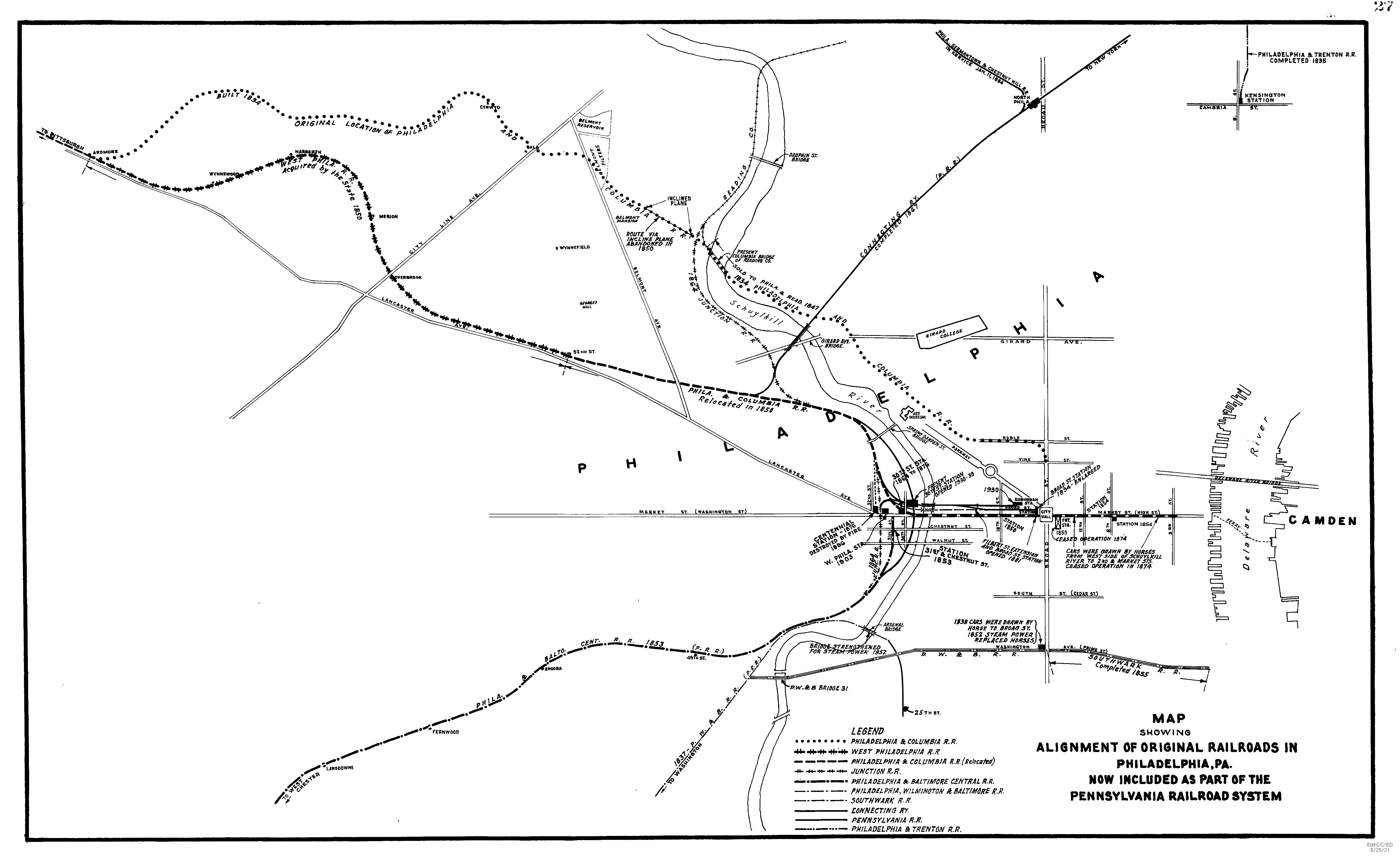
Early Philadelphia railroads up to 1948

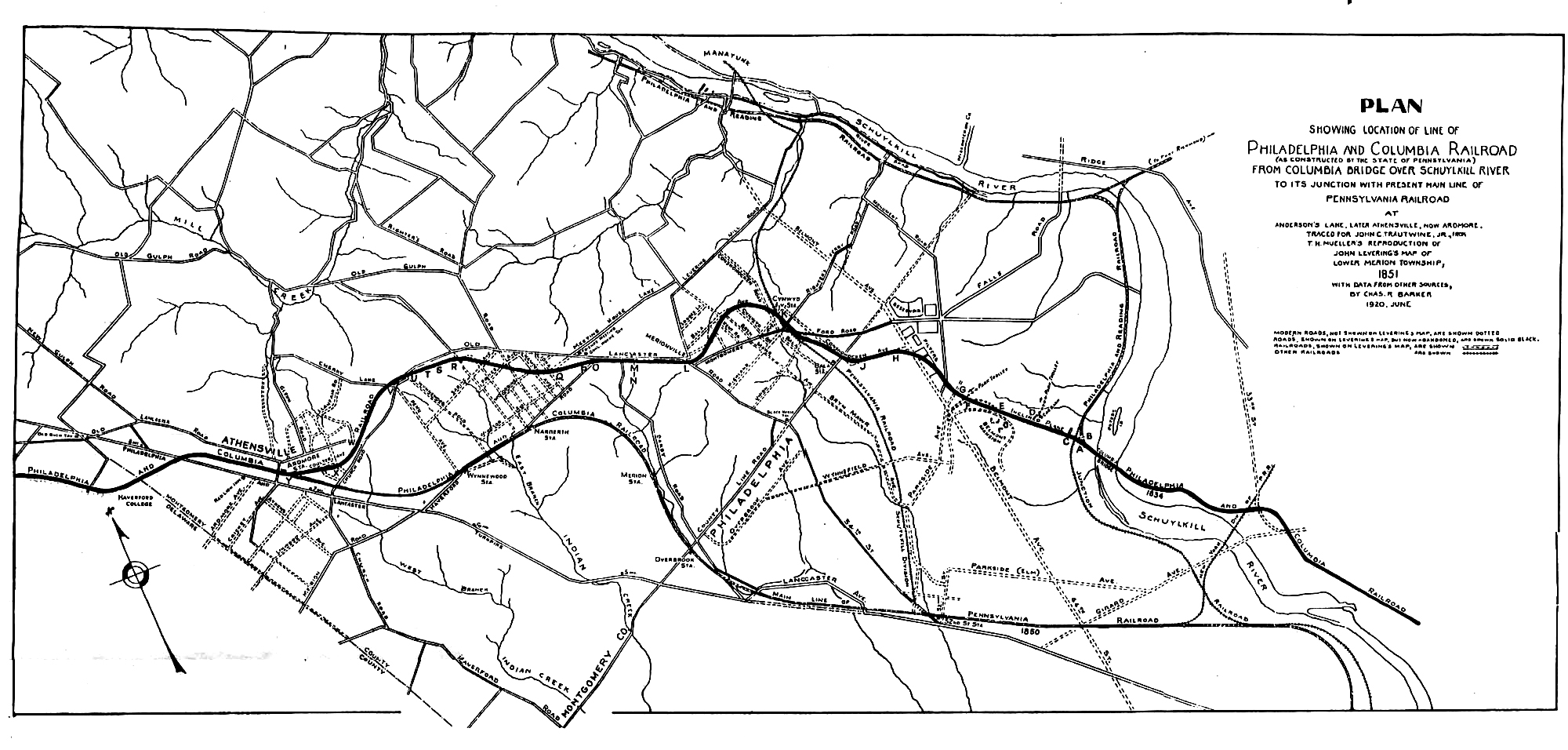
A 1920 map of the Philadelphia and Columbia Railroad

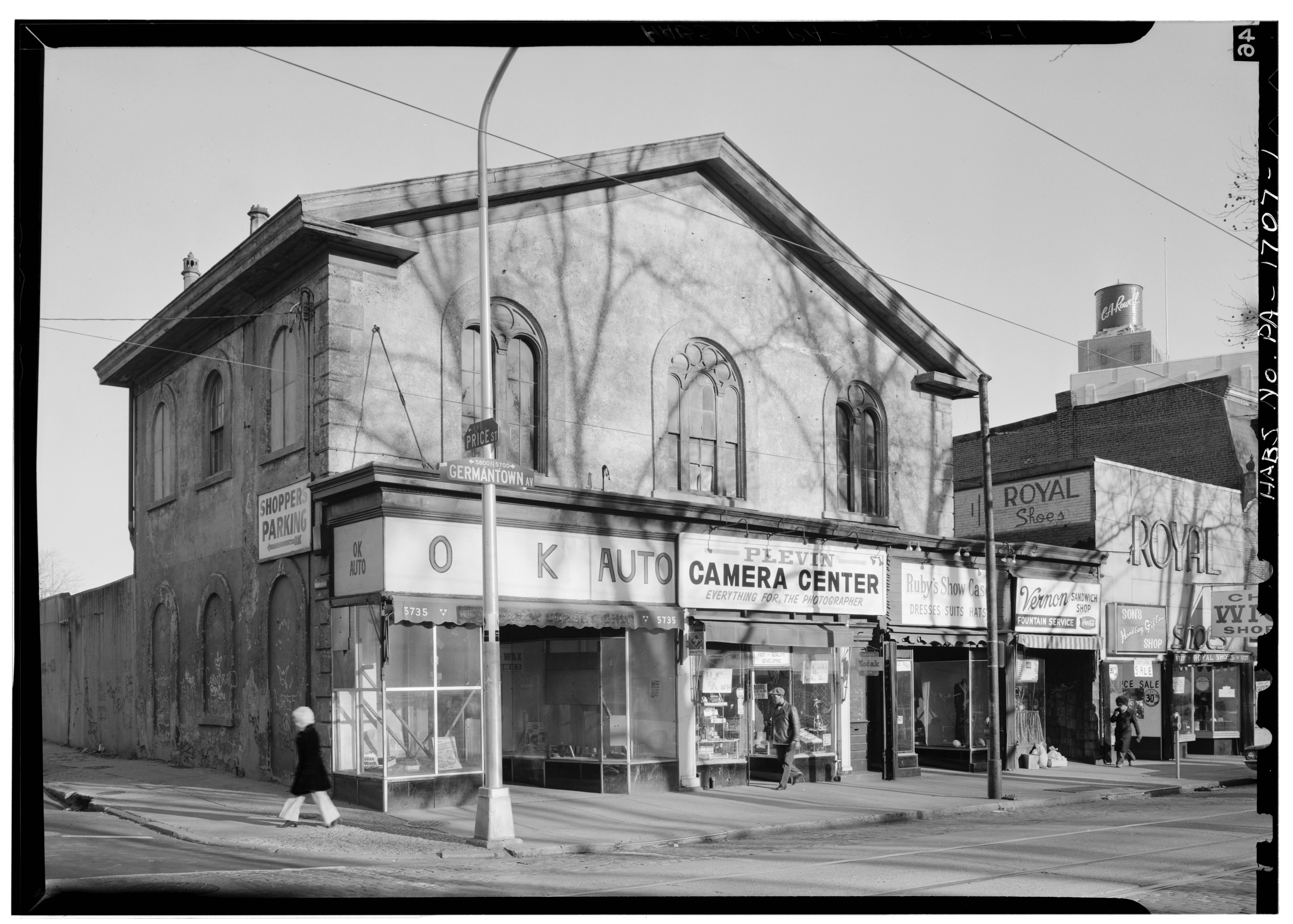
Germantown Depot

Philadelphia was an early railroad hub, with lines from all over meeting in Philadelphia. The first railroad in Philadelphia was the Philadelphia, Germantown and Norristown Railroad, opened in 1832 north to Germantown. At the end of 1833, the state-built Philadelphia and Columbia Railroad, part of the Main Line of Public Works, opened for travel to the west, built to avoid loss of travel through Pennsylvania due to projects such as the Erie Canal. At the same time, the north-south leg of the Philadelphia City Railroad opened, running south along Broad Street from the Philadelphia and Columbia.

The Northern Liberties and Penn Township Railroad opened in 1834, connecting the Philadelphia and Columbia to the Delaware River north of downtown, and later that year the Southwark Rail-Road opened, connecting the south end of the City Railroad to the river. The Philadelphia and Trenton Railroad also opened in late 1834, running north to Trenton, New Jersey, as did the Camden and Amboy Railroad, running from Camden, New Jersey, across the Delaware River, to South Amboy with connections across Raritan Bay to New York City. The Philadelphia and Trenton would try but never succeed in getting closer to downtown than Kensington, making the C&A the main line to Philadelphia for many years.

In 1837, an eastern extension of the Philadelphia City Railroad opened along Market Street to the Delaware River at Dock Street. The Philadelphia, Wilmington and Baltimore Railroad opened in 1838 to Grays Ferry and later that year into downtown via a connection with the Southwark and City Railroads. The Philadelphia and Reading Railroad opened in 1839, using the Philadelphia and Columbia and City Railroads to reach downtown. In 1847 a branch of the Philadelphia and Trenton Railroad to the Tacony section of Philadelphia opened, allowing a transfer to steamboats at Tacony for a connection to downtown.

A relocation of the Philadelphia and Columbia Railroad to bypass the Belmont Plane opened in late 1850, and soon after that a western extension of the City Railroad opened to meet it. In 1851, the old route closed, and the eastern section, used only by the Philadelphia and Reading Railroad, was sold to them.

In 1853, the West Chester and Philadelphia Railroad opened, heading southwest and west to West Chester. The first section of the North Pennsylvania Railroad, eventually running north to Bethlehem, opened in 1855. A new alignment of the Philadelphia, Wilmington and Baltimore Railroad opened in 1872, and the old one was leased in 1873 to the Philadelphia and Reading Railway. In 1886, the Baltimore and Philadelphia Railroad opened, giving the Baltimore and Ohio Railroad its own route into Philadelphia.

In 1863 and 1866 the Junction Railroad opened, connecting the lines west of downtown. The Connecting Railway opened in 1867, connecting the lines north of downtown, and finally giving the Philadelphia and Trenton Railroad a route into downtown. Eventually all the lines into Philadelphia, except for the Baltimore and Ohio Railroad's Baltimore and Philadelphia Railroad, were owned by the Pennsylvania Railroad or Philadelphia and Reading Railway.

The Schuylkill River starts in Schuylkill County, Pennsylvania near Pottsville, Pennsylvania and was used in the early days to ship anthracite coal by mule on the Schuylkill Canal to Philadelphia for burning fuel. Later anthracite coal from the hard Coal Region was shipped on the Reading railroad/ Reading Company. The Reading Railroad competed with the Pennsylvania railroad and built tracks along the Schuylkill River for the coal. As of 2016, the anthracite coal was still shipped on coal cars down to the ports of Philadelphia from Schuylkill County, Pennsylvania, by rail. The city of Reading, Pennsylvania, became a rich middleman town during the Industrial revolution from the Coal Region Pottsville, Pennsylvania, 150 miles (240 km) northwest of Philadelphia.
