= ZEVS =

Zevs or ZEVS may refer to:

- Zevs (artist), a French street artist
- ZEVS (transmitter), a Soviet/Russian submarine communication system
- Zeus , the king of gods in Greek mythology

== See also ==
- Zeus (disambiguation)
