= Delaware Extension =

Overview
- Termini: Philadelphia, Pennsylvania, U.S.

History
- Opened: 1862 (Pennsylvania Railroad), 1968 (Penn Central), 1976 (Conrail)
- Closed: 1968 (Pennsylvania Railroad), 1976 (Penn Central), unknown (Conrail, became part of Harrisburg Line)

Technical
- Line length: 9.5 mi (15.3 km)
- Track gauge: 1,435 mm (4 ft 8 1/2 in) standard gauge

The Delaware Extension was a rail line owned and operated by the Pennsylvania Railroad in Philadelphia, Pennsylvania.

The line ran from Arsenal Interlocking in West Philadelphia southeast, south, east and north to the intersection of Delaware Avenue (now Columbus Boulevard) and Dock Street. It met the West Philadelphia Elevated at Arsenal, crossed the Schuylkill River on the Arsenal Bridge, intersected with the Washington Avenue Branch, Girard Point Branch, Swanson Street Branch (twice), and Washington Avenue Branch again in South Philadelphia, and became the Delaware Avenue Branch at Dock Street.

The line from Arsenal to Greenwich Yard on the Delaware River is now part of CSX Transportation's Harrisburg Subdivision. From Greenwich Yard north to Dock Street, the line is owned by the Philadelphia Belt Line Railroad and used by both CSX and the Norfolk Southern Railway under Conrail trackage rights.

== History ==
Construction began on the first piece of the line, from Arsenal (then on the West Chester and Philadelphia Railroad) over the Arsenal Bridge to Washington Avenue west of 25th Street (then on the Philadelphia, Wilmington and Baltimore Railroad's main line), in 1860. The PRR acquired trackage rights over the WC&P from their main line at Market Street south to Arsenal in exchange for building a second track to handle the increased traffic. The PRR also gained trackage rights over the PW&B and their leased Southwark Rail-Road to the foot of Washington Avenue at the Delaware River, and the line opened on January 27, 1862; the PW&B was allowed to use the Arsenal Bridge as part of the agreement. The PRR began using the new Junction Railroad rather than the WC&P on August 12, 1866.

The first extension, south on 25th Street to Long Lane (Point Breeze Avenue) and then southwest to the Philadelphia Gas Works at Point Breeze, opened on January 27, 1863. It was extended further south along 25th Street and east along the current Schuylkill Expressway alignment to the Delaware River at Greenwich Point in March 1866, giving the PRR its own port. In July or August 1874, it was extended north along Delaware Avenue (Columbus Boulevard) to a new freight station at Dock Street, replacing the PRR's use of the City Railroad along Market Street.

The line passed to Penn Central Transportation in 1968, Conrail in 1976, and was assigned to CSX Transportation in 1999, becoming part of their Harrisburg Subdivision.
