= Zeus (comics) =

Zeus, in comics, may refer to:

- Zeus (Marvel Comics)
- Zeus (DC Comics)

== See also ==
- Zeus (disambiguation)
