= Zo =

Zo or ZO may refer to:

== Arts and entertainment ==
- Kamen Rider ZO, a 1993 Japanese tokusatsu movie
- Zo (album), a 1993 album by jazz pianist Matthew Shipp
- ZO (Yung Fazo album), 2025

== Ethnography ==
- Zo people, a group of indigenous tribes in Burma and northeast India
  - Zou people, one of those tribes
  - Zo language, the language spoken by the Zo people
  - Zogam or Zoland, the land of Zo people, also Chin State, Mizoram State, Manipur State, and Nagaland

== People ==
- Achille Zo (1826–1901), French painter
- Alonzo Mourning (born 1970), American retired National Basketball Association player
- Elżbieta Zawacka (1909–2009), code name Zo, Polish professor, scouting instructor, SOE agent and WWII freedom fighter
- Lonzo Ball, (born 1997), National Basketball Association player for the Chicago Bulls
- Lorenzo Charles (1963-2011), American basketball player
- Mat Zo (born 1990), UK trance artist
- Zo d'Axa, (1864–1930), French journalist, writer, and adventurer

== Other uses ==
- Zo (bot), artificial intelligence chatbot developed by Microsoft
- ZO sex-determination system, chromosomal system in biology determining the sex of some moth species
  - ZO, heterogametic female designation under this system
- Renault Zo, a car introduced in 1998
- Zionist Organization, former name of the World Zionist Organization
- Zone occupée, the partition of France occupied by German troops during the initial years of World War II

== See also ==
- Zo'é language, a language originating in Brazil
- Dzo, a male hybrid of a yak and a domesticated cow
- Zoo (disambiguation)
- Zou (disambiguation)
