= Zoo (disambiguation) =

A zoo (shortened form of "zoological garden") is a place where a variety of animals are exhibited.

Zoo may also refer to:

== Places ==
- The Zoo, a nickname for Kalamazoo, Michigan
- Zoo Junction, a major railroad junction in Philadelphia
- Zoo station (disambiguation), several railway stations

== Art, entertainment, and media ==
=== Films ===
- A Zed & Two Noughts (also known as Zoo and Z00), a 1985 film by Peter Greenaway
- Zoo, a 1961 documentary film by Bert Haanstra
- Zoo, a 1999 dark comedy with David Carradine
- Zoo (2005 film), a Japanese portmanteau film based on short stories by Otsuichi
- Zoo (2007 film), a documentary about the life and death of Kenneth Pinyan
- Postcards from the Zoo (also known as Zoo), a 2012 film by Edwin
- Zoo (2017 film), a film by Colin McIvor
- Zoo (2018 film), a Hindi-language drama film directed by Shlok Sharma

=== Literature ===
- Zoo (MacNeice book), a non-fiction book by Louis MacNeice
- Zoo (Patterson novel), a 2012 novel by James Patterson and Michael Ledwidge
- Zoo (Vidmar novel), a 2005 Slovenian novel by Janja Vidmar
- The Zoo Story, a play by Edward Albee

=== Music ===
==== Groups and labels ====
- The Zoo (American band), a band formed by Mike Flicker and Howard Leese in the 1960s
- The Zoo (Filipino band), an indie rock band from the Philippines
- Zoo (Japanese band), a J-pop band from the early 1990s
- Zoo (Norwegian band), a Norwegian band active in the late 70s and early 80s
- Zoo Entertainment (record label), an American independent record label formed in the early 1990s, now defunct
- Zoo Music, an American independent record label founded by Dee Dee Penny of the Dum Dum Girls
- Zoo Records, a British independent record label formed in 1978

==== Recordings ====
- Zoo (Ceremony album), 2012
- Zoo (Russ album), 2018
- "The Zoo" (song), by Scorpions, 1980
- "Zoo" (Red Velvet song), 2017
- "Zoo" (Shakira song), 2025
- "Zoo", a song by Fetty Wap and Tee Grizzley, 2019
- "Zoo", a song by Alphaville from CrazyShow, 2003
- "Zoo", a song by the Legendary Pink Dots from Nemesis Online, 1998
- "Zoo", a song by SM Town from 2021 Winter SM Town: SMCU Express, 2021
- "Zoo", a song by Winner from We, 2019
- "The Zoo (The Human Zoo)", a song by the Commodores from Machine Gun, 1974

=== Periodicals ===
- Zoo Magazine, a German magazine
- Zoo Weekly, formerly Zoo, a men's magazine in the United Kingdom, Australia and South Africa

=== Television ===
- Zoo (American TV series), 2015 television adaptation of James Patterson's novel
- Zoo (Czech TV series), a 2022 Czech family, comedy and relationship TV series
- Our Zoo, a British drama television series
- The Zoo (British TV series), a British television series airing on CBBC
- The Zoo (Australian TV series), an Australian television series
- The Zoo (New Zealand TV series), a New Zealand television series
- The Zoo, an Animal Planet docu-series about the Bronx Zoo
- "Zoo", an episode of the Australian animated television series Bluey
- "Zoo", a season 4 episode of Servant (TV series)

=== Other arts, entertainment, and media ===
- Morning zoo, a format of off-beat morning radio
- ZOO, a dance company in Brussels, Belgium, led by Thomas Hauert
- Zoo, a brand used for events organised by the Oxford University Student Union
- Zoo (dance troupe), British Top of the Pops dance troupe in the 1980s
- The Zoo, a comic opera by Arthur Sullivan
- The Zoo, Brisbane, a former music venue in Brisbane, Australia

== Businesses and organizations ==
- Zoo Entertainment (video game company), an American video game publisher
- Zoo Corporation, a Japanese video game and medical equipment developer and publisher
- Zoo Outreach Organisation (ZOO), an Indian non-governmental organization
- United States Air Force Academy, nicknamed The Zoo or The Blue Zoo

== Technology ==
- SPAAG ZSU-23-4, a Soviet self-propelled anti-aircraft gun, nicknamed "zoo" by US soldiers
- Zoo (file format), a 1980s archive file format developed by Rahul Dhesi

== Other uses ==
- Asunción Mixtepec Zapotec (ISO 639-3 language code "zoo")
- Saugeen–Maitland Hall, at the University of Western Ontario in London, Ontario, Canada
- Zoo (Anthrocon), an informal meeting place at the Anthrocon convention

== See also ==
- List of zoos
- Zeus (disambiguation)
- Zo (disambiguation)
- Zoology (disambiguation)
