= Market Street Tunnel =

Market Street Tunnel may refer to:

- Market Street subway, carrying Bay Area Rapid Transit (BART) and Muni light rail under Market Street, San Francisco
- Market Street Tunnel, part of the Market–Frankford Line in Philadelphia, crosses the former Junction Railroad
- Market Street Tunnel, part of the Junction Railroad in Philadelphia, and crosses the Market–Frankford Line
- Center City Commuter Connection, carrying commuter rail trains a block north of Market Street in Philadelphia
