= Zeus (disambiguation) =

Zeus is a Greek god, the ruler of Mount Olympus and the king of the gods.

Zeus or Zeuss may also refer to:

== Entertainment ==
=== Comics and manga ===
- Zeus (DC Comics), a portrayal of the god in the DC Comics universe
- Zeus (Marvel Comics), a portrayal of the god in the Marvel Comics universe
- Zeus the Great God, a shonen manga Saint Seiya
- Zeus, is king of gods and one fighter in Record of Ragnarok

=== Film and television ===
- Zeus Carver, a character in the 1995 American action film Die Hard with a Vengeance (played by Samuel L. Jackson)
- Zeus Network, a streaming service

=== Music ===
- Zeus (band), a Canadian indie rock band
- Zeus!, an Italian math rock band
- Zeus (EP), an EP by British Sea Power
- "Zeus" (song), a song by Eminem

=== Video games ===
- Zeus (gamer), South Korean professional League of Legends player
- Zeus: Master of Olympus, a computer game
- Zeus Kerauno, a game and anime portray in Kamigami no Asobi
- Lord Zeus (Kami-sama in JP), a support deities in Kid Icarus, Nintendo series
- Zeus, a video game character and antagonist in the God of War PlayStation series
- Zeus, a video game character and narrator in Ubisoft’s Immortals Fenyx Rising

=== Wrestling ===
- Zeus (American wrestler), American actor and former professional wrestler
- Zeus (Japanese wrestler), Japanese professional wrestler

== Computing ==
- ZEUS (multi-agent system), an agent development toolkit
- Zeus (malware)
- Zeus Technology, a software company
  - Zeus Web Server, a web server developed by Zeus Technology
- Zilog Enhanced Unix System, the operating system of a Zilog Z8000 based computer

== Technology and transportation ==
- Zeus (particle detector)
- Spartan 8W Zeus, an American training aircraft
- BredaMenarinibus Zeus, an electric bus
- MV Zeus, a cargo ship launched in 1999 and renamed RMS Mulheim
- Zeus (roller coaster), a roller coaster at Mt. Olympus Theme Park
- ZEUS robotic surgical system, a medical robot
- ZEUS-HLONS (HMMWV Laser Ordnance Neutralization System), a laser weapon
- SAM-N-8 Zeus, a 1947 project for a guided anti-aircraft artillery shell
- Nickname of ZSU-23-4 Shilka, a Soviet anti-aircraft weapon system
- ZEUS, a laser: See List of petawatt lasers

== Biology ==
- Zeus (fish), an animal genus in the family Zeidae
- Zeus (fungus), a fungus genus in the family Rhytismataceae
- Zeus (gene), a Drosophila male fertility gene
- ZEUS robotic surgical system, a medical robot

== People ==
- Ata Messan Ajavon Zeus, Togolese politician
- Johann Kaspar Zeuss, German historian and founder of Celtic philology
- Zeus B. Held, German music producer
- Zeus A. Salazar, Filipino historian, anthropologist, and philosopher of history
- Zeus (gamer), South Korean professional League of Legends player
- Zeus (musician), a rapper from Botswana
- Zeus (American wrestler), American actor and former professional wrestler
- Zeus (Japanese wrestler), Japanese professional wrestler
- Zeuss, American record producer Christopher Harris
- Zamir White, American football player nicknamed "Zeus"

== Other uses ==
- Zeus (dog, born 2008), the world's tallest dog until 2014
- Zeus (dog, born 2019), the world's tallest dog until 2023
- 5731 Zeus, an Apollo asteroid

== See also ==
- Zeeuws or Zeelandic, the dialect of Zeeland in the Netherlands
- Zevs (artist), a French street artist
- ZEVS (transmitter), a Soviet/Russian submarine communication system
- Gameover ZeuS, a 2011 malware
- Zea (disambiguation)
- Zoo (disambiguation)
