= Harrisburg Subdivision =

Rail line in Pennsylvania, US

Coordinates: 39°57′43″N 75°11′04″W

The Harrisburg Subdivision and other nearby lines in West Philadelphia

The Harrisburg Subdivision is a railroad line owned by CSX Transportation in Pennsylvania. The line is located in Philadelphia, and connects Greenwich Yard and the Philadelphia Subdivision with the Trenton Subdivision along a former Pennsylvania Railroad line. Much of the Harrisburg Subdivision is the High Line' or West Philadelphia Elevated along 31st Street over the 30th Street Station area.

The line begins at Greenwich Yard in South Philadelphia, where it meets the Philadelphia Belt Line Railroad. It heads west alongside the Delaware Expressway (Interstate 95) and then north along and partially elevated over 25th Street, turning west at Washington Avenue to cross the Schuylkill River on the Arsenal Bridge. At Arsenal Interlocking, on the west side of the Schuylkill, a branch runs southwest alongside Amtrak's Northeast Corridor to a junction with the Philadelphia Subdivision near Lindbergh Boulevard.

The main line heads north from Arsenal, rises onto the elevated structure, and crosses to the west side of the Northeast Corridor. It heads north above 31st Street, finally touching down in the southeast approach to Zoo Interlocking. It leaves that interlocking to the north, staying on the west side of the Schuylkill River, and ending at the Trenton Subdivision at Belmont.

== History ==
=== 19th century ===
The oldest portion of the Harrisburg Subdivision, along the west side of the Schuylkill River from Grays Ferry southwest to the Philadelphia Subdivision, was opened in 1838 by the Philadelphia, Wilmington and Baltimore Railroad. A new PW&B line, now the Northeast Corridor, opened in 1872; the old line was leased to the Philadelphia and Reading Rail Road the next year.

From Arsenal east over the Arsenal Bridge and south along 25th Street to near Packer Avenue, the Pennsylvania Railroad built the Delaware Extension, completing it in 1862. The rest of the line, south and east to Greenwich Yard, opened in 1900 as the Schuylkill River Branch Extension to serve League Island.

The part of the Harrisburg Subdivision north of Zoo was built by the Junction Railroad and opened in 1863, connecting to what was then the main line of the Philadelphia and Reading Rail Road at Belmont. The Junction Railroad also built the piece from Arsenal southwest to Grays Ferry, opened in 1866. Through leases and mergers, the Junction Railroad became part of the Pennsylvania Railroad; the part from Zoo to Belmont was the Belmont Branch. The West Philadelphia Elevated, completed in 1904, was built by the PRR as a separate freight route through the 30th Street Station area between Arsenal and Zoo Interlockings.

=== 20th century ===
The entire line became part of Conrail in 1976; the Delaware Extension, West Philadelphia Elevated, and Belmont Branch were grouped with the former Reading Company line to Reading and Harrisburg as the Harrisburg Line.

In 1998, Conrail reconstructed the south end of the line, adding a direct connection from the Chester Secondary to CSX's Philadelphia Subdivision and allowing CSX-Conrail freights to use the High Line. The entire line from south of Arsenal to Belmont was assigned to CSX in the 1999 breakup of Conrail, while the rest of the Harrisburg Line became a Norfolk Southern Railway line.

== See also ==
- List of CSX Transportation lines
- Market Street Tunnel
