= Zoo station =

Zoo Station may refer to:

== Transportation ==
- Berlin Zoologischer Garten railway station, a rail station in Berlin, Germany
- Taipei Zoo Station, a metro station in Taipei, Taiwan
- Taipei Zoo South Station, a cable car station in Taipei, Taiwan
- Zoo station (Calgary), a light rail station in Calgary, Alberta, Canada
- Beijing Zoo Station, a metro station in Beijing, China
- Zoo station (Guangzhou Metro), a metro station in Guangzhou, China
- Zoo station (Chongqing Rail Transit), a metro station in Chongqing, China
- Zoological Garden station, a former rail station in Philadelphia, USA

== Other uses ==
- Zoo Station: The Story of Christiane F., a 1978 book by Kai Hermann and Horst Rieck
- "Zoo Station" (song), a 1991 song by U2
- Zoo Station: A U2:UV Experience, a temporary fan exhibit in promotion of U2:UV Achtung Baby Live at Sphere
- Zoo Station, a 2007 novel by David Downing named after the Berlin railway station

== See also ==
- Botanical Garden station (disambiguation)
- Kew Gardens station (disambiguation)
