= Zou =

Zou or ZOU may refer to:

== Places ==
- Zou (state), Chinese state that existed during the Zhou Dynasty
- Zou, Ivory Coast, town and sub-prefecture in Ivory Coast
- Zou Department of Benin
- Zou River of Benin
- Zoucheng, formerly Zou County, in Jining, Shandong, China

== Other uses ==
- Zou (surname) (鄒), a Chinese surname
- Zou (TV series), a French animated television series
- Zou people, indigenous community living along Indo-Burma frontier
- Zimbabwe Open University or "ZOU"
- ZOU!, the brand used by public transport services offered by the French region of Provence-Alpes-Côte d'Azur, including TER Provence-Alpes-Côte d'Azur and Chemins de fer de Provence
- Tsou people (鄒族), an indigenous people of central southern Taiwan

== See also ==
- Zo language, the language spoken by the Zo people
- Zo people, a group of indigenous tribe in Burma and northeast India
- Zoo (disambiguation)
- Zu (disambiguation)
