= Baltimore and Philadelphia Railroad =

Railway line in the United States of America

- Map of the Baltimore and Philadelphia Railroad, and the Philadelphia Branch of the B&O

Overview
- Headquarters: Wilmington and Philadelphia
- Reporting mark: B&P
- Locale: Pennsylvania, Delaware and Maryland
- Dates of operation: 1886–1989
- Successor: CSX

Technical
- Track gauge: 4 ft 8 1/2 in (1,435 mm) standard gauge
- Length: 109 miles (175 km)

The Baltimore and Philadelphia Railroad (reporting mark B&P) was a railroad line in the United States, built by the Baltimore and Ohio Railroad (B&O) from Philadelphia, Pennsylvania, to the Maryland-Delaware state line, where it connected with the B&O's Philadelphia Branch to reach Baltimore, Maryland. It was built in the 1880s after the B&O lost access to its previous route to Philadelphia, the Philadelphia, Wilmington and Baltimore Railroad (PW&B). The cost of building the new route, especially the Howard Street Tunnel on the connecting Baltimore Belt Line, led to the B&O's first bankruptcy. Today, the line is used by CSX Transportation for freight trains.

== History ==
=== 19th century ===
In 1838, the B&O began service from Baltimore to Philadelphia using the new PW&B line. Connecting trackage in Baltimore ran from the B&O's Mount Clare terminal east along Pratt Street and East Falls Avenue to the PW&B's President Street Station. From there the PW&B ran east on Fleet Street and Boston Street before leaving onto its own right-of-way.

In 1881, the B&O attempted to gain control of the PW&B, but lost the stock battle to the Pennsylvania Railroad, which informed the B&O that it would lose access to the PW&B line in 1884. This forced the B&O to build a new route to Philadelphia. It acquired the Delaware Western Railroad, which had a charter but no track, merged it into the Baltimore & Philadelphia in 1883, and began construction. The line was in full operation by 1886. While the line in Delaware and Pennsylvania was operated by the Baltimore and Philadelphia, the line in Maryland was operated directly by the B&O as its Philadelphia Branch.

Except at its two ends, the line was built within a few miles to the northwest of the PW&B. At the Baltimore end, the line ended in the Canton neighborhood, with a car ferry across the Patapsco River to Locust Point. At the Philadelphia end, the new line crossed the PW&B and its old alignment (part of the Philadelphia and Reading Railway's branch to Chester, Pennsylvania, and crossed to the east side of the Schuylkill River on the new B&O Railroad Bridge, just south of the Grays Ferry Bridge. A branch split there towards the Delaware River, while the main line continued north along the Schuylkill, with a station downtown, and then passed through the Art Museum Tunnel to Park Junction with the Philadelphia and Reading Railway's main line; this tunnel, the last part of the line to be finished, opened on December 15, 1886.

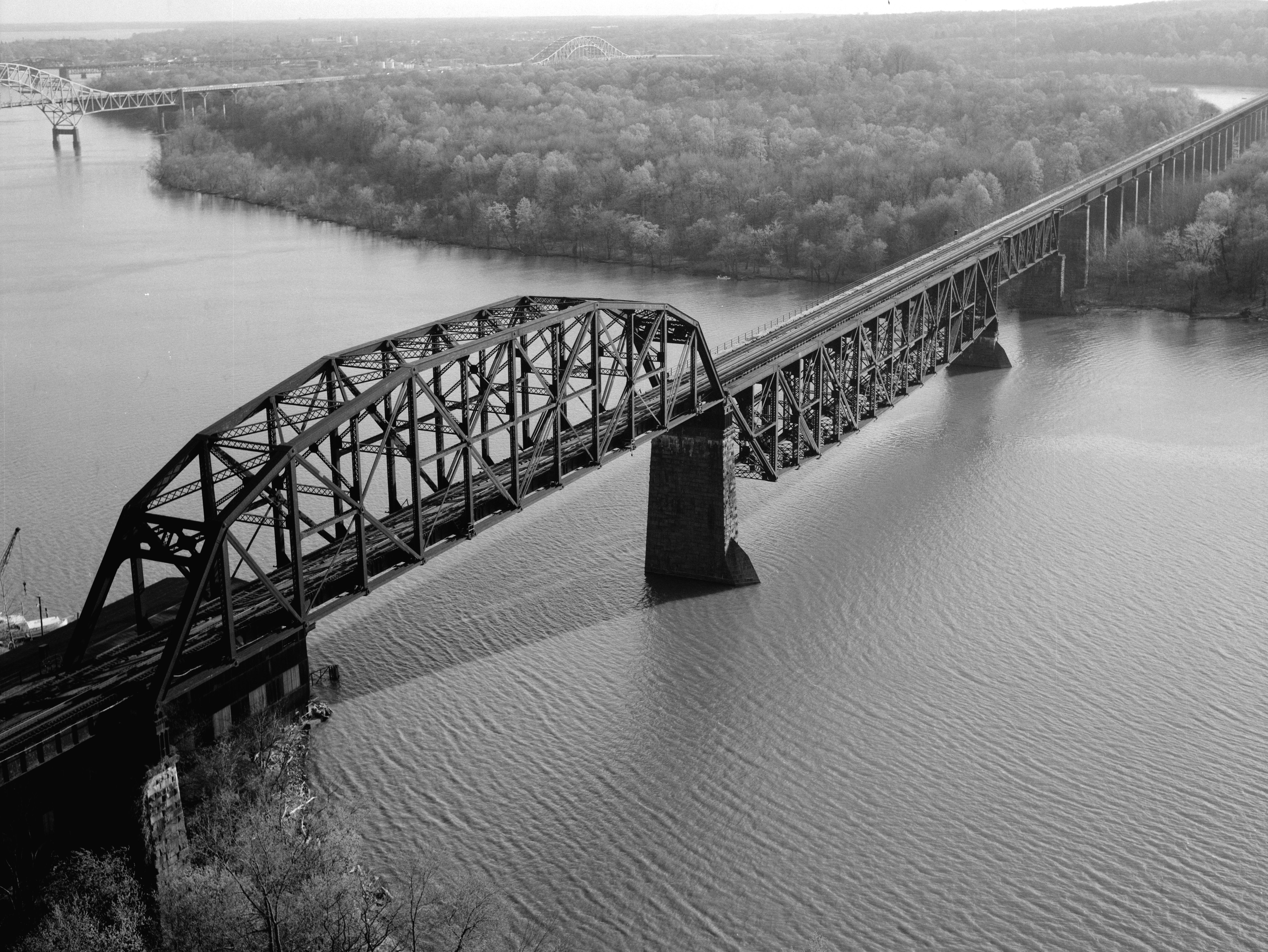
The CSX Susquehanna River Bridge is the second bridge at this crossing, a steel truss double track design built between 1907 and 1910 near Perryville, Maryland. It replaced a single-track iron and steel bridge built in 1886 during the original construction of the line.

The Reading, originally using the Junction Railroad west of the Schuylkill to access its Chester branch, obtained trackage rights over the Baltimore and Philadelphia, and the B&O obtained trackage rights over the Reading's lines from Philadelphia to Jersey City, New Jersey, across the Hudson River from New York City. (This route via the Reading originally ran via the main line, Port Richmond Branch, North Pennsylvania Railroad, North Pennsylvania Railroad Delaware River Branch, Delaware and Bound Brook Railroad and Central Railroad of New Jersey, later using the shortcut of the Philadelphia, Newtown and New York Railroad and New York Short Line Railroad rather than the North Pennsylvania.) The Baltimore and New York Railway and Staten Island Rapid Transit Railway provided their own freight terminal, at St. George on Staten Island.

Though a surface alignment through downtown Baltimore was authorized by the Maryland legislature, the B&O instead obtained a charter for the Baltimore Belt Line to provide a completely grade-separated route. This new route entered the long Howard Street Tunnel at Camden Station, running north under downtown, and then turning east through two shorter tunnels to a junction with the Philadelphia Branch at Bay View Yard. The Baltimore Belt Line was completed in 1895, and its expenses drove the B&O to bankruptcy in 1896.

=== 20th century ===
The last passenger trains ran through the tunnel and over the Baltimore and Philadelphia in 1958; since then all traffic has been freight. The route is now operated by CSX as its Philadelphia Subdivision.

== Branches ==
Delaware Branch
Snyder Avenue Branch
Point Breeze Branch
Stock Yard Branch
Oregon Avenue Extension

from East Side Junction to wharves and yards along the Delaware River on the east side of Philadelphia.

Crum Creek Branch

extending both north and south of a connection to the main line at Eddystone, Pennsylvania along Crum Creek. Served Leiper's quarry to the north and the Baldwin Locomotive Works to the south.

Market Street Branch

from the east end of Wilsmere yard (later, from Elsmere Junction) into Wilmington, Delaware to a station at Market Street. Provided passenger and freight service from downtown Wilmington.

South Side Extension or South Wilmington Branch

from a junction on the Market Street Branch across the Christina River to Third Street Dock. Served industries on the south side of the river.

Landenberg

from Landenberg Junction (at the west end of Wilsmere yard) to Landenberg, Pennsylvania. Later the Wilmington and Western Railroad.

Providence

built from Childs, Maryland to Providence, Maryland by the Lancaster, Cecil and Southern Railroad. Finished to a paper mill in Providence; a small amount of grading done to the north towards Oxford, Pennsylvania.

In Baltimore
