= Zu =

Zu or ZU may refer to:

== Arts, entertainment and mythology ==
=== Fictional elements ===
- Zu (mythology), an Akkadian god
- Zu, a mountain featured in the films Zu Warriors from the Magic Mountain and The Legend of Zu
- Zu, a large birdlike monster from the Final Fantasy series

=== Other uses in arts and entertainment ===
- Zu (band), an Italian hardcore/jazz band
- zu and zun, types of ancient Chinese ritual bronzes

== Cuisine ==
- Zu (beverage), an alcoholic rice drink from Mizoram
- Zozu, an alcoholic drink from Chin State

== Language ==
- There are two different kana (Japanese script) letters that are romanized as zu:
  - ず: Su (す) with dakuten (voicing marks)
  - づ: Tsu (つ) with dakuten; in modern standard Japanese primarily used for indicating a voiced consonant in the middle of a compound word, and can never begin a word
- Zu (cuneiform), a sign in cuneiform writing
- Zulu language, ISO 639-2 code:zu

== People and titles ==
- Zu (surname) (祖), a Chinese surname
- Zu, a nobiliary particle, in German
- Ziv Kalontarov (born 1997), Israeli swimmer

== Places ==
- Zu, North Khorasan, Iran
- Zu, Razavi Khorasan, Iran

== Science and mathematics ==
- Scott–Potter set theory, called ZU because it is equivalent to Zermelo set theory with urelements
- Zu (fish), a genus of ribbonfish

== Other uses ==
- Ziauddin University
- Zeppelin University
- Helios Airways (IATA code ZU)

== See also ==
- Zou (disambiguation)
