= Comparison of platforms for software agents =

There several platforms for software agents or also agent development toolkits, which can facilitate the development of multi-agent systems. Hereby, software agents are implemented as independent threads which communicate with each other using agent communication languages. Below is a chart intended to capture many of the features that are important to such platforms.

== Comparison of platforms ==
Agent-based modeling toolkit comparison
Platform	Description	License	Communication	Interoperability	Migration mechanism	GUI	Last Update
Cougaar	Multi-agent systems; highly distributed, scalable, reliable, survivable applications; Domain independent; large scale distributed, complex, data intensive (can be configured for small-scaled embedded applications)	Cougaar Open Source License (COSL) (Note: A modified version of the OSI approved BSD License)		Unknown	Unknown	Unknown	2012
JACK	A framework in Java for multi-agent system development	Proprietary	Unknown	FIPA JACK	Unknown	Unknown	May 18, 2006
JADE	Distributed applications composed of autonomous entities	GNU LGPL version 2;	Asynchronous	FIPA	RMI	Yes	August 15, 2021
SARL	Distributed applications composed of autonomous entities	Apache version 2	Event-based	Unknown	Unknown	Only in demo project	November 6, 2024 (Version 0.14.0)
IBM Agent Builder	Distributed applications composed of autonomous entities	Open source	Synchronous and asynchronous	MASIF	SOCKET	Partial	May 11, 2021
ZEUS	A toolkit for building distributed multiagent systems	Open source	Asynchronous	FIPA	No	Yes	Unknown
