= Schuylkill Arsenal Railroad Bridge =

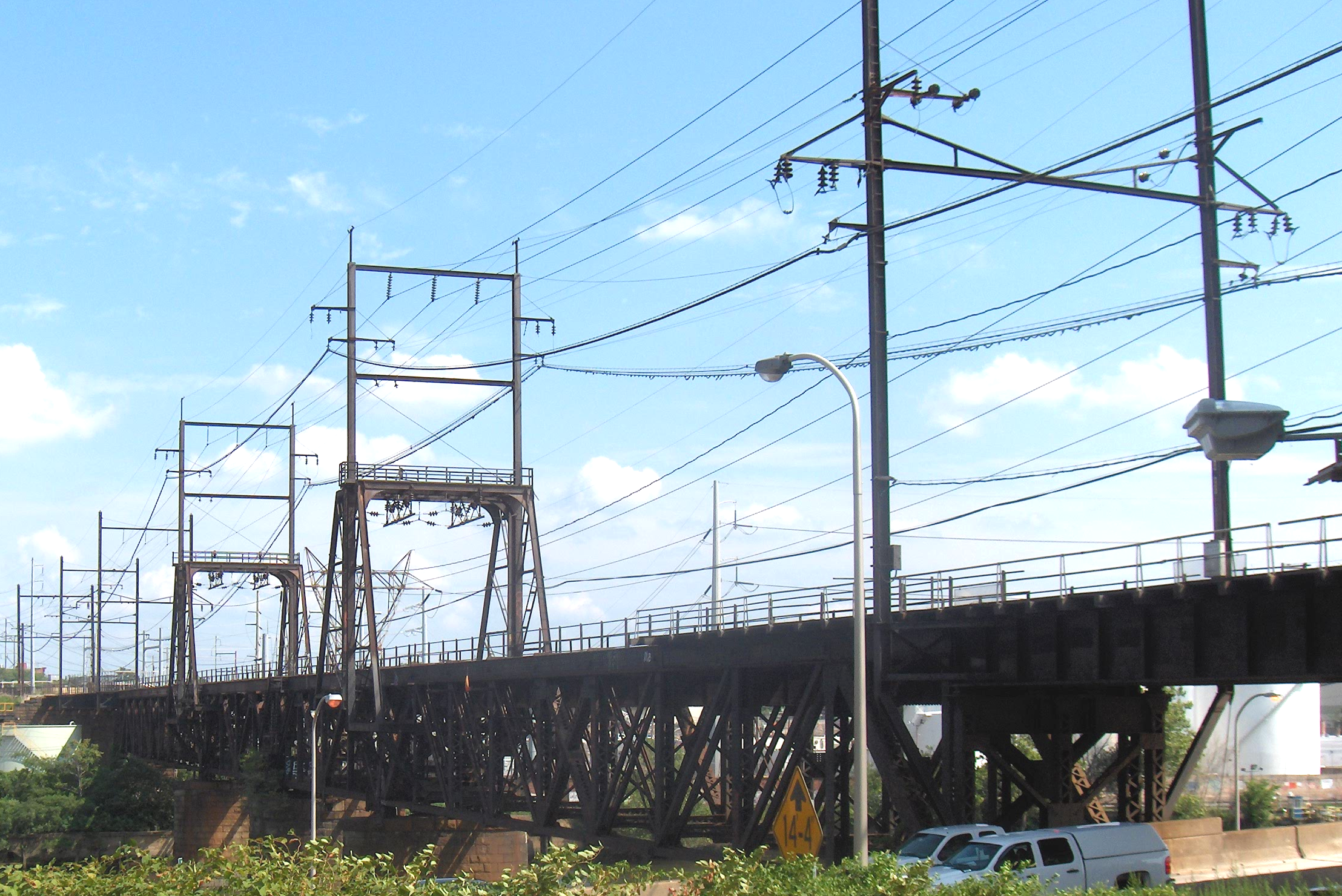
- Schuylkill Arsenal Railroad Bridge, looking east from upstream
- Coordinates: 39°56′36″N 75°11′30″W
- Carries: CSX Harrisburg Subdivision
- Crosses: CSX tracks, Schuylkill River, Schuylkill Expressway
- Locale: Grays Ferry neighborhood, eastern approach, University City neighborhood (western approach) in Philadelphia, Pennsylvania
- Other name(s): Arsenal Railroad Bridge, Arsenal Bridge
- Owner: CSX Transportation
- Preceded by: 1862 single track

Characteristics
- Design: deck truss spans
- Material: Wrought iron
- Total length: 832 feet
- Longest span: 192 feet
- No. of spans: 9
- Piers in water: 3

Statistics
- Daily traffic: open

Schuylkill Arsenal Railroad Bridge is a wrought iron, two-track, deck truss swing bridge across the Schuylkill River between the University City and Grays Ferry neighborhoods of Philadelphia, Pennsylvania. It was built in 1885–86 by the Pennsylvania Railroad. Today, its swing span has been fixed shut, and the electrical catenary de-energized.

The bridge is named for the Schuylkill Arsenal, which operated from 1799 to 1926 near the bridge's eastern approaches. Its western approach runs past the University of Pennsylvania's Meiklejohn Stadium.

In January 2014, a CSX train carrying crude oil derailed on the bridge.

== Original bridge ==
The 1886 bridge replaced the original Arsenal Bridge, which was built by the Pennsylvania Railroad in 1861 and put in operation on January 27, 1862, as part of the Delaware Extension. It carried a single track over three wrought-iron spans on stone piers and a central center-pivot swing span.

== See also ==
- List of crossings of the Schuylkill River
