= Junction Railroad (Philadelphia) =

Overview
- Headquarters: Philadelphia, Pennsylvania
- Locale: Philadelphia, Pennsylvania
- Dates of operation: 1860–1908
- Successor: Pennsylvania Railroad

Technical
- Track gauge: 4 ft 8 1/2 in (1,435 mm) standard gauge

The Junction Railroad was a railroad created in 1860 to connect lines west of downtown Philadelphia, Pennsylvania, and allow north–south traffic through the metropolitan area for the first time. The railroad consisted of 3.56 miles of double track and 5.3 miles of sidings. It owned no locomotives or rolling stock. The line connected the Philadelphia and Reading Rail Road line at the west end of the Columbia Bridge over the Schuylkill River, crossed the Pennsylvania Railroad line, ran parallel to Market Street, and turned south to connect with the Philadelphia, Wilmington and Baltimore Railroad at Gray's Ferry.

It came under Pennsylvania Railroad control in 1881, and was eliminated by merger in 1908.

== History ==
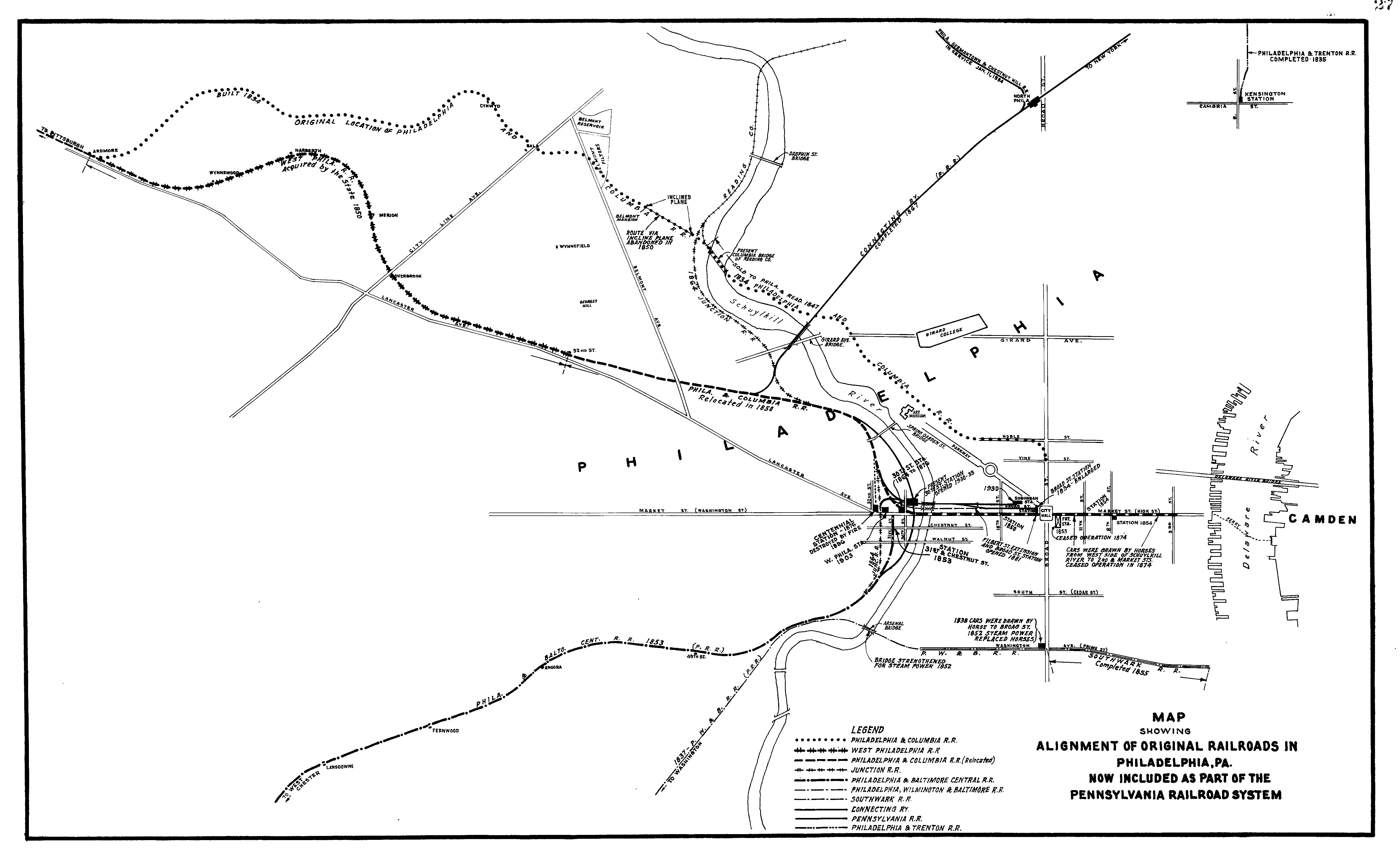
The Junction Railroad is among the lines depicted

In 1860, there were four lines into downtown Philadelphia from the west:

- The Reading came southeasterly along the west bank of the Schuylkill to Belmont, where it crossed the river and entered downtown from the northwest.
- The Pennsylvania came from the west-northwest and hit the west bank of the Schuylkill near 32nd Street, turning southeast and crossing the river along Market Street into downtown.
- The West Chester and Philadelphia Railroad met the west bank near the PW&B's Newkirk Viaduct at Grays Ferry, turned northeast onto 31st Street and ended at Market Street.
- The PW&B came from the southwest along the current Airport Line and crossed the Viaduct and entered downtown from the south. The former roadbed is currently known as Washington Avenue.

The Junction Railroad was incorporated on May 3, 1860, to connect the Reading, Pennsylvania, and PW&B lines through West Philadelphia, which sits across the Schuylkill from downtown. The three lines each bought a one-third share in the Junction Railroad on August 1, 1861, and the company was organized on October 3. Construction began from Belmont to West Philadelphia in 1862, including trackage rights along the PRR between 35th Street (now Zoo interlocking) and Market Street; this opened on November 23, 1863. From West Philadelphia south to Grays Ferry, the Junction Railroad mostly paralleled the WC&P, and had to cross it somewhere, leading to a dispute between the two companies and a delay in opening the southern half. One track opened south of the WC&P crossing at Spruce Street in December 1864, giving a temporary routing via the WC&P through West Philadelphia. The final portion, from Market Street to Spruce Street, including the Market Street Tunnel, opened on July 1, 1866.

The Connecting Railway, operated by the Philadelphia and Trenton Railroad, opened in 1867. It served as another connecting link, running from the Junction Railroad and PRR main line at Zoo interlocking east to the lines heading north from downtown.

In 1871, the south end was reconfigured due to the Darby Improvement, which moved the PW&B to the current Northeast Corridor alignment; the old alignment was leased to the Reading in 1873. The Reading began operating passenger trains over the entire Junction Railroad on September 3, 1873, with a transfer to the PW&B at Grays Ferry. On April 1, 1876, the Reading leased the northern piece of the line for a year to access a temporary station for U.S. centennial celebrations.

The PRR ownership of the middle portion led to problems starting in 1880, when the Baltimore and Ohio Railroad shifted its New York traffic coming off the PW&B to the Delaware and Bound Brook Railroad, using the entire Junction Railroad to Belmont. The PRR gained control of the PW&B in 1881, forcing the B&O to build the Baltimore and Philadelphia Railroad to retain Philadelphia access; this line completely avoided the Junction Railroad by running along the east bank of the Schuylkill. Through Reading trains were also moved off the Junction Railroad, using the B&O's route instead.

The PB&W leased the Junction Railroad on March 1, 1899. The PRR's West Philadelphia Elevated line, completed in 1904, provided an alternate route for freight trains that would use the central piece of the Junction Railroad through the Market Street Tunnel or the PRR's River Line along the Schuylkill.

=== Merged with PRR ===
The Junction Railroad was merged into the PRR on March 31, 1908, becoming the Belmont Branch north of and the Grays Ferry Branch (also 32nd Street Branch) south of West Philadelphia. Except for the Market Street Tunnel, the Grays Ferry Branch was part of the main line from Broad Street Station towards Baltimore. The Belmont Branch remained a connection to the Reading.

=== Post-PRR ===
After the PRR and Reading both became part of Conrail in 1976, it became part of the Harrisburg Line, along with the West Philadelphia Elevated Branch and Delaware Extension to Greenwich Yard. In the 1999 breakup of Conrail, the Harrisburg Line south of Belmont became CSX Transportation's Harrisburg Subdivision.

The old Junction Railroad through the Market Street Tunnel has been abandoned, and the rest of the line is now a SEPTA Regional Rail main line to Arsenal Interlocking and Amtrak's Northeast Corridor to Grays Ferry.

== See also ==
- Connecting Railway
- History of rail transport in Philadelphia
