= West Philadelphia Elevated =

Railroad viaduct in Pennsylvania, United States

Coordinates: 39.962038°N 75.184409°W

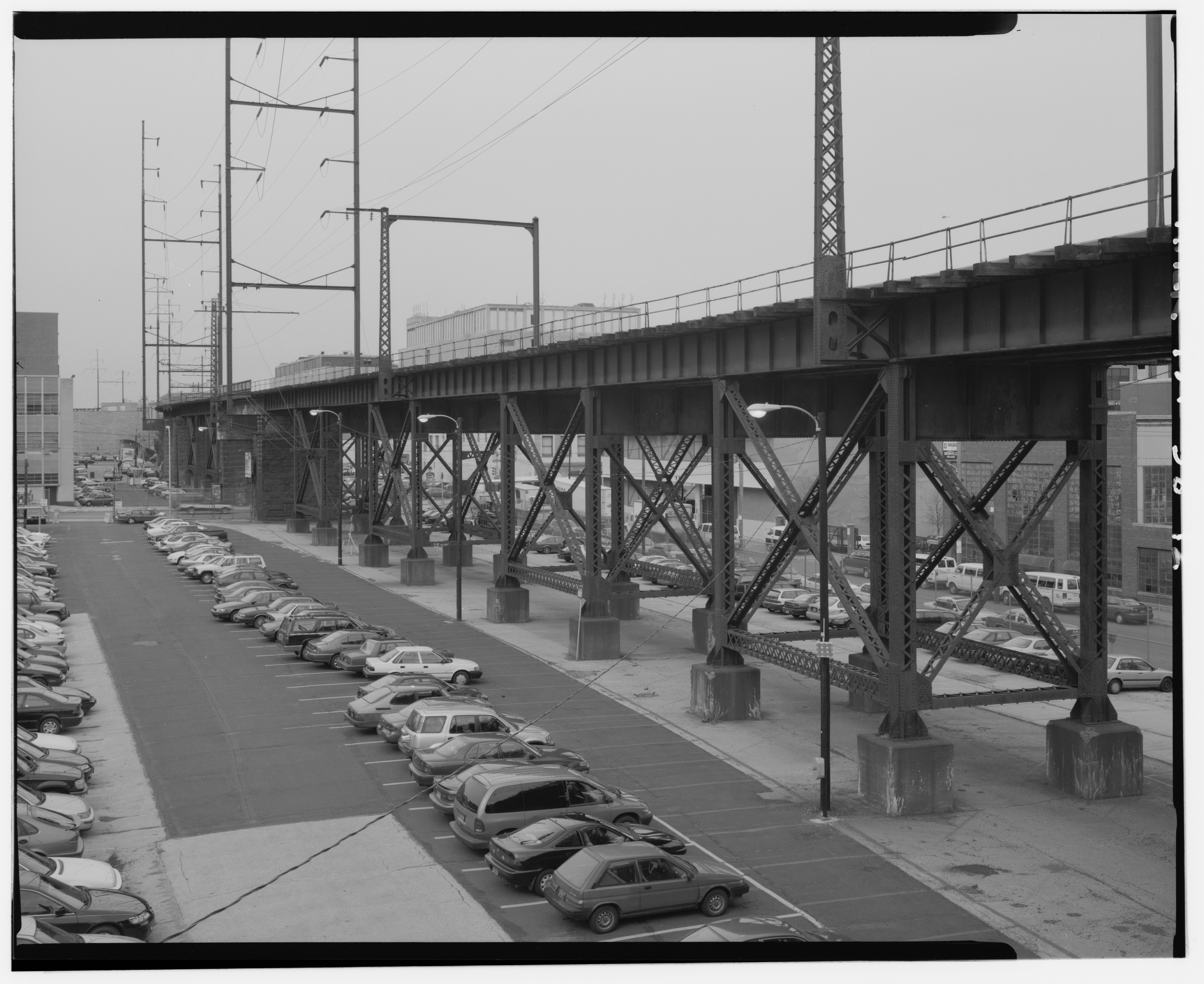
The West Philadelphia Elevated near Walnut Street.

The West Philadelphia Elevated, also known as the High Line or Philadelphia High Line, is a railroad viaduct in the western part of Philadelphia, Pennsylvania. Now part of the Harrisburg Subdivision of CSX Transportation, the viaduct was built in 1903 by the Pennsylvania Railroad (PRR) to allow through freight trains to bypass rail yards, industrial sidings, and a passenger station.

The 8,140-foot (2,480 m) structure runs north–south, over and alongside tracks that serve today's 30th Street Station. Most of the structure is steel, but a 1,045-foot (319 m) section north of the station is made of brick arches; it is the country's longest brick bridge and probably its longest brick building.

== History ==
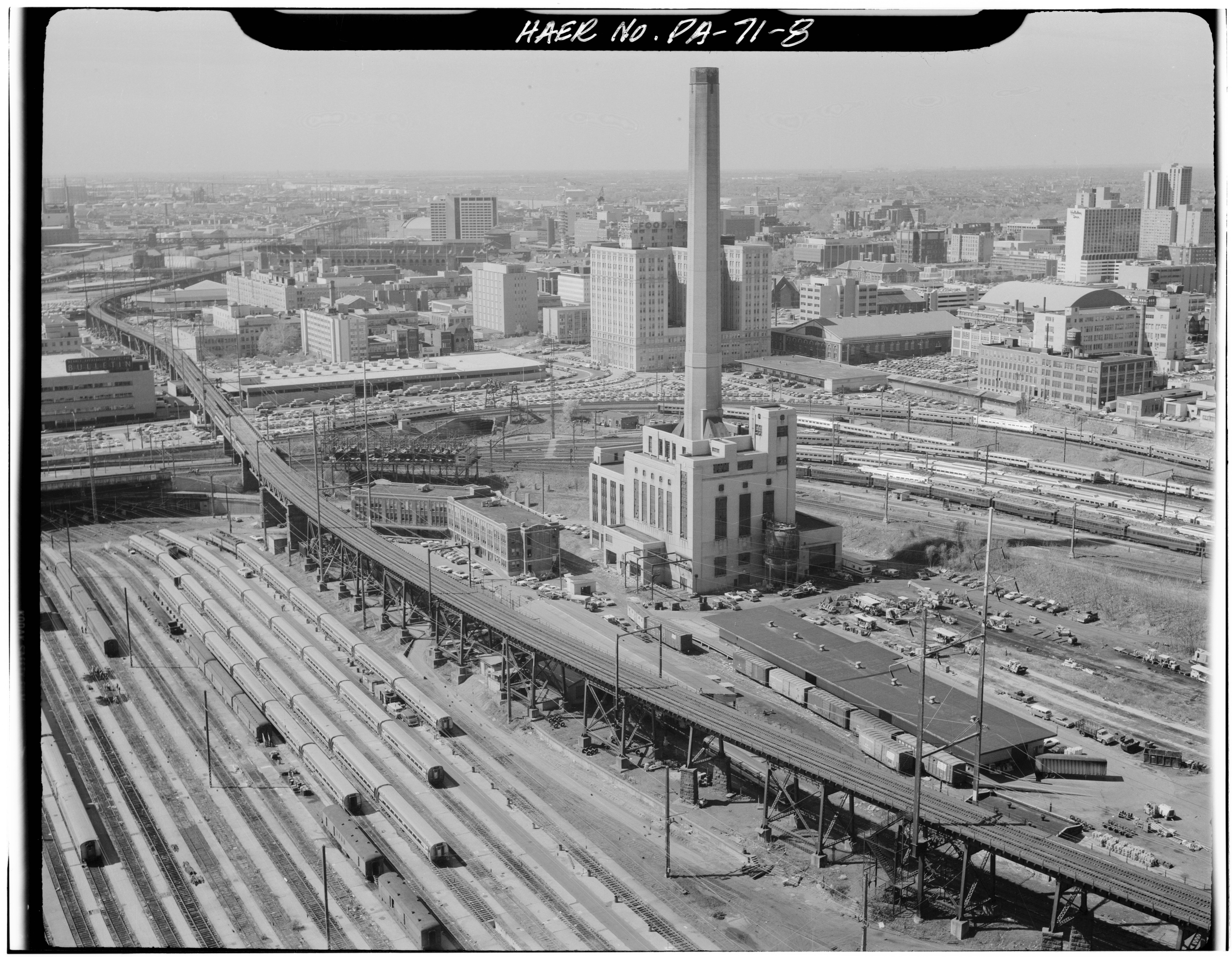
The High Line bypasses the area around 30th Street Station.

At the turn of the century, the Pennsylvania Railroad upgraded several routes to improve the handling of freight traffic, so that passenger and freight trains could be run on separate lines as much as possible.

In the metropolitan area of Philadelphia, the route of the Northeast Corridor around Broad Street Station proved to be a bottleneck. The terminus station sat on the east side of the Schuylkill River and was connected via a wye on the west side of the river to the main line running there. In the area of these tracks there were also a railroad yard, various industrial plants, and after 1903, the West Philadelphia Station for through north–south trains. (West Philadelphia Station was replaced by 30th Street Station in 1933.)

Connections to other railroad lines were nearby. On the north side, these included the Philadelphia-to-Harrisburg Main Line to Harrisburg, the entrance to the 37th Street Yard, and the Junction Railroad, a connection to the PRR competitor Reading. On the south side, these included the line to West Chester and the connection to the Port of Philadelphia in the south of the city.

With the West Philadelphia Elevated, two through tracks for freight traffic in north–south direction could be carried over these railway facilities. This would allow freight trains coming from New York City or Harrisburg to travel south to Baltimore and Washington, DC without stopping. Likewise, the Junction Railroad and the entrance to the port were connected to the viaduct.

The construction was approved on December 24, 1902, by the city administration. The construction work was completed by the end of 1904.

== Description ==
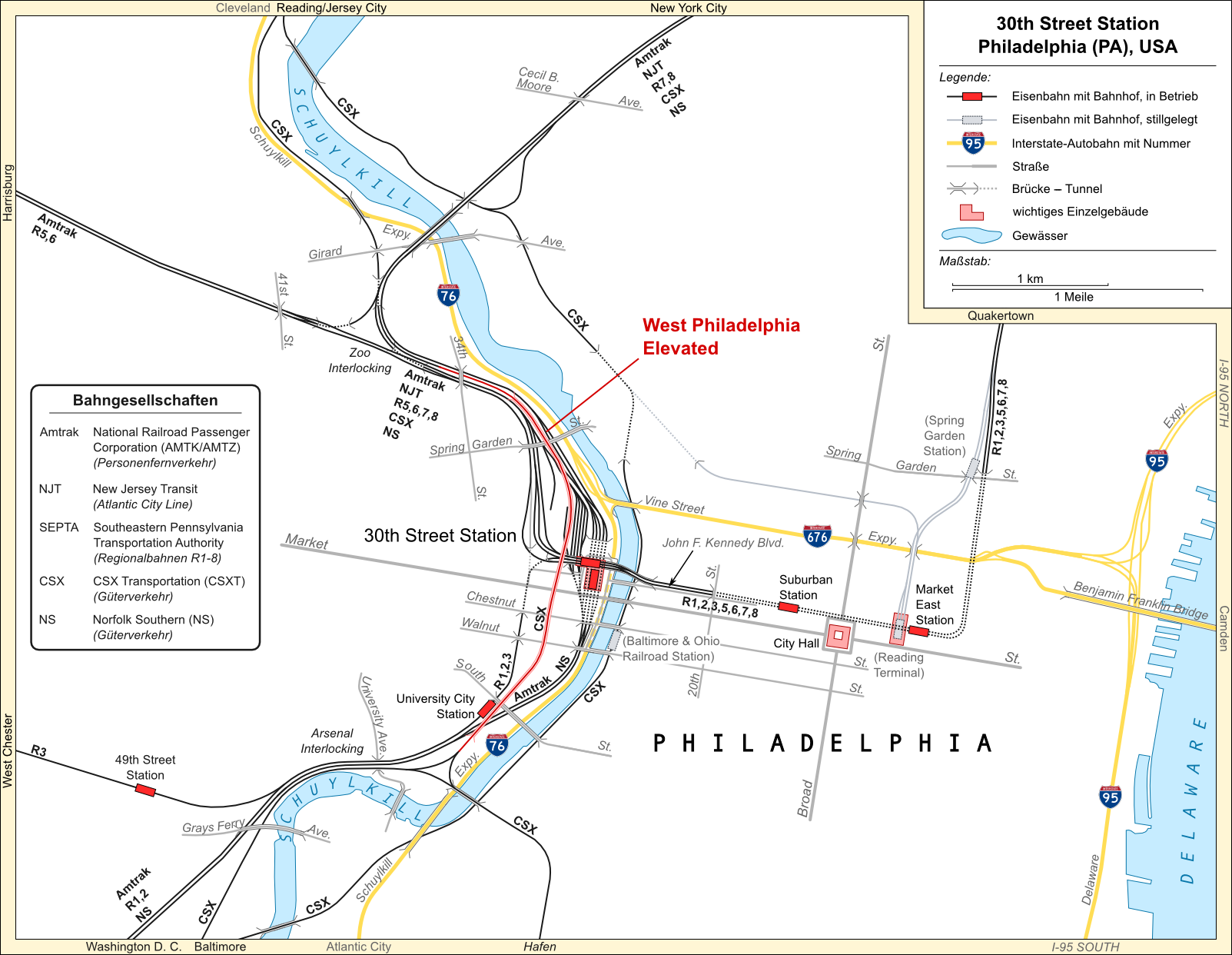
The viaduct on the map near 30th Street Station.

The viaduct extends over a total length of 8,140 feet (2,480 m) in the north–south direction and can be reached at both ends via railroad embankments. It makes a gentle left turn, which is required by the layout of the tracks around 30th Street Station around and ultimately by the Schuylkill itself.

The southern approach lies between the tracks of the Northeast Corridor and the Schuylkill. Arsenal Interlocking, which marks the merger of the two lines, is located there. From the east, the Harrisburg Subdivision comes from the port and has just crossed the Schuylkill on the Arsenal Bridge, and from the southwest is the connecting track from the northeast corridor, which also serves as access from the parallel CSX Philadelphia Subdivision. The viaduct starts just after the merge of the two lines, about 0.8 miles (1.3 km) directly southwest of 30th Street Station.

The High Line initially runs in a northeasterly direction. It crosses the main tracks of the Northeast Corridor at an acute angle, then passes immediately to the east of the Penn Medicine SEPTA station and over the South Street bridge. After about 500 yards (460 m), the viaduct turns north and crosses Walnut Street, Chestnut Street, Ludlow Street, Market Street, and John F. Kennedy Boulevard in succession. The route runs along 31st Street in this area, following the alignment of the street grid. Then, it goes about 185 yards (169 m) west past the train sheds of 30th Street Station. The upper platform level of the tower station is crossed at its extreme western end.

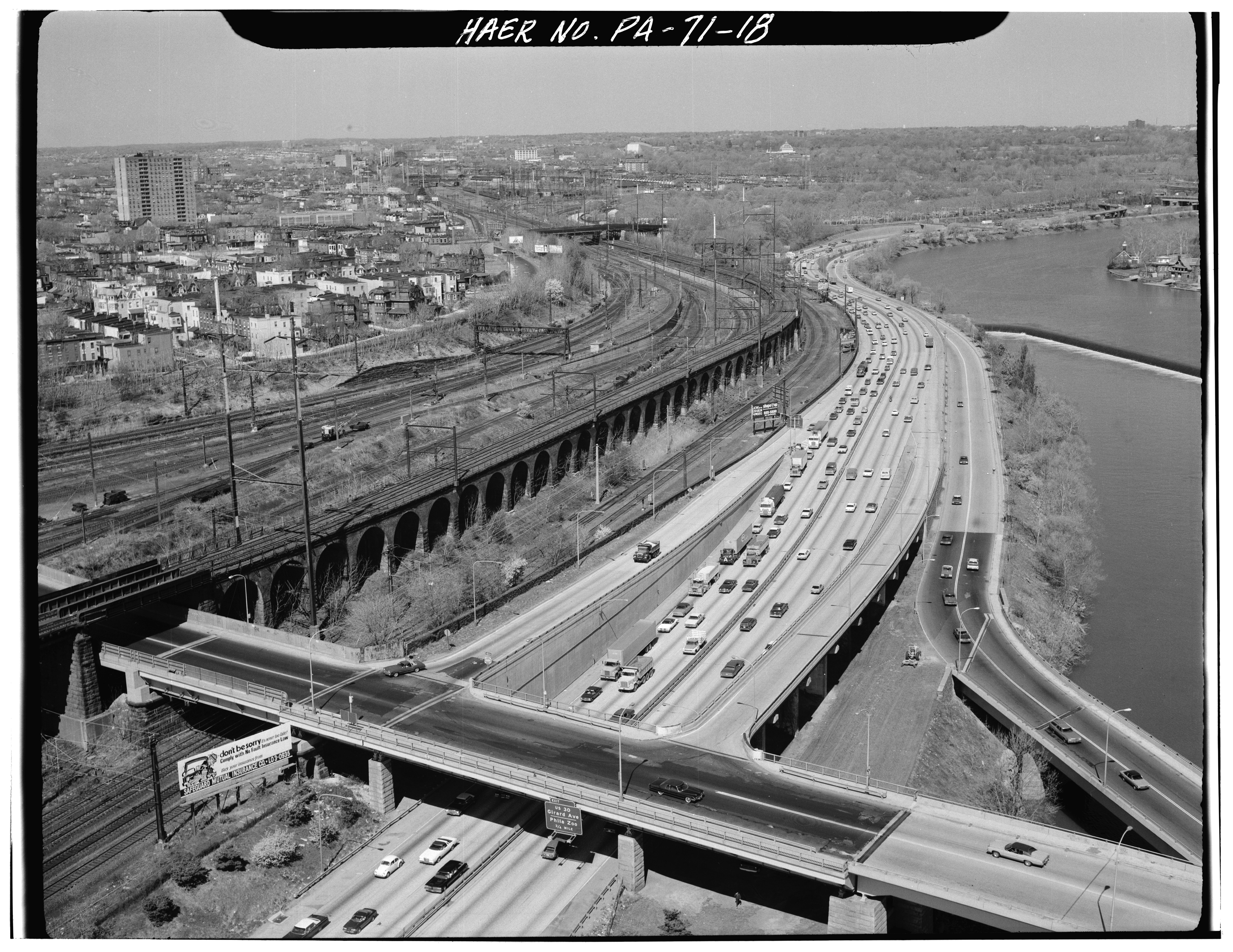
The ramp with brick arches on the north end.

Next it begins a long left turn, which runs above the northern tracks of 30th Street Station. About 350 yards (320 m) after crossing the Spring Garden Street bridge, the viaduct connects to a 500-yard (460 m) long ramp that ends at 34th Street. This area is just southeast of Zoo Interlocking, the wye between the Northeast Corridor and the Philadelphia to Harrisburg Main Line.

The ramp at the north end leads down to the middle of the track. However, at this point there are no more rail connections since about 1995. The route heads northwest for about 820 yards (750 m) through a tunnel and leads to CSX's Trenton Subdivision, which in turn leads to Jersey City.

== Changes in use ==
The West Philadelphia Elevated was built by the Pennsylvania Railroad to accommodate freight traffic along the Northeast Corridor. Freight trains were routed along the secondary tracks next to the main line itself, the most important of which was the connection to the port at the southern end. This did not change after the merger of the PRR and the New York Central Railroad into Penn Central in 1968, and Conrail's acquisition of the line in 1976 after Penn Central's bankruptcy.

With the expansion of the Northeast Corridor for the Acela Express in the early 1990s, the freight traffic was then almost completely shifted to the parallel lines of the former PRR competitors Baltimore and Ohio Railroad (B&O) and Reading, which at that time both belonged to CSX. From those lines, however, there has never been direct access to the Port of Philadelphia, so trains for the port continued to use the Junction Railroad and the High Line.

The connections to the Northeast Corridor were dismantled. At the south end, a new connecting curve to CSX's Philadelphia subdivision was built, so that the viaduct together with the Junction Railroad forms a parallel route to the former B&O in the city of Philadelphia, and provides rail access to the port.

== Construction and appearance ==
The viaduct consists of two sections. The much larger part is a steel construction with 136 sections and the same number of columns. The section north of Spring Garden Street consists of an arched bridge with 30 brick arches that extends halfway up to 34th Street. The viaduct has a double track design and was probably electrified around 1930. The western track has been impassable since at least the late 1990s.

=== Steel construction ===
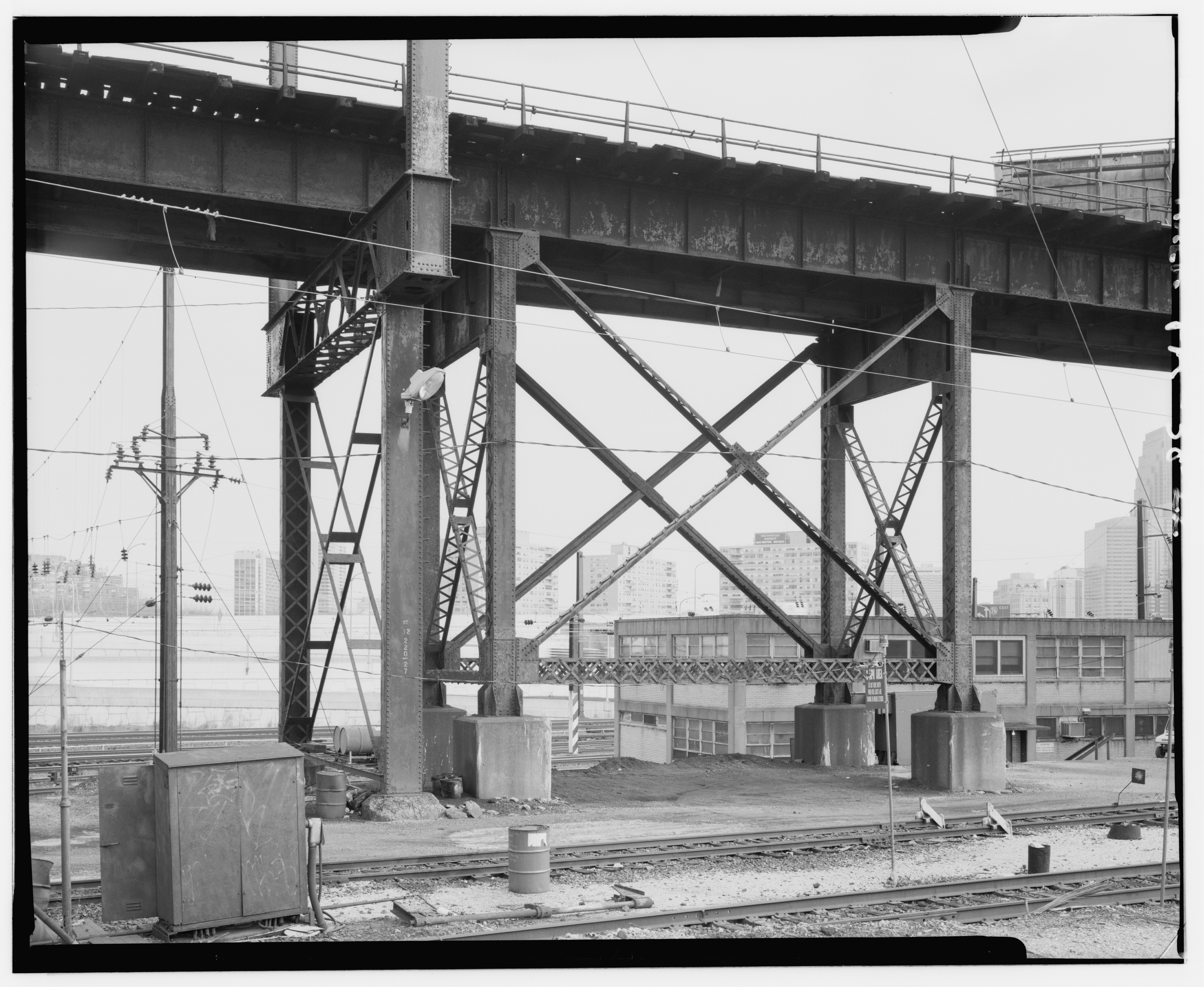
One of the steel sections.

The basic construction of the two steel sections is a series of supporting frames ("portals") along the route, upon which a longitudinal beam pair rests for each of the two tracks. The frames are about 33 feet (10 m) high and are alternately spaced at about 36 feet (11 m) and 45 feet (14 m) apart, with the pairs closer together connected by diagonal rods for stiffening in the longitudinal direction and by beams in the transverse direction.

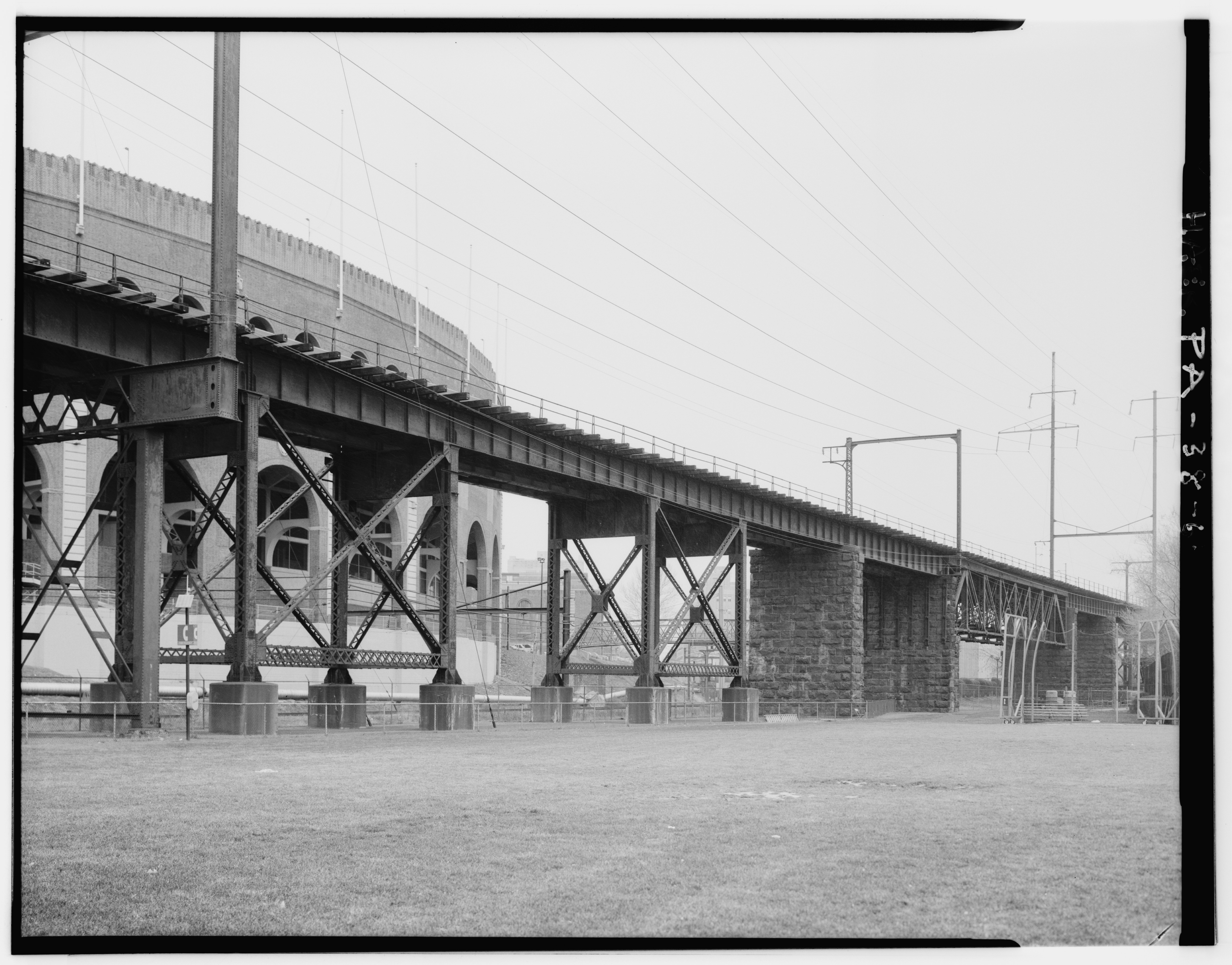
Various longer spans along the route.

However, local conditions required deviations from this scheme in some places. Where, for example, steel supports were not possible due to intersecting roads, a series of natural stone pillars were built. The associated spans often have excess length and are then either designed as a deck truss or (for larger passage heights) as a half-through plate girder bridge. The longest such section has a span of 156 feet (48 m).

Several of these long spans are related to the 1903 track layouts, but the track layout has changed completely since the Philadelphia improvements in the 1930s. Therefore, these spans do not always correspond with the modern conditions, so that their arrangement from today's point of view sometimes seems quite arbitrary.

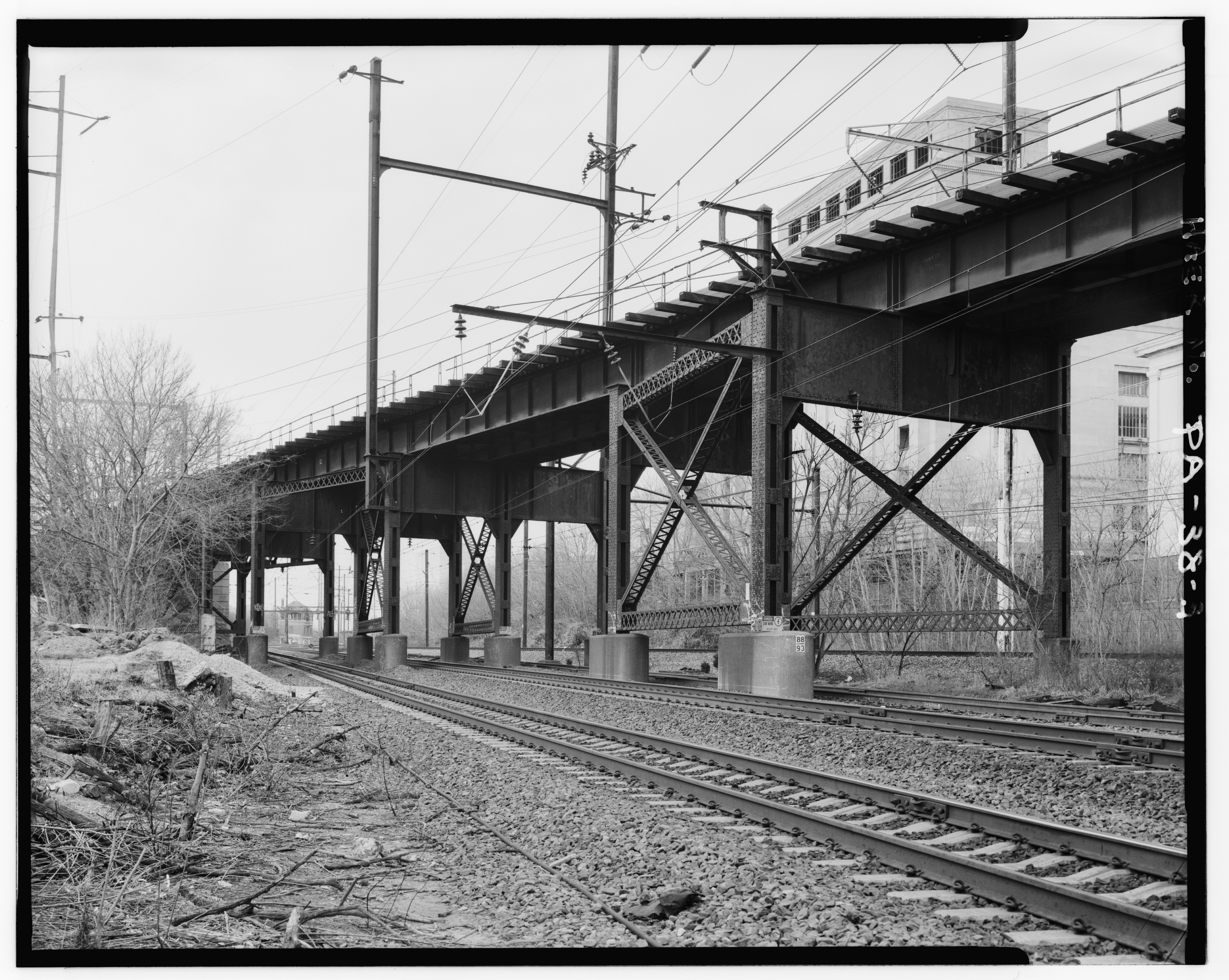
The crossing of the Northeast Corridor at the southern end.

Other exceptions are the two crossings of the tracks below at the ends of the viaduct. Since the change in alignment of the tracks below, the viaduct crosses them at a very acute angle, so that its steel supports are at an angle to the viaduct and parallel to the intersecting tracks.

=== Brick arches ===
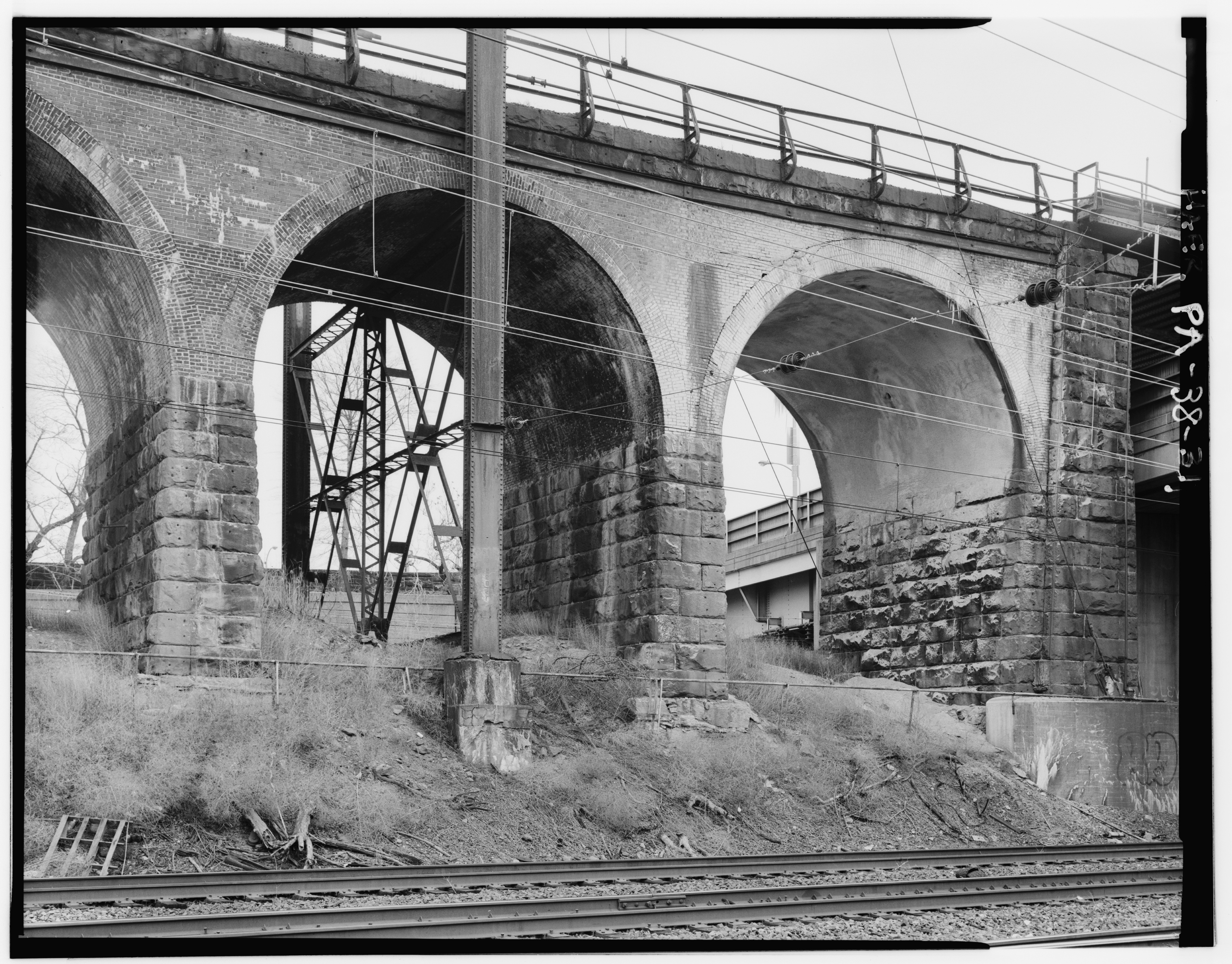
Two of the brick arches.

The arched bridge at the northern end is 350 yards (320 m) long and comprises 30 arches, each with 30 feet (9.1 m) of open space. Brick was used for the masonry, contrary to the then-usual practice of the PRR to build bridges as far as possible in natural stone. This probably made this structure the longest brick bridge in the United States.

Concrete, natural stone and bricks were available for the construction of this section at the time. Because concrete was considered unaesthetic and probably would have been too expensive, the decision fell in favor of masonry. Because natural stone could not have been procured fast enough in the quantities needed, the choice ultimately fell to brick, although it was very labor-intensive.

=== Catenary ===
For the catenary, the typical PRR portal masts were used, which carry traction power lines at the highly extended upper ends of their supports. The masts are either mounted laterally to the steel columns of the viaduct or anchored in the ground next to it. Since the removal of the catenary in the 1980s, only the traction power lines still run along the High Line.
