= Zoo Junction =

Railroad junction in Philadelphia

Coordinates: 39.9684°N 75.1951°W

Map of Zoo Junction and the multiple lines and services passing through the junction

Zoo Junction is a junction on Amtrak's Northeast Corridor in Philadelphia, Pennsylvania, where the Northeast Corridor meets the Keystone Corridor, previously known as the Pennsylvania Railroad's Main Line.

== History ==
=== 19th century ===
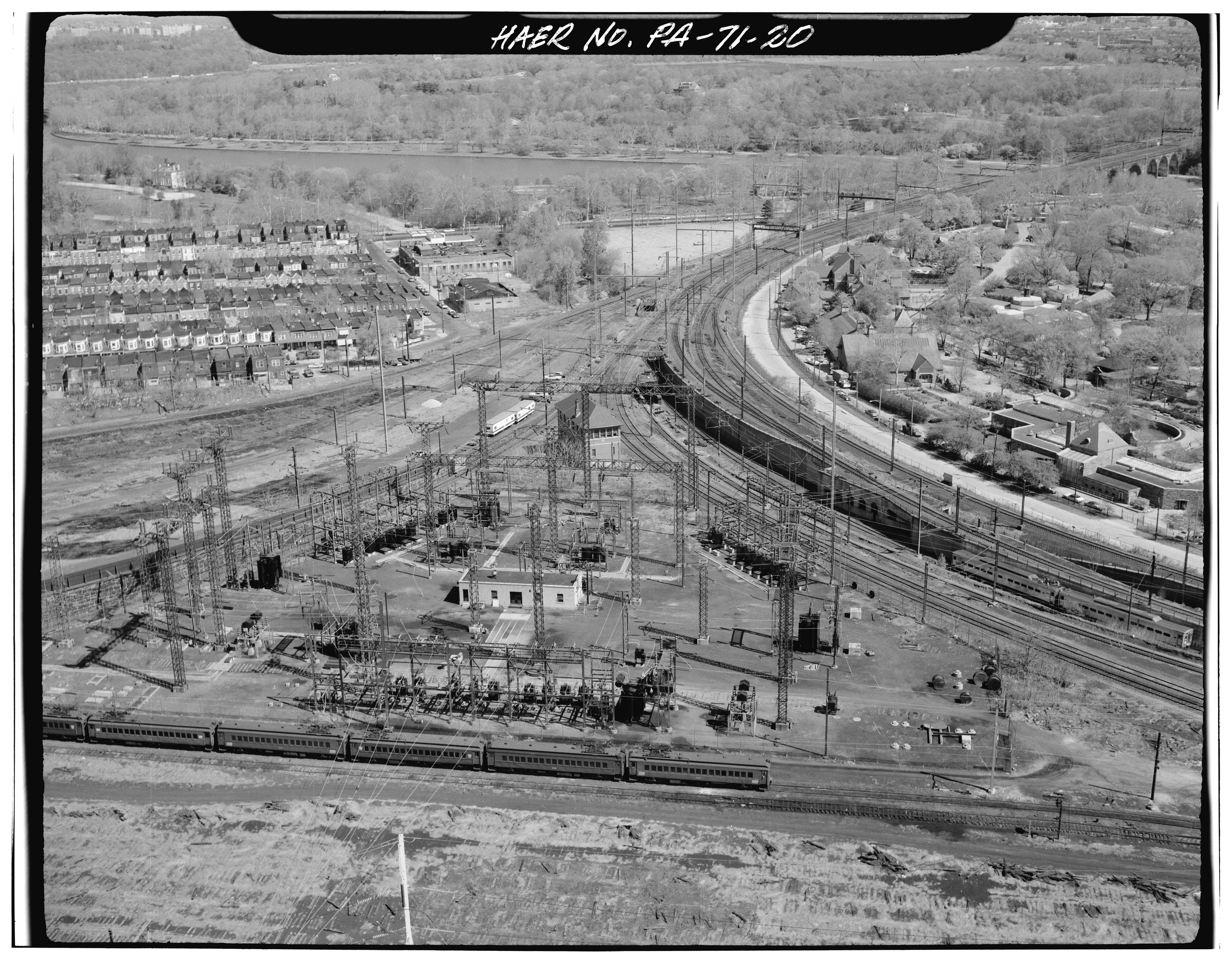
A 1977 photo of Zoo Junction with the Northeast Corridor visible on the right, the Schuylkill River in the background, and the Philadelphia Zoo on the right.

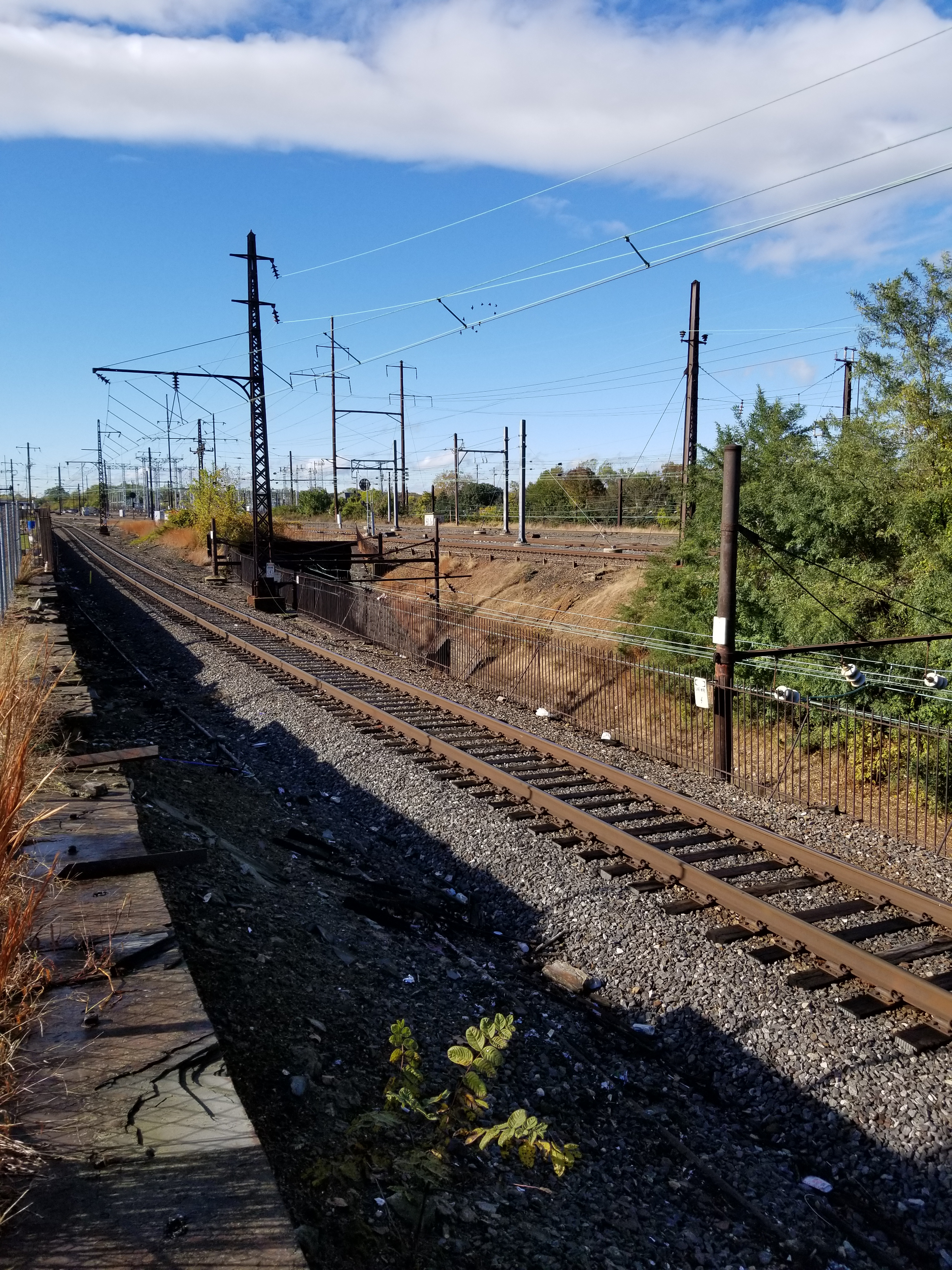
The south portal of the 36th Street Tunnel used by SEPTA Regional Rail, where two connecting tracks from 30th Street Station's upper level run under the Keystone Corridor tracks, connecting to the Northeast Corridor tracks

Zoo Junction is a flying junction where multiple tracks cross one another by bridges to avoid conflict with other trains.

In 1870, the Pennsylvania Railroad built the Connecting Railway from Frankford Junction to Zoo to bypass congested street running in Philadelphia. Instead of reaching the city directly from the north, the Connecting Railway turned west, crossed the Schuylkill River on the Connecting Railway Bridge (a stone arch viaduct) and then turned south to join the PRR's Main Line at Mantua Junction. Mantua was a wye junction controlled by three manual signal boxes; there was also an engine house and the massive 37th Street Yard in the center of the wye. By 1888, the Mantua Junction was at capacity.

=== 20th and 21st centuries ===
In 1910, the PRR built two duck-under tunnels to allow trains to reach the Connecting Railway without blocking the Main Line and 37th Street Yard. The eastern 36th Street Tunnel also allowed grade-separated access to the Junction Railroad connecting to the Philadelphia and Reading Railway. Today, the tunnel only connects to the Northeast Corridor and is used by SEPTA, while the Junction Railroad now connects to the West Philadelphia Elevated as part of the CSX Harrisburg Subdivision. The western tunnel, called the New York-Pittsburgh Subway, allowed trains running from New York City to Pittsburgh and west to bypass Broad Street station. Such express trains only stopped in North Philadelphia. In 1935, the interlocking reached its final form in conjunction with electrification and the construction of 30th Street Station and Suburban Station. Suburban commuter trains were routed to 30th Street's upper level towards Suburban, while intercity trains ran to the lower level.

In the crescent-shaped pocket between the junction and the river is the Philadelphia Zoo, which gave the interlocking its name. The former Zoological Garden station was located next to the interlocking to serve visitors to the Zoo.
