= Southwark Railroad =

The Southwark Rail-Road was a small part of the Pennsylvania Railroad system in Philadelphia, Pennsylvania.

== History ==
The Southwark Rail-Road was chartered on April 2, 1831. The company constructed tracks in 1835, along Broad Street from South Street to Washington Avenue, and along Washington Avenue {Prime} from Broad Street to the Delaware River. At the intersection of Broad Street and Washington Avenue, the Philadelphia, Wilmington and Baltimore Railroad ended at the Southwark Rail-Road. The PW&B's passenger station was just west of Broad Street; the Southwark Rail-Road was intended for freight, and was leased to and operated by the PW&B. At the South Street end, the Philadelphia and Reading Railroad continued north on Broad Street.

The tracks on Broad Street were removed in 1870. Around the same time, tracks were built along the riverfront from the yard at the river north to Almond Street (now Kenilworth Street), connecting it to the Pennsylvania Railroad's Delaware Extension.

On March 28, 1877, the Southwark Rail-Road was merged into the Philadelphia, Wilmington and Baltimore Railroad, along with several other railroads. In 1881, the Pennsylvania Railroad bought up the majority of the PW&B's stock. The company was later merged into the Philadelphia, Baltimore and Washington Railroad, another PRR subsidiary.

| Preceded by | Southwark Rail-Road Company chartered April 2, 1831 merged May 21, 1877 | Succeeded by Philadelphia, Wilmington and Baltimore Railroad |
