= Zoological Garden station =

Rail station in Philadelphia, Pennsylvania

Coordinates: 39.974°N 75.195°W

Zoological Garden
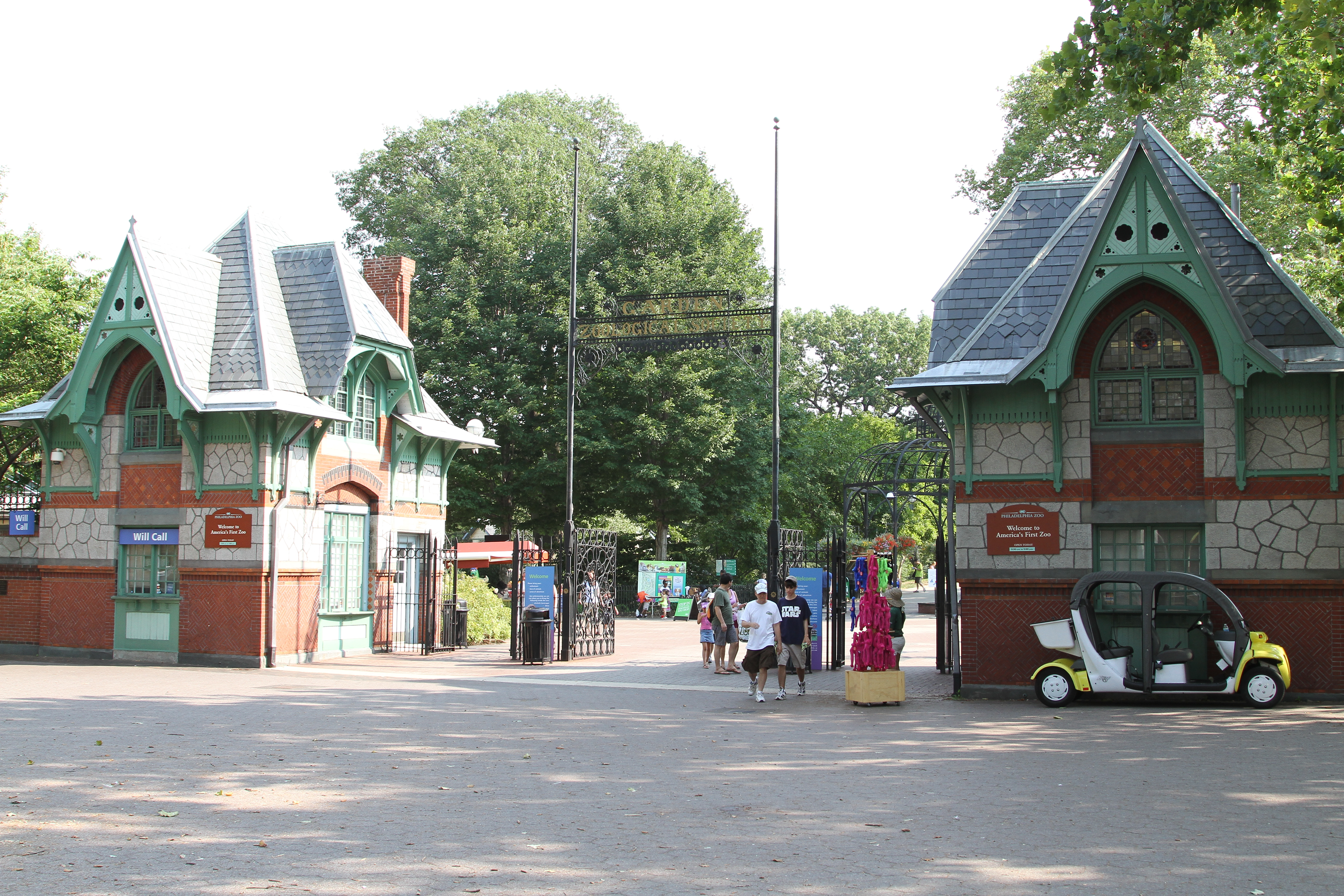
- Entrance to the Philadelphia Zoo, just below where the station once stood

General information
- Location: Girard/34th Street; Philadelphia
- System: Former Pennsylvania Railroad station
- Owner: SEPTA
- Tracks: 4

Construction
- Structure type: none, all removed
- Platform levels: 1

History
- Opened: 1874
- Closed: November 24, 1901

Former services
Preceding station	Pennsylvania Railroad	Following station
Ridge Avenue toward Chestnut Hill	Chestnut Hill Line	Powelton Avenue toward Philadelphia–Broad Street
Engleside toward Trenton	Trenton Line	Powelton Avenue toward Philadelphia–Broad Street
Location

Zoological Garden station was a railroad station in Philadelphia, Pennsylvania. It was located at 34th Street and Girard Avenue, it served the Philadelphia Zoo and nearby areas. Built by the Pennsylvania Railroad, it closed in November 1901 as the railroad expanded. The zoo proposed in 2013 that a new station be created at 34th Street and Mantua, though the complicated network of tracks, known as Zoo interlocking, presents engineering challenges. The zoo, recognizing that SEPTA lacks the necessary resources, is seeking funding from the federal government.

== See also ==
- Zoo Junction
- Philadelphia Zoo
