= Zeus (gene) =

Male fertility gene in Drosophila

Zeus (aliases Dmel\Rcd-1r, Rcd-1 related/Rcd-1r, CG9573, Drcd-1r/Drcd-1 related) is a male fertility gene in Drosophila, known especially from D. melanogaster and D. simulans. Zeus arose via a retrotransposition from Caf40, a DNA-binding protein. It differs by 107 amino acid substitutions. It retains approximately 30% of Caf40's DNA-binding sites but over the past perhaps 4-6 million years has acquired another 193. These new binding actions regulate hundreds of downstream reproduction related genes. Disruption of this gene disrupts testicle and sperm development.
