= South Side Extension =

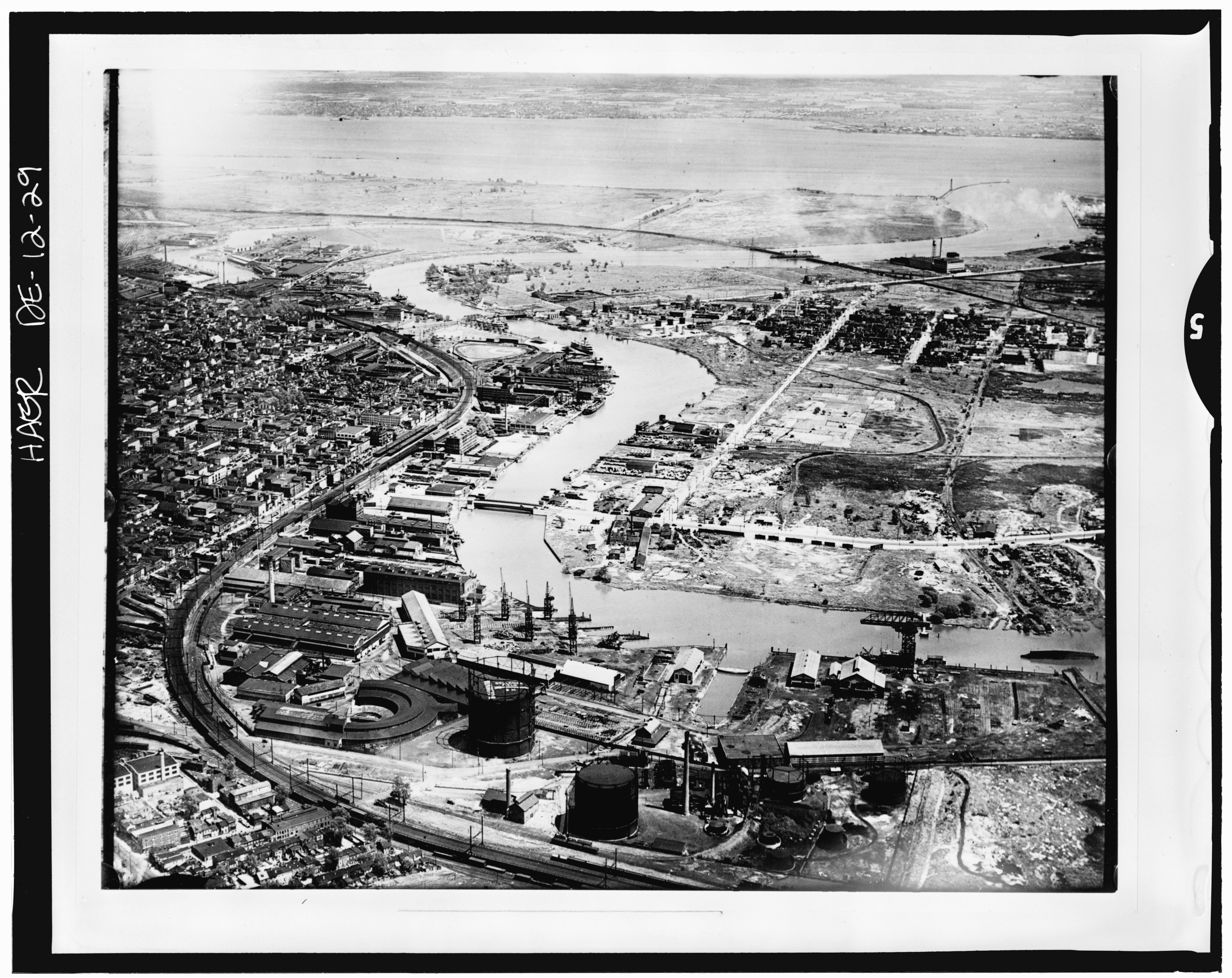
In this image, taken in the early 1930s, the swing bridge (with approach trestles removed) can be seen in the right foreground. Across the river, the extension, now connected to the Reading's South Walnut Street Branch, which it crosses, can be seen running into the Southside neighborhood on C Street.

The South Side Extension of the Baltimore and Ohio Railroad (B&O) was a rail line that ran from its Market Street Branch at West Yard Junction, on the west side of Wilmington, Delaware, across the Christina River to serve industrial areas on the south side of Wilmington.

Originally built by the Delaware Western Railroad and opened in 1872, the line became a branch of the B&O when that railroad bought the Delaware Western to obtain charter rights across Delaware for its new main line to Philadelphia.

Diverging from the Market Street Branch at West Yard Junction, the South Side Extension turned southeast and crossed the Christina River on a swing bridge in the middle of the present Wilmington riverfront. It proceeded down the platted course of C Street to a wye at Bradford Street, and ran up the latter to Christiana Avenue, crossing and running parallel to the avenue as far as the Third Street bridge over the river. A long spur ran from the wye down C Street to the edge of Christiana Avenue. A single-stall enginehouse was built a few blocks west of the wye on C Street.

The B&O showed little interest in developing the South Side Extension, unlike the W&N, which aggressively expanded to serve industries in South Wilmington. It did operate a carfloat service from the Third Street dock at the end of the extension to serve industries on the north side of the river; the service began before 1888 and ended in 1903. An extension of the spur along C Street across Christiana Avenue to the Christiana River would have facilitated a carfloat connection to the Central Railroad of New Jersey, but the branch on the New Jersey side of the Delaware River was never completed. The tracks beyond the wye were largely removed or abandoned in the late 1920s, and the swing bridge was taken out of service around 1930 and removed in the late 1930s. The B&O arranged with the Reading to switch its remaining customers on the south side of the river, and continued to serve a few industries between West Yard Junction and the bridge.
