= Zevs (artist) =

French street artist (born 1977)

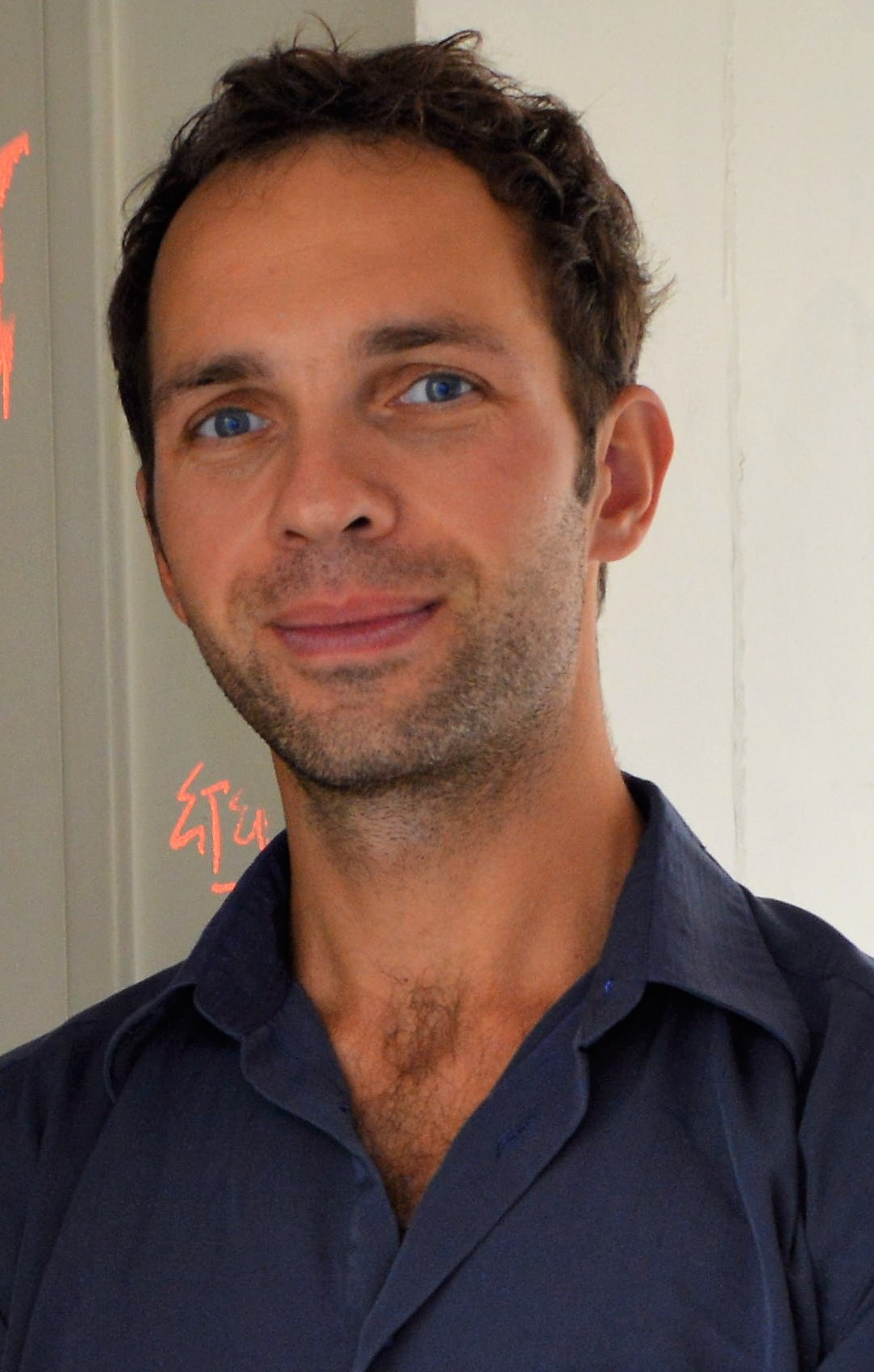
- Portrait of Zevs, 2014
- Born: Christophe Aguirre Schwarz; 17 November 1977 (age 49); Saverne, Bas-Rhin, France
- Style: Liquidation
- Movement: Graffiti
- Website: ZEVS <<<>>> ƧVƎZ on Instagram

Zevs (born Christophe Aguirre Schwarz on 17 November 1977 in Saverne, France) is a French street artist, best known for his trademark "liquidation" technique.

He was an early and influential graffiti artist being active as a tagger in Paris in the 1990s. His pseudonym was taken from the mission code (ZEUS) of an MS 61 operating the RER A, which almost ran him over when he was down in the metro. Working with other French artists in the second half of the 1990s like André and Invader, Zevs has been among the prominent figures who pioneered the French street art scene.

By the end of the 1990s he became known for his poetic drawings of shadows in Paris, shortly after the departure of Facundo Newbery from Paris. Later he 'bombed' models on the billboards between the eyes. Though his interventions have been very popular, it has been discussed in France whether it is vandalism or art.

In 2008 Zevs had his first major survey exhibition at the classical art museum the Ny Carlsberg Glyptotek in Copenhagen, Denmark. His work, including selections of all of his major series to that point, was displayed alongside masterpieces in the museum's permanent collections such as Édouard Manet's The Absinthe Drinker and Auguste Rodin's The Thinker.

== Street art ==
In the early 2000s, Zevs embarked on a campaign of creating "Electric Shadows" on the streets of Paris. In this series, he created outlines of the shadows around common objects on the streets, such as streetlights, benches and entrances to the Paris Metro using spray paint. The original shadows would disappear under daylight, but the Electric Shadows remained as lasting reminders of the city's appearance at night.

In 2002 he cut out a model of a gigantic Lavazza-poster at Alexanderplatz in Berlin. Above the hole in the poster he wrote: "VISUAL KIDNAPPING – PAY NOW!" This intervention not only struck a chord with art lovers and people in Berlin, it has also inspired political activists. Stealing an image from a poster in Germany is now spoken of in the media as a visual kidnapping.

"Visual kidnapping is like entering an interactive game: If the brand on the billboard kidnaps the attention of the public with the purpose of consumer demand, I reverse the situation and I kidnap the model on the poster and I demand a ransom of 500,000€ from the brand. This sum represents the symbolic price of an advertising campaign for the brand."

_{Interview with PingMag, 11 August 2008}

Zevs' Visual Attacks similarly utilized existing advertisements as a means to literally attack commercialism. In these pieces, Zevs painted billboards of major fashion lines, including Gap, H&M and Yves Saint Laurent, so that the models look as if they have been shot.

Zevs has been doing what he calls 'proper graffiti' since the beginning of the 2000s, where he writes on dirty walls with a high pressure jet.

"In the logic of walls made dirty by graffiti, Zevs, the graffiti writer and author of painted shadows has executed proper graffiti. It is about graffiti painted by use of a high pressure jet on walls." _{Alain Milon in Prétentaine, 16/17, Winter 2003–04}

== Liquidated Logos ==
In November 2007 Zevs had his one-man show Liquidated Logos at Lazarides Gallery, London. In 2009, Zevs had this show that was his first solo exhibition in Asia at Hong Kong-based gallery Art Statements, documenting how ZEVS cleverly distorts the logos of big brands. He kickstarted the exhibition by daubing a dripping, black Chanel logo on the outer wall above the window of a Giorgio Armani boutique in central Hong Kong, which led to his arrest and brief imprisonment for damages done to the building.

"Of course, there is a graffiti aesthetic to my art but I primarily play with the visual effect. I use the original colours and re-paint the logo with excess. By pouring paint over them, the logo dissolves in front of the viewer’s eyes, drawing attention to, and visually disturbing the recognisable and omnipresent trademark. By doing so, I try to investigate the logo’s visual power. It’s a simple gesture, just as in Aikido when you reverse the power and change the flow of energy."

_{Interview with PingMag, 11 August 2008}

In 2011 Zevs launched his first solo exhibition in New York, titled "Liquidated Version", in which he continued his artistic commentary on various corporations. Some of the subject matter included many well-known entities such as Coca-Cola, Louis Vuitton and several financial institutions including Morgan Stanley, Merrill Lynch, Lehman Brothers and Goldman Sachs. Many of the works utilize Zevs' trademark liquidation technique, which seems to dissolve the various logos in front of viewers' eyes, creating an overall drippy aesthetic. In addition to these paintings, Zevs also used various other media in this show to present his agenda and create an environment. This exhibition took place from 24 February – 7 April 2011 at De Buck Gallery, with a second show taking place in May 2013. Following his interest for liquidation and dripping logos, in 2016 Zevs created ‘Big Oil Splash’ based on Hockney's 1967 iconic 'Bigger Splash'. The exhibition, hosted at Lazarides Gallery that represents the artist, showcased a series of provocative works targeting globalization and the oil industry.

In September 2016 Zevs's work was featured in a major exhibition at the Château de Vincennes on the outskirts of Paris, called 'Noir Eclair'. Most of the works in the exhibition were specifically conceived for the exhibition and were inspired by the history and features of this historical building.
