= Philadelphia Belt Line Railroad =

The Philadelphia Belt Line Railroad Company
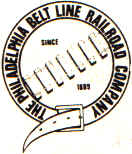

Overview
- Headquarters: Philadelphia, Pennsylvania
- Reporting mark: PBL
- Locale: Philadelphia waterfront
- Dates of operation: 1889–

Technical
- Track gauge: 4 ft 8 1/2 in (1,435 mm) standard gauge
- Length: 2.66 miles

The Philadelphia Belt Line Railroad (reporting mark PBL) owns a 2.66-mile (4.28 km) long railroad line running along the Delaware River waterfront in Philadelphia, Pennsylvania. It was created in 1889 to allow any Philadelphia railroad to access the waterfront. The railroad, which does not operate any trains itself, is currently maintained by Conrail Shared Assets Operations and used by CSX Transportation and Norfolk Southern Railway.

== Operations ==
The Philadelphia Belt Line Railroad (PBL) is a non-operating railroad and exists solely as a real estate holding company. PBL directly owns or has an interest in 6.5 miles of railroad infrastructure plus an additional 10 miles of trackage rights over a joint railroad, as well as other fee simple owned property and right of way within the Port of Philadelphia. Railroad trackage is used by CSX Transportation and Norfolk Southern Railway (NS) to access the Philadelphia waterfront. PBL track is also leased to Conrail Shared Assets Operations (CSAO), who provides line maintenance. North of South Street, CSAO, which serves as a switching company for CSX and NS, has exclusive use of the line.

There is currently little activity on PBL trackage north of the Columbus Boulevard ports on the Delaware River near Southwark; however, projects are being proposed and considered that will, if put through and take action on, significantly increase the line's freight traffic. Currently underway is a deal with Kinder Morgan to transport large tanker car trains of liquified natural gas (LNG) from western Pennsylvania to tanker ships at Tioga Marine Terminal in northern Philadelphia. Another project is the proposed Southport in what is now the abandoned northern portion of the Philadelphia Naval Shipyard. The project it will transport container traffic, adjacent to CSX's South Philadelphia Yard. A third project is passenger service to the Live! Hotel and Casino Philadelphia in south Philadelphia. Proposed service would operate in the median of Delaware Avenue/Columbus Bouelvard along the Delaware River waterfront, including the resurfaced section between Spring Garden Street and Allegheny Avenue near Port Richmond Yard is.

== History ==
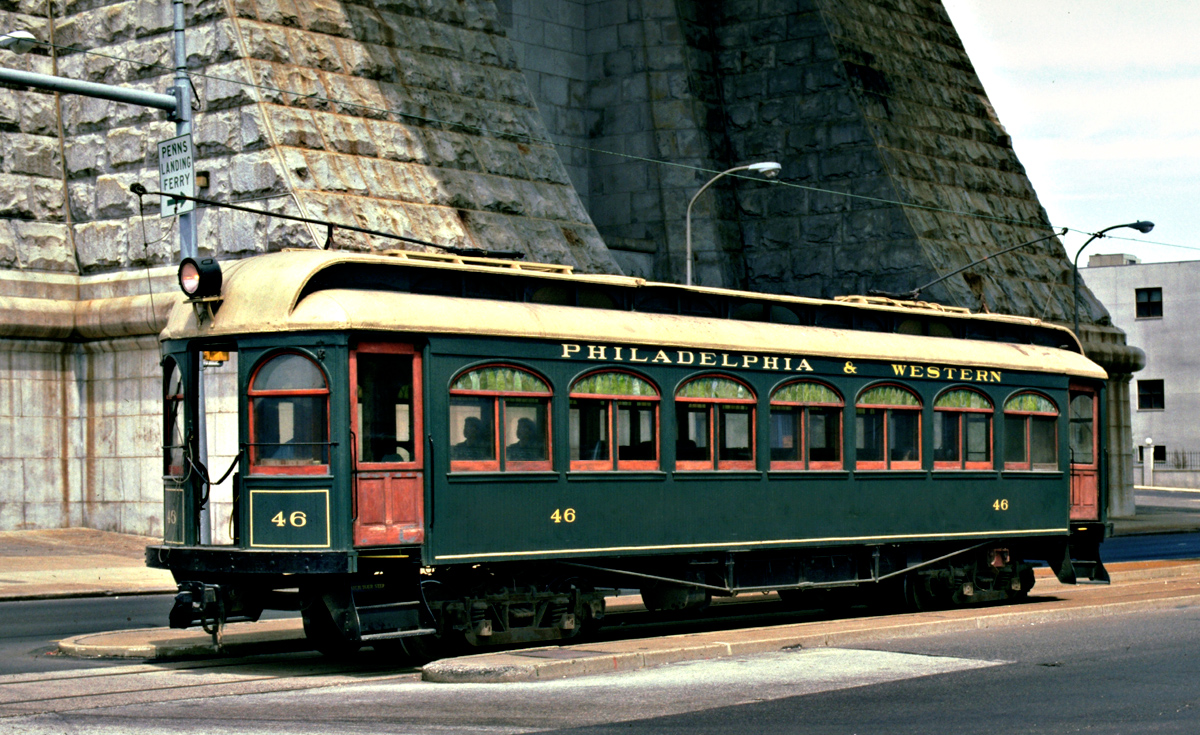
A 1907 interurban car on the former trolley line, in 1990.

PBL was created in 1889 with the purpose of allowing any Philadelphia railroad to have access to the Port of Philadelphia. The railroad was used as a way to fight the railroad empire of the Pennsylvania Railroad (PRR), trying to bring other railroads to gain access to the Philadelphia waterfront via a right-of-way that PRR not yet taken. From September 5, 1982 to December 17, 1995, a heritage trolley using historic cars operated along the tracks in the Penn's Landing area between the Benjamin Franklin Bridge and Pier 51. The trolley used newly installed overhead wires and poles and was operated by the Buckingham Valley Trolley Association. Wires and poles were dismantled shortly after service ceased.

In 2009 PBL sued the developer of SugarHouse Casino for building on property on which the city had granted to PBL in 1890. While the lawsuit was pending, PBL petitioned the Surface Transportation Board (STB) for a declaratory order confirming that PBL retained its right-of-way and would continue to do so unless STB granted an application for abandonment of that rail line. STB ultimately denied the petition, finding that PBL had neither constructed nor operated a rail line on the property being used by SugarHouse and that it had presented no evidence that it had failed to support its argument "that a right-of-way granted by a municipality, but never exercised or developed or otherwise perfected under the Transportation Act of 1920 . . . must be authorized to be abandoned [by the Board under 49 U.S.C.] §10903 before it may be dissolved."
