= Tim Finin =

American computer scientist

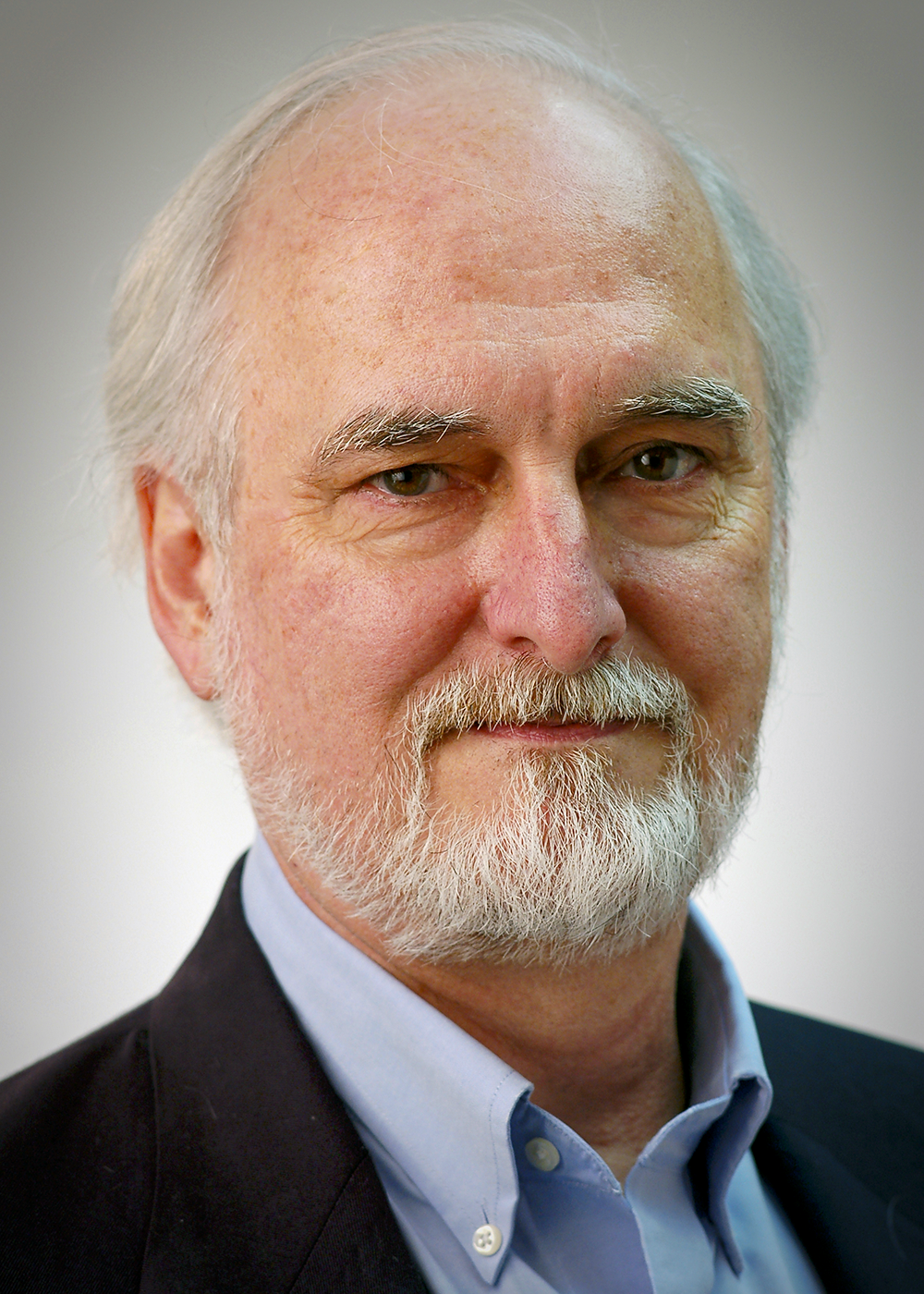
- Born: August 4, 1949 (age 77); Walworth, Wisconsin, United States
- Occupation: Professor
- Known for: KQML, Swoogle
- Awards: ACM Fellow, AAAI Fellow, FIPA Fellow

Academic background
- Education: MIT, University of Illinois
- Alma mater: University of Illinois
- Thesis: The Semantic Interpretation of Compound Nominals (1980)
- Doctoral advisor: David Waltz

Academic work
- Era: Anthropocene
- Discipline: Computer science
- Sub-discipline: Artificial intelligence, Semantic web, Natural language processing, Social media, Mobile computing
- Institutions: UMBC, Unisys, University of Pennsylvania, MIT, JHU
- Notable ideas: Agent Communications Language
- Website: umbc.edu/~finin

Timothy Wilking Finin (born August 4, 1949) is an Emeritus Professor in the Computer Science and Electrical Engineering department and founding director of the Center for Artificial Intelligence at the University of Maryland, Baltimore County (UMBC). His research has focused on the applications of artificial intelligence to problems in information systems and has included contributions to natural language processing, expert systems, the theory and applications of multiagent systems, the semantic web, and mobile computing.

== Education ==
Finin earned an undergraduate degree in Electrical Engineering from MIT in 1971 and a PhD in Computer Science from the University of Illinois at Urbana–Champaign in 1980.

== Career ==
Prior to joining the UMBC in 1991 as chair of its Computer Science Department, he held positions at the Unisys Paoli Research Center, the University of Pennsylvania, and the MIT Artificial Intelligence Laboratory. From 2007 to 2025 he was an affiliate faculty member at the Human Language Technology Center of Excellence at Johns Hopkins University. He is the author of more than 500 refereed publications and has received research grants and contracts from a variety of sources.

He has been an organizer of several major conferences, including the IEEE Conference on Artificial Intelligence for Applications, ACM Conference on Information and Knowledge Management, ACM Autonomous Agents conference, ACM Conference on Mobile and Ubiquitous Computing, International Semantic Web Conference and IEEE International Conference on Intelligence and Security Informatics. He served as an editor in chief of the Journal of Web Semantics from 2005 to 2016, as the co-editor of the Viewpoints section of Communications of the ACM from 2013 to 2022, and is currently on the editorial board of several other journals. Finin is a former AAAI councilor and former board member of the Computing Research Association.

== Awards ==
In 1997 he was selected as a fellow of the Foundation for Intelligent Physical Agents for his work on agent communication languages. He received the Edward J. McCluskey Technical Achievement Award from the IEEE Computer Society in 2009 "for pioneering contributions to distributed intelligent systems". In 2012 he was selected as UMBC's Presidential Research Professor for the three-year term 2012–2015. In 2013 he was named a fellow of the Association for the Advancement of Artificial Intelligence for "significant contributions to the theory and practice of knowledge sharing in multiagent systems and on the Web, and for sustained service to the AI community". In 2018, the Association for Computing Machinery named him an ACM Fellow for his contributions to the theory and practice of knowledge sharing in distributed systems and the World Wide Web.. In 2026 he received a Distinguished Career Award in Computer Science from the Washington Academy of Sciences, and was made a Fellow by International Academy of Artificial Intelligence Sciences.
