= ICAART =

The International Conference on Agents and Artificial Intelligence (ICAART) is a meeting point for researchers (among others) with interest in the areas of Agents and Artificial Intelligence. There are 2 tracks in ICAART, one related to Agents and Distributed AI in general and the other one focused in topics related to Intelligent Systems and Computational Intelligence.

The conference program is composed of several different kind of sessions like technical sessions, poster sessions, keynote lectures, tutorials, special sessions, doctoral consortiums, panels and industrial tracks. The papers presented in the conference are made available at the SCITEPRESS digital library, published in the conference proceedings and some of the best papers are invited to a post-publication with Springer.

ICAART's first edition was in 2009 counting with several keynote speakers like Marco Dorigo, Edward H. Shortliffe and Eduard Hovy. Since then, the conference had several other invited speakers like Katia Sycara, Nick Jennings, Robert Kowalski, Boi Faltings and Tim Finin. Bart Selman is one of the names confirmed for the next edition of this conference.

Since 2012 the conference is held in conjunction with 2 other conferences: the International Conference on Operations Research and Enterprise Systems (ICORES) and the International Conference on Pattern Recognition Applications and Methods (ICPRAM).

== Areas ==
=== Agents ===
- Agent communication languages
- Cooperation and Coordination
- Distributed Problem Solving
- Economic Agent Models
- Emotional Intelligence
- Group Decision Making
- Intelligent Auctions and Markets
- Mobile Agents
- Multi-agent systems
- Negotiation and Interaction Protocols
- Nep News Detection
- Agent Models and Architectures
- Physical Agents at Work
- Privacy, Safety and Security
- Programming Environments and Languages
- Robot and Multi-Robot Systems
- Self Organizing Systems
- Semantic Web
- Simulation
- Swarm Intelligence
- Task Planning and Execution
- Transparency and Ethical Issues
- Agent-Oriented Software Engineering
- Web Intelligence
- Agent Platforms and Interoperability
- Autonomous systems
- Cloud Computing and Its Impact
- Cognitive robotics
- Collective Intelligence
- Conversational Agents

=== Artificial intelligence ===
- AI and Creativity
- Deep Learning
- Evolutionary Computing
- Fuzzy Systems
- Hybrid Intelligent Systems
- Industrial Applications of AI
- Intelligence and Cybersecurity
- Intelligent User Interfaces
- Knowledge Representation and Reasoning
- Knowledge-Based Systems
- Ambient Intelligence
- Machine learning
- Model-Based Reasoning
- Natural Language Processing
- Neural Networks
- Ontologies
- Planning and Scheduling
- Social Network Analysis
- Soft Computing
- State Space Search
- Bayesian Networks
- Uncertainty in AI
- Vision and Perception
- Visualization
- Big Data
- Case-Based Reasoning
- Cognitive Systems
- Constraint Satisfaction
- Data Mining
- Data Science

== Editions ==
=== ICAART 2019 – Prague, Czech Republic ===
Proceedings - Proceedings of the 11th International Conference on Web Information Systems and Technologies - Volume 1. ISBN 978-989-758-350-6
Proceedings - Proceedings of the 11th International Conference on Web Information Systems and Technologies - Volume 2. ISBN 978-989-758-350-6

=== ICAART 2018 – Funchal, Madeira, Portugal ===
Proceedings - Proceedings of the 10th International Conference on Web Information Systems and Technologies - Volume 1. ISBN 978-989-758-275-2
Proceedings - Proceedings of the 10th International Conference on Web Information Systems and Technologies - Volume 2. ISBN 978-989-758-275-2

=== ICAART 2017 – Porto, Portugal ===
Proceedings - Proceedings of the 9th International Conference on Web Information Systems and Technologies - Volume 1. ISBN 978-989-758-219-6
Proceedings - Proceedings of the 9th International Conference on Web Information Systems and Technologies - Volume 2. ISBN 978-989-758-220-2

=== ICAART 2016 – Rome, Italy ===
Proceedings - Proceedings of the 8th International Conference on Web Information Systems and Technologies - Volume 1. ISBN 978-989-758-172-4
Proceedings - Proceedings of the 8th International Conference on Web Information Systems and Technologies - Volume 2. ISBN 978-989-758-172-4

=== ICAART 2015 – Lisbon, Portugal ===
Proceedings - Proceedings of the 7th International Conference on Web Information Systems and Technologies - Volume 1. ISBN 978-989-758-073-4
Proceedings - Proceedings of the 7th International Conference on Web Information Systems and Technologies - Volume 2. ISBN 978-989-758-074-1

=== ICAART 2014 – ESEO, Angers, Loire Valley, France ===
Proceedings - Proceedings of the 6th International Conference on Web Information Systems and Technologies - Volume 1. ISBN 978-989-758-015-4
Proceedings - Proceedings of the 6th International Conference on Web Information Systems and Technologies - Volume 2. ISBN 978-989-758-016-1

=== ICAART 2013 – Barcelona, Spain ===
Proceedings - Proceedings of the 5th International Conference on Web Information Systems and Technologies - Volume 1. ISBN 978-989-8565-38-9
Proceedings - Proceedings of the 5th International Conference on Web Information Systems and Technologies - Volume 2. ISBN 978-989-8565-39-6

=== ICAART 2012 – Vilamoura, Algarve, Portugal ===
Proceedings - Proceedings of the 4th International Conference on Web Information Systems and Technologies - Volume 1. ISBN 978-989-8425-95-9
Proceedings - Proceedings of the 4th International Conference on Web Information Systems and Technologies - Volume 2. ISBN 978-989-8425-96-6

=== ICAART 2011 – Rome, Italy ===
Proceedings - Proceedings of the 3rd International Conference on Web Information Systems and Technologies - Volume 1. ISBN 978-989-8425-40-9
Proceedings - Proceedings of the 3rd International Conference on Web Information Systems and Technologies - Volume 2. ISBN 978-989-8425-41-6

=== ICAART 2010 – Valencia, Spain ===
Proceedings - Proceedings of the 2nd International Conference on Web Information Systems and Technologies - Volume 1. ISBN 978-989-674-021-4
Proceedings - Proceedings of the 2nd International Conference on Web Information Systems and Technologies - Volume 2. ISBN 978-989-674-022-1

=== ICAART 2009 – Porto, Portugal ===
Proceedings - Proceedings of the 1st International Conference on Web Information Systems and Technologies. ISBN 978-989-8111-66-1
