= Deliberative =

Deliberative may refer to:

- Deliberative agent
- Deliberative assembly
- Deliberative Council of Princes and Ministers
- Deliberative democracy
- Deliberative mood
- Deliberative opinion poll
- Deliberative planning
- Deliberative process privilege
- Deliberative referendum
- Deliberative rhetoric
