= Agent mining =

Computer science research field

Agent mining is a research field that combines two areas of computer science: multiagent systems and data mining. It explores how intelligent computer agents can work together to discover, analyze, and learn from large amounts of data more effectively than traditional methods.

== Historical context ==
The interaction and the integration between multiagent systems and data mining have a long history. The very early work on agent mining focused on agent-based knowledge discovery, agent-based distributed data mining, and agent-based distributed machine learning, and using data mining to enhance agent intelligence.

The International Workshop on Agents and Data Mining Interaction has been held for more than 10 times, co-located with the International Conference on Autonomous Agents and Multi-Agent Systems. Several proceedings are available from Springer Lecture Notes in Computer Science.

== See also ==
- Distributed artificial intelligence
