= ICORES =

The International Conference on Operations Research and Enterprise Systems (ICORES) is an annual conference in the field of operations research. Two tracks are held simultaneously, covering domain independent methodologies and technologies and also practical work developed in specific application areas. These tracks are present in the conference not only in technical sessions but also in poster sessions, keynote lectures and tutorials.

The works presented in the conference are published in the conference proceedings and are made available at the SCITEPRESS digital library. Usually, it's established a cooperation with Springer for a post-publication with some of the conference best papers. The first edition of ICORES was held in 2012 in conjunction with the International Conference on Agents and Artificial Intelligence (ICAART) and the International Conference on Pattern Recognition Applications and Methods (ICPRAM).

== Areas ==
=== Methodologies and Technologies ===
- Analytics for Enterprise (Engineering) Systems
- Inventory theory
- Linear programming
- Management sciences
- Network optimization
- Optimization
- Predictive analytics
- Queuing theory
- Simulation
- Stochastic optimization
- Data mining and business analytics
- Decision analysis
- Design in ES (E.G., Real Options for Flexible Design, Etc)
- Dynamic programming
- Forecasting
- Game theory
- Industrial engineering
- Information systems

=== Applications ===
- Automation of operations
- OR in education
- OR in emergency management
- OR in health
- OR in national defense/international security
- OR in telecommunications
- OR in transportation
- Project management
- Resource allocation
- Risk management
- Routing
- Decision support systems
- Scheduling
- Supply chain management
- Systems of systems/teams and socio-technical systems
- Energy and environment
- Engines for innovation
- Globalization and Productivity
- Logistics
- Maintenance
- New applications of OR
- Optimization in finance

== Current chairs ==
=== Conference Chair ===
Marc Demange, RMIT University, School of Science - Mathematical Sciences, Australia

=== Program Co-Chairs ===
- Greg H. Parlier, NCSU, United States
- Federico Liberatore, Cardiff University, United Kingdom

== Editions ==
=== ICORES 2019 - Prague, Czech Republic ===
Proceedings - Proceedings of the International Conference on Operations Research and Enterprise Systems. ISBN 978-989-758-352-0

==== Best paper award ====
Area: Methodologies and Technologies - Rainer Schlosser. "Stochastic Dynamic Pricing with Strategic Customers and Reference Price Effects"

Area: Methodologies and Technologies - Sally I. McClean, David A. Stanford, Lalit Garg and Naveed Khan. "Using Phase-type Models to Monitor and Predict Process Target Compliance"

==== Best Student Paper Award ====
Area: Methodologies and Technologies - Marek Vlk, Antonin Novak and Zdenek Hanzalek. "Makespan Minimization with Sequence-dependent Non-overlapping Setups"

==== Best poster award ====
Area: Applications - Clémence Bisot. "Dynamic Linear Assignment for Pairing Two Parts in Production - A Case Study in Aeronautics Industry"

Area: Methodologies and Technologies - Maria E. Bruni, Lorenzo Brusco, Giuseppe Ielpa and Patrizia Beraldi. "The Risk-averse Profitable Tour Problem"

=== ICORES 2018 - Funchal, Madeira, Portugal ===
Proceedings - Proceedings of the International Conference on Operations Research and Enterprise Systems. ISBN 978-989-758-285-1

==== Best paper award ====
Area: Methodologies and Technologies - Rainer Schlosser and Keven Richly. "Dynamic Pricing Strategies in a Finite Horizon Duopoly with Partial Information"

==== Best student paper award ====
Area: Methodologies and Technologies - Claudio Arbib, Fabrizio Marinelli, Andrea Pizzuti and Roberto Rosetti. "A Heuristic for a Rich and Real Two-dimensional Woodboard Cutting Problem"

==== Best poster award ====
Area: Applications - Clémence Bisot. "Dynamic Linear Assignment for Pairing Two Parts in Production - A Case Study in Aeronautics Industry"

Area: Methodologies and Technologies - Maria Elena Bruni, Luigi Di Puglia Pugliese, Patrizia Beraldi and Francesca Guerriero. "A Two-stage Stochastic Programming Model for the Resource Constrained Project Scheduling Problem under Uncertainty"

=== ICORES 2017 - Porto, Portugal ===
Proceedings - Proceedings of the International Conference on Operations Research and Enterprise Systems. ISBN 978-989-758-218-9

==== Best paper award ====
Area: Methodologies and Technologies - Michael Dreyfuss and Yahel Giat. "Optimizing Spare Battery Allocation in an Electric Vehicle Battery Swapping System"

==== Best student paper award ====
Area: Applications - Martina Fischetti and David Pisinger. "On the Impact of using Mixed Integer Programming Techniques on Real-world Offshore Wind Parks"

==== Best poster award ====
Area: Applications - Alexander Hämmerle and Georg Weichhart. "Variable Neighbourhood Search Solving Sub-problems of a Lagrangian Flexible Scheduling Problem"

=== ICORES 2016 - Lisbon, Portugal ===
Proceedings - Proceedings of the International Conference on Operations Research and Enterprise Systems. ISBN 978-989-758-171-7

==== Best paper award ====
Area: Applications - Yujie Chen, Fiona Polack, Peter Cowling, Philip Mourdjis and Stephen Remde. "Risk Driven Analysis of Maintenance for a Large-scale Drainage System"

Area: Methodologies and Technologies - Vikas Vikram Singh, Oualid Jouini and Abdel Lisser. "A Complementarity Problem Formulation for Chance-constraine Games"

==== Best student paper award ====
Area: Applications - Jose L. Saez and Victor M. Albornoz. "Delineation of Rectangular Management Zones Under Uncertainty Conditions"

==== Best PhD project award ====
Parisa Madhooshiarzanagh. "Preference Dissagrigation Model of ELECTRE TRI-NC and Its Application on Identifying Preferred Climates for Tourism".

=== ICORES 2015 - Lisbon, Portugal ===
Proceedings - Proceedings of the International Conference on Operations Research and Enterprise Systems. ISBN 978-989-758-075-8

==== Best paper award ====
Area: Applications - L. Berghman, C. Briand, R. Leus and P. Lopez. "The Truck Scheduling Problem at Crossdocking Terminals"

Area: Methodologies and Technologies - Kailiang Xu and Gang Zheng. "Schedule Two-machine Flow-shop with Controllable Processing Times Using Tabu-search"

==== Best student paper award ====
Area: Applications - Wasakorn Laesanklang, Dario Landa-Silva and J. Arturo Castillo Salazar. "Mixed Integer Programming with Decomposition to Solve a Workforce Scheduling and Routing Problem"

Area: Methodologies and Technologies - Jan Bok and Milan Hladík. "Selection-based Approach to Cooperative Interval Games"

==== Best PhD project award ====
Nigel M. Clay, John Hearne, Babak Abbasi and Andrew Eberhard. "Ensuring Blood is Available When it is Needed Most"

Sandy Jorens, Annelies De Corte, Kenneth Sörensen and Gunther Steenackers. "The Air Distribution Network Design Problem - A Complex Non-linear Combinatorial Optimization Problem "

=== ICORES 2014 - ESEO, Angers, Loire Valley, France ===
Proceedings - Proceedings of the 3rd International Conference on Operations Research and Enterprise Systems. ISBN 978-989-758-017-8

==== Best paper award ====
Area: Applications - Céline Gicquel and Michel Minoux. "New Multi-product Valid Inequalities for a Discrete Lot-sizing Problem"

Area: Methodologies and Technologies - Nadia Chaabane Fakhfakh, Cyril Briand and Marie-José Huguet. "A Multi-Agent Min-Cost Flow problem with Controllable Capacities"

==== Best student paper award ====
Area: Applications - Nhat-Vinh Vo, Pauline Fouillet and Christophe Lenté. "General Lower Bounds for the Total Completion Time in a Flowshop Scheduling Problem"

Area: Methodologies and Technologies - António Quintino, João Carlos Lourenço and Margarida Catalão-Lopes. "Managing Price Risk for an Oil and Gas Company"

==== Best PhD project award ====
Laura Wagner and Mustafa Çagri Gürbüz. "Sourcing Decisions for Goods with Potentially Imperfect Quality under the Presence of Supply Disruption "

=== ICORES 2013 - Barcelona, Spain ===
Proceedings - Proceedings of the 2nd International Conference on Operations Research and Enterprise Systems. ISBN 978-989-8565-40-2

==== Best paper award ====
Area: Applications - Daniel Reich, Sandra L. Winkler and Erica Klampfl. "The Pareto Frontier for Vehicle Fleet Purchases"

Area: Methodologies and Technologies - N. Perel, J. L. Dorsman and M. Vlasiou. "Cyclic-type Polling Models with Preparation Times"

==== Best student paper award ====
Area: Applications - Ahmad Almuhtady, Seungchul Lee, Edwin Romeijn and Jun Ni. "A Maintenance-optimal Swapping Policy"

Area: Methodologies and Technologies - Pablo Adasme, Abdel Lisser and Chen Wang. "A Distributionally Robust Formulation for Stochastic Quadratic Bi-level Programming"

=== ICORES 2012 - Vilamoura, Algarve, Portugal ===
Proceedings - Proceedings of the 1st International Conference on Operations Research and Enterprise Systems. ISBN 978-989-8425-97-3

==== Best paper award ====
Area: Applications - Rita Macedo, Saïd Hanafi, François Clautiaux, Cláudio Alves and J. M. Valério de Carvalho. "GENERALIZED DISAGGREGATION ALGORITHM FOR THE VEHICLE ROUTING PROBLEM WITH TIME WINDOWS AND MULTIPLE ROUTES"

Area: Methodologies and Technologies - Herwig Bruneel, Willem Mélange, Bart Steyaert, Dieter Claeys and Joris Walraevens. "IMPACT OF BLOCKING WHEN CUSTOMERS OF DIFFERENT CLASSES ARE ACCOMMODATED IN ONE COMMON QUEUE"

==== Best student paper award ====
Area: Applications - Jianqiang Cheng, Stefanie Kosuch and Abdel Lisser. "STOCHASTIC SHORTEST PATH PROBLEM WITH UNCERTAIN DELAYS"

Area: Methodologies and Technologies - A. Papayiannis, P. Johnson, D. Yumashev, S. Howell, N. Proudlove and P. Duck. "CONTINUOUS-TIME REVENUE MANAGEMENT IN CARPARKS"
