= CNP =

CNP may refer to:

== Organizations ==
- California National Party, a center-left secessionist political party
- Cambodian National Police
- Canadian Nationalist Party (2017), a white nationalist political party
- CenterPoint Energy, (ticker symbol CNP), an electric and natural gas utility
- Chinese Nationalist Party (Kuomintang), a center-right political party in the Republic of China on Taiwan
- Chinese New Party, the former name of the New Party, a political party in the Republic of China on Taiwan
- CNP Assurances, a French insurance corporation
- CNP (Carbon, Nitrogen, and Phosphorus), a US biosolids processing systems company
- Colombian National Police
- Cornish Nationalist Party, an unregistered political party in the U.K.
- Council for National Policy, a US right-wing nonprofit political network
- Counter Narcotics Police of Afghanistan
- Cuerpo Nacional de Policía, the Spanish police
- NPM/CNP (Compagnie Nationale à Portefeuille SA), a Belgian non-listed holding company

== Science and medicine ==
- Certified nurse practitioner
- Calcifying nanoparticle, or nanobacterium, a proposed class of living organisms
- 2',3'-Cyclic-nucleotide 3'-phosphodiesterase, a myelin-associated enzyme
- Chronic nonbacterial prostatitis, a pelvic pain condition
- C-type natriuretic peptide, a vasoactive hormone

== Technology ==
- Certified Network Professional, a designation of the Network Professional Association
- Nerlerit Inaat Airport (IATA airport code CNP), Jameson Land, Greenland
- The UK National Rail code for Conway Park railway station, Merseyside
- Contract Net Protocol, for computer task-sharing

== Other uses ==
- Card-not-present transaction, for payment cards
- Certified Nonprofit Professional, a professional designation in the US
- cNp, centineper, a submultiple of the neper logarithmic unit of ratio
- CnP, short for clinch and pound, a mixed martial arts tactic
- Chief of Naval Personnel, in the US
- Comprehensive National Power, an index of state power used by the People's Republic of China
- Personal Numeric Code (Romania), a national identification number
