= Place identity =

Idea about a place and identity

Place identity or place-based identity refers to a cluster of ideas about place and identity in the fields of geography, urban planning, urban design, environmental psychology, ecocriticism and urban sociology/ecological sociology. Place identity is sometimes called urban character, neighbourhood character or local character. Place identity has become a significant issue in the last 50 years in urban planning and design. Place identity concerns the meaning and significance of places for their inhabitants and users, and how these meanings contribute to individuals' conceptualizations of self. Place identity also relates to the context of modernity, history and the politics of representation. In other words, historical determinism, which intersects historical events, social spaces and groups by gender, class, ethnicity. In this way, it explores how spaces have evolved over time by exploring the social constructs through time and the development of space, place and power. To the same extent, the politics of representation is brought into context, as the making of place identity in a community also relates to the exclusion or inclusion in a community. Through this, some have argued that place identity has become an area for social change because it gives marginalized communities agency over their own spaces. In the same respect, it is argued that place identity has also been used to intervene social change and perpetuate oppression from a top-down approach by creating segregated spaces for marginalized communities.

== Place attachment and sense of place ==
In some ways it is related to the concepts of place attachment and sense of place. Place identity is largely related to the concepts of community formation because it recognizes that geographical spaces do not solely bond a community together but rather there are social bonds that account for community formation. Those social forces often are feelings of belonging and security, which involve theoretical formations of community. Theoretical formations of community, which were identified in Community: Seeking Safety in an Insecure World (Bauman, 2001) act as bonds formed by similar locality, culture, language, kinship and/or experiences. In addition, identity also conceptualizes feelings of security and freedom as one is able to self-identify and especially when it comes to being able to foster agency over community formation. In addition, the similar and shared experiences of culture, language and locality foster the sense of community. This fostering of community is largely seen as an extension of agency because when a community is able to achieve a sense of place and place attachment, this allows for individuals to reinforce their own identities and strengthen their bonds within their community.

== Methodology ==
Methodologies for understanding place identity primarily involve qualitative techniques, such as interviewing, participant observation, discourse analysis and mapping a range of physical elements. Some urban planners, urban designers and landscape architects use forms of deliberative planning, design charettes and participatory design with local communities as a way of working with place identity to transform existing places as well as create new ones. This kind of planning and design process is sometimes referred to as placemaking.

=== Case studies ===
The following case studies are examples of how place identity is researched on the field and the specifics attached to them.

==== Cape Cod, Massachusetts ====
In a study by Lee Cuba and David M. Hummon (1993), they focus on Cape Cod, Massachusetts, residents and how social and environmental factors are associated with place identity. Place identity in regards to "at-homeness" was defined by existence, affiliations, and locus. Community members were asked if they feel at home in Cape Cod to measure the positive responses for existence. The open-ended responses to why community members feel at home were used to measure place affiliation. A close-ended question, "Do you associate feeling at home with living in this particular house or apartment, with living in this community, or with living on the Cape, in general?" was used to measure locus. Most respondents reported they did feel "at home".

==== Michigan and the Great Lakes ====
Michigan and the Great Lakes are analyzed to see the values and connections shared within the residents of Michigan. A questionnaire was given to Michigan residents to see how attached the residents are. The questionnaire consisted of statements and the statements were evaluated through the five-point Likert scale. As a result, the data revealed "Michigan's voters have developed a strong sense of place regarding the state".

These two case studies shows that place has a lot more to offer than just a physical location. Understanding how to measure a sense of place assists policy makers in decision making and in creating potential policy implementation. Policymakers will take the community's issues into consideration during the planning process earlier and more thoroughly once they understand the values of a community in relation to place identity...

== See also ==
- Community of place, a community of people bound together because of where they frequently spend time
- Nature connectedness, the extent to which individuals include nature as part of their identity
- Neighborhood character, the look and feel of an area
- Social architecture, design of an environment to encourage desired social behaviors
- Urban vitality, the quality of spaces in cities that attract people

== General references ==
- Cuba, L. & Hummon, D.M. (1993). A place to call home: Identification with dwelling, community, and region. The Sociological Quarterly, 34 (1), 111-131.
- Hague, C. and Jenkins, P. (Eds) (2005). Place identity, planning and participation, London; New York : Routledge, 2005. ISBN 0-415-26241-0 (hard cover) 0415262429 (soft cover) 0203646754 (ebook)
- Proshansky, H. M. (1978). 'The city and self-identity', Journal of Environment and Behaviour, Vol. 10, pp. 57–83
- Nanzer, B. (2004). Measuring sense of place: A scale of Michigan. Administrative Theory & Praxis, 26 (3), 362-382.
- Proshansky, H. M., Fabian, A. K. and Kaminoff, R. (1983). 'Place-identity: Physical world socialization of the self', Journal of Environmental Psychology, Vol. 3, pp. 57–83
- Relph, E (1976) Place and placelessness. London: Pion, 1976 (ISBN 0850860555)
