= PCGS =

PCGS may refer to:

- Parallel communicating grammar systems, grammar systems working on their own string and communicating with other grammars in a system by sending their sequential forms on request.
- Preconditioned conjugate gradient square method, a variant of the preconditioned conjugate gradient method – an algorithm for the numerical solution of systems of linear equations whose matrix is symmetric and positive-definite.
- Professional Coin Grading Service, an authentication and grading service for rare coins started by seven coin dealers in 1985 to standardize coin grading.
