= Knowledge Interchange Format =

Knowledge Interchange Format (KIF) is a computer language designed to enable systems to share and re-use information from knowledge-based systems. KIF is similar to frame languages such as KL-One and LOOM but unlike such language its primary role is not intended as a framework for the expression or use of knowledge but rather for the interchange of knowledge between systems. The designers of KIF likened it to PostScript. PostScript was not designed primarily as a language to store and manipulate documents but rather as an interchange format for systems and devices to share documents. In the same way KIF is meant to facilitate sharing of knowledge across different systems that use different languages, formalisms, platforms, etc.

KIF has a declarative semantics. It is meant to describe facts about the world rather than processes or procedures. Knowledge can be described as objects, functions, relations, and rules. It is a formal language, i.e., it can express arbitrary statements in first order logic and can support reasoners that can prove the consistency of a set of KIF statements. KIF also supports non-monotonic reasoning. KIF was created by Michael Genesereth, Richard Fikes and others participating in the DARPA knowledge sharing Effort.

Although the original KIF group intended to submit to a formal standards body, that did not occur. A later version called Common Logic has since been developed for submission to ISO and has been approved and published. A variant called SUO-KIF is the language in which the Suggested Upper Merged Ontology is written.

A practical application of the Knowledge interchange format is an agent communication language in a multi-agent system.

== See also ==
- Knowledge Query and Manipulation Language
