= Distributed intelligence =

Distributed intelligence may refer to:

- Group mind (science fiction)
- Collective intelligence, superorganism
- Distributed artificial intelligence, innovation system
