= Java Agent Development Framework =

Software framework

JADE
- Stable release: 4.6.0 / December 19, 2022; 3 years ago
- Written in: Java
- Platform: Java SE
- Type: Multi-agent system, software framework
- License: GNU Lesser General Public License
- Website: jade-project.gitlab.io

Java Agent Development Framework, or JADE, is a software framework for the development of software agents, implemented in Java. JADE system supports coordination between several agents FIPA and provides a standard implementation of the communication language FIPA-ACL, which facilitates the communication between agents and allows the services detection of the system. JADE was originally developed by Telecom Italia and is distributed as free software.

== Resume ==
JADE is a middleware which facilitates the development of multi-agent systems under the standard FIPA for which purpose it creates multiple containers for agents, each of them can run on one or more systems. It's understood that a set of containers constitutes a platform.

JADE provides:

- An environment where JADE agents are executed
- Class libraries to create agents using heritage and redefinition of behaviors
- A graphical toolkit to monitoring and managing the platform of intelligent agents

== History ==
JADE was initially developed by Telecom Italia Lab. This sector is the R & D branch of Telecom Italia Group which is responsible for promoting technological innovation. Telecom Italia conceived and promoted JADE by basing it in 2000. The latest available dates from December 2022 (version 4.6.0). The first version of JADE distributed as free software is available from February 2000 (versión 1.3).

In March 2003 Motorola and Telecom Italia created the JADE Governing Board with the objective of promoting the development and adoption of JADE in the mobile telecommunications industry as middleware based. The JADE Governing Board accepts any company and/or organization interested in the commercial use and exploitation of JADE to commit to its development and promotion.

In 2021, the team that successfully developed JADE announced that they could not continue to work on it anymore. A team of researchers forked it is now pursuing the platform development.

== Platform ==
JADE is a distributed agents platform, which has a container for each host where you are running the agents. Additionally, the platform has various debugging tools, mobility of code and content agents, the possibility of parallel execution of the behavior of agents, as well as support for the definition of languages and ontologies. Each platform must have a parent container that has two special agents called AMS and DF.

- The DF (Directory Facilitator) provides a directory which announces which agents are available on the platform.
- The AMS (Agent Management System) controls the platform. It is the only one who can create and destroy other agents, destroy containers and stop the platform.

=== DF Agent ===
To access the DF agent the class "jade.domain.DFService" and its static methods are used: register, deregister, modify and Search.

=== AMS agent ===
To access the AMS Service an agent is created which automatically runs the register method of the AMS by default before executing the method setup from the new agent. When an agent is destroyed it executes its takeDown() method by default and automatically calls the deregister method of the AMS.

== Agent class ==
The Agent class is a superclass which allows the users to create JADE agents. To create an agent one needs to inherit directly from Agent. Normally, each agent recorder several services which they should be implemented by one or more behaviors.

This class provides methods to perform the basic tasks of the agents as:

- Pass messages by objects ACLMessage, with pattern matching
- Support the life cycle of an agent
- Plan and execute multiple activities at the same time

== JADE agent ==
The cycle of life of a JADE agent follows the cycle proposed by FIPA. These agents go through different states defined as:

1. Initiated: The agent has been created but has not registered yet the AMS.
2. Active: The agent has been registered and has a name. In this state, it can communicate with other agents.
3. Suspended: The agent is stopped because its thread is suspended.
4. Waiting: The agent is blocked waiting for an event.
5. Deleted: The agent has finished and his thread ended his execute and there is not any more in the AMS.
6. Transit: The agent is moving to a new location.

== Agents' behaviour ==
The behavior defines the actions under a given event. This behavior of the agent is defined in the method setup using the method addBehaviour. The different behaviors that the agent will adopt are defined from the abstract class Behaviour. The class Behaviour contains the abstract methods:

- action (): Is executed when the action takes place.
- done (): Is executed at the end of the performance.

A user can override the methods onStart () and OnEnd () property. Additionally, there are other methods such as block () and restart () used for modifying the agent's behavior. When an agent is locked it can be unlocked in different ways. Otherwise the user can override the methods onStart() and onEnd() the agent possess.

=== Unlock an agent ===
1. Receiving a message.
2. When the timeout happens associated with block ().
3. Calling restart.

== ACL messages ==
Message passing ACL (Agent Communication Language) is the base of communication between agents. Sending messages is done by the method send of the class Agent. In this method, you have to pass an object of type ACLMessage that contains the recipient information, language, coding and content of the message. These messages are sent asynchronously, while messages are received they will be stored in a message queue. There are two types of receiving ACL messages, blocking or non-blocking. For this provide methods blockingReceive () and receive () respectively. In both methods, you can make filtering messages to be retrieved from the queue by setting different templates.

== Extensions ==
JADE has an extension denominated WADE (Workflows and Agents Development Environment) which is a system of workflow which allows create process by a graphic editor named WOLF.

== See also ==
- Multi-agent system
- Autonomous agent
- Intelligent agent
- Cognitive architecture
- Agent Communications Language
