= ICPRAM =

The International Conference on Pattern Recognition Applications and Methods (ICPRAM) is held annually since 2012. From the beginning it is held in conjunction with two other conferences: ICAART - International Conference on Agents and Artificial Intelligence and ICORES - International Conference on Operations Research and Enterprise Systems.

ICPRAM is composed by two main topics areas: theory and methods and applications. Each one of these areas is constituted by several sub-topics like Evolutionary Computation, Density Estimation, Spectral method, Combinatorial Optimization, Reinforcement learning, Meta learning, Convex optimization in the case of Theory and methods and Natural language processing, robotics, Signal processing, Information retrieval, perception in the applications area.

The conference papers are made available at the SCITEPRESS digital library and are published in the conference proceedings. It's also made a selection of the best papers presented in the conference for publication in a Springer volume.

Besides the presentation of papers from the authors, the conference is composed by tutorials. For example, the conference had a tutorial on Secure our society - Computer Vision Techniques for Video Surveillance given by Huiyu Zhou from the Queen's University Belfast, UK.

Since the first edition, ICPRAM has counted on several keynote speakers like Tomaso Poggio, Josef Kittler, Hanan Samet, Nello Cristianini, John Shawe-Taylor and Antonio Torralba.

== Editions ==
- ICPRAM 2020 - Valletta, Malta
- ICPRAM 2019 - Prague, Czech Republic
- ICPRAM 2018 - Funchal, Madeira, Portugal
- ICPRAM 2017 - Porto, Portugal
- ICPRAM 2016 - Rome, Italy
- ICPRAM 2015 - Lisbon, Portugal
- ICPRAM 2014 - ESEO, Angers, Loire Valley, France
- ICPRAM 2013 - Barcelona, Spain
- ICPRAM 2012 - Vilamoura, Algarve, Portugal

== Best Paper Awards ==
=== 2019 ===
Area: Applications

Best Paper Award: Yehezkel S. Resheff, Itay Lieder and Tom Hope. "All Together Now! The Benefits of Adaptively Fusing Pre-trained Deep Representations"

Area: Applications

Best Student Paper Award: Manex Serras, María Inés Torres and Arantza del Pozo. "Goal-conditioned User Modeling for Dialogue Systems using Stochastic Bi-Automata"

=== 2018 ===
Area: Theory and Methods

Best Paper Award: Huanqian Yan, Yonggang Lu and Heng Ma. "Density-based Clustering using Automatic Density Peak Detection"

Area: Applications

Best Student Paper Award: Marcin Kopaczka, Marco Saggiomo, Moritz Guttler, Thomas Gries and Doreit Merhof. "Fully Automatic Faulty Weft Thread Detection using a Camera System and Feature-based Pattern Recognition"

=== 2017 ===
Area: Theory and Methods

Best Paper Award: Seiya Satoh and Ryohei Nakano. "How New Information Criteria WAIC and WBIC Worked for MLP Model Selection"

Best Student Award: Xiaoyi Chen and Régis Lengellé. "Domain Adaptation Transfer Learning by SVM Subject to a Maximum-Mean-Discrepancy-like Constraint"

Area: Applications

Best Paper Award:Sarah Ahmed and Tayyaba Azim. "Compression Techniques for Deep Fisher Vectors"

Best Student Award:Niels Ole Salscheider, Eike Rehder and Martin Lauer. "Analysis of Regionlets for Pedestrian Detection"

=== 2016 ===
Area: Theory and Methods

Best Paper Award: Anne C. van Rossum, Hai Xiang Lin, Johan Dubbeldam and H. Jaap van den Herik. "Nonparametric Bayesian Line Detection - Towards Proper Priors for Robotic Computer Vision "

Best Student Award: Roghayeh Soleymani, Eric Granger and Giorgio Fumera. "Classifier Ensembles with Trajectory Under-Sampling for Face Re-Identification "

Area: Applications

Best Paper Award: Jeonghwan Park, Kang Li and Huiyu Zhou. "k-fold Subsampling based Sequential Backward Feature Elimination "

Best Student Award: Julia Richter, Christian Wiede, Enes Dayangac, Markus Heß and Gangolf Hirtz. "Activity Recognition based on High-Level Reasoning - An Experimental Study Evaluating Proximity to Objects and Pose Information "

=== 2015 ===
Area: Theory and Methods

Best Paper Award: Mohamed-Rafik Bouguelia, Yolande Belaïd and Abdel Belaïd. "Stream-based Active Learning in the Presence of Label Noise"

Best Student Paper: João Costa and Jaime S. Cardoso. "oAdaBoost"

Area: Applications

Best Paper Award: Wei Quan, Bogdan Matuszewski and Lik-Kwan Shark. "3-D Shape Matching for Face Analysis and Recognition"

Best Student Paper: Julia Richter, Christian Wiede and Gangolf Hirtz. "Mobility Assessment of Demented People Using Pose Estimation and Movement Detection"

=== 2014 ===
Area: Theory and Methods

Best Paper Award: Jameson Reed, Mohammad Naeem and Pascal Matsakis. "A First Algorithm to Calculate Force Histograms in the Case of 3D Vector Objects"

Best Student Paper: Johannes Herwig, Timm Linder and Josef Pauli. "Removing Motion Blur using Natural Image Statistics"

Area: Applications

Best Paper Award: Sebastian Kurtek, Chafik Samir and Lemlih Ouchchane. "Statistical Shape Model for Simulation of Realistic Endometrial Tissue"

Best Student Paper: Florian Baumann, Jie Lao, Arne Ehlers and Bodo Rosenhahn. "Motion Binary Patterns for Action Recognition"

=== 2013 ===
Area: Theory and Methods

Best Paper Award: Barbara Hammer, Andrej Gisbrecht and Alexander Schulz. "Applications of Discriminative Dimensionality Reduction"

Best Student Paper: Cristina Garcia-Cardona, Arjuna Flenner and Allon G. Percus. "Multiclass Diffuse Interface Models for Semi-supervised Learning on Graphs"

Area: Applications

Best Paper Award: Yoshito Otake, Carneal Catherine, Blake Lucas, Gaurav Thawait, John Carrino, Brian Corner, Marina Carboni, Barry DeCristofano, Michale Maffeo, Andrew Merkle and Mehran Armand. "Prediction of Organ Geometry from Demographic and Anthropometric Data based on Supervised Learning Approach using Statistical Shape Atlas"

Best Student Paper: James Lotspeich and Mathias Kolsch. "Tracking Subpixel Targets with Critically Sampled Optics"

=== 2012 ===
Area: Theory and Methods

Best Paper Award: Martin Emms and Hector-Hugo Franco-Penya. "ON ORDER EQUIVALENCES BETWEEN DISTANCE AND SIMILARITY MEASURES ON SEQUENCES AND TREES"

Best Student Paper: Anna C. Carli, Mario A. T. Figueiredo, Manuele Bicego and Vittorio Murino. "GENERATIVE EMBEDDINGS BASED ON RICIAN MIXTURES"

Area: Applications

Best Paper Award: Laura Antanas, Martijn van Otterlo, José Oramas, Tinne Tuytelaars and Luc De Raedt. "A RELATIONAL DISTANCE-BASED FRAMEWORK FOR HIERARCHICAL IMAGE UNDERSTANDING"

Best Student Paper: Laura Brandolini and Marco Piastra. "COMPUTING THE REEB GRAPH FOR TRIANGLE MESHES WITH ACTIVE CONTOURS"
