= Interior design psychology =

Branch of environmental psychology

Interior design psychology is a field within environmental psychology, which concerns the environmental conditions of the interior. It is a direct study of the relationship between an environment and how that environment affects the behavior of its inhabitants, intending to maximize the positive effects of this relationship. Through interior design psychology, the performance and efficiency of the space and the well-being of the individual are improved. Figures like Walter Benjamin, Sigmund Freud, John B. Calhoun and Jean Baudrillard have shown that by incorporating this psychology into design one can control an environment and to an extent, the relationship and behavior of its inhabitants. An example of this is seen through the rat experiments conducted by Calhoun in which he noted the aggression, killing and changed sexual tendencies amongst rats. This experiment created a stark behavioral analogy between the rat's behavior and inhabitation in high-rise building projects in the US after WWII, an example of which is the Pruitt-Igoe development in St Louis demolished in 1972 only 21 years after being erected.

== Proxemics ==
Proxemics study the amount of space people feel necessary to have between themselves and others.

=== Crowding and personal space ===
In this field of study, the phenomenon of territoriality is demonstrated continuously through unwritten indices and behaviors, which communicate, the conscious or subconscious notions of personal space and territoriality. This phenomenon is seen, for example, through the use of public seating and the empty seats on a crowded bus or train. "Crowding occurs when the regulation of social interaction is unsuccessful and our desires for social interaction are exceeded by the actual amount of social interaction experienced." Studies observing social behaviors and psychology have indicated, such as in the case of commuters that people will seek to maximize personal space whether standing or sitting.

In a study conducted by Gary W. Evans and Richard E. Wene, (who work within the field of environmental design and human development) of 139 adult commuters, commuting between New Jersey and Manhattan, (54% male) saliva samples were taken to measure cortisol levels, a hormonal marker of stress. Their research accounts statistically for other possible stressors such as income and general life stress. "We find that a more proximal index of density is correlated with multiple indices of stress wherein a more distal index of density is not." Concerns arising from the results of this study suggest that small deviations in increased seat density, controlled against income stress, would elevate the log of cortisol (i.e. stress levels) and diminish task performance and mood.

=== Smooth and Striated space ===
According to Learning Spaces: Creating Opportunities for Knowledge Creation in Academic Life by Savin-Baden, it explored the concept of space in the physical sense when describing smooth and striated cultural spaces. Smooth spaces are described as "nomadic"; that is, in a constant state of movement. For example, the lobby of a hotel, an activity room where the seating directions are towards each other instead of focusing in one line, which provides a sense of relaxation and informality. These spaces are open, flexible, and owned by their inhabitants. Smooth spaces are where knowledge is contested and learning is co-created. They are messy and undisciplined, which often creates tension between stakeholders and users. Striated spaces, on the other hand, are described as bounded spaces, which refers to a certain orientation that focuses primarily in one direction, reflecting the organizational and pedagogical structure of the space. Classrooms and lecture halls are examples of striated spaces.

=== Relationships between people ===
Closely related to the proxemics of space is the area of privacy. In "Perspectives on Privacy" P. Brierley Newell from the department of psychology at the University of Warwick, Coventry defines privacy as "a voluntary and temporary condition of separation from the public domain." The desire for privacy is often identified as a link between stress and distress. The ability to obtain privacy within an environment allows the individual to separate themselves physically and mentally from others and relax. This notion is of key importance in determining the behavior and well-being of the individual. As above in the scenario of crowding and density on public transport, privacy dictates the perception of comfort, in relation to crowding and personal space. Dissatisfaction with one's environment can be related to close proximity with others, leading to stress and as a result, diminish mood and performance behaviors.

=== Defensible space ===
This theory began development in 1962 when John B. Calhoun conducted a series of experiments on rats to study population density and social pathology. From these experiments, a breeding utopia was established for the rats in which they only lacked space. "Unwanted social contact occurred with increasing frequency, leading to increased stress and aggression. Following the work of the physiologist, Hans Selye, it seemed that the adrenal system offered the standard binary solution: fight or flight. But in the sealed enclosure, the flight was impossible. Violence quickly spiraled out of control. Cannibalism and infanticide followed. Males became hypersexual, pansexual and, an increasing proportion, homosexual. Calhoun called this vortex "a behavioral sink". Their numbers fell into terminal decline and the population tailed off to extinction"

This study linked population growth, environmental degradation and urban violence. Similar behavioral tendencies became apparent within the poor housing conditions at the Pruitt-Igoe development in St Louis. This development is now used as a key study of inhabitation by architects and urban planners, Oscar Newman one of the main developers of this field, references the observations of inhabitation at this establishment in his book Creating Defensible Space. He notes the stark difference between private space, which is clearly defined as personal territory, and the public space in this development. He notes that public spaces shared by relatively few families compared to those shared by many were much more hygienic and well-looked after, whereas those shared by larger numbers were often vandalized and unhygienic. He comments that the anonymity created by these largely shared public corridors and spaces "evoked no feelings of identity or control" This indicates our relationship with space affects our behavior and use of space. In this example lack of feelings of ownership of the space led to negative behavior within space and created feedback with negative effects on the well-being of the inhabitants.

== The perception of space ==
This perception can otherwise be termed as awareness between our bodies and the awareness of other bodies, organisms and bodies around us. Perceived beauty and personal involvement within an environment are key factors, which determine our perception of space. As defined in the Measurement of Meaning by Osgood, Suci and Tannebaum the factors influencing the perception of space are these 3 things: 1. Evaluation- including the aesthetic, affective and symbolic meaning of space 2. Power- the energy requirements to adapt to a space 3. Activity- links to the noise within a space and the worker's relationship and satisfaction with job and task. In "Effects of the self-schema on perception of space at work" by Gustave Nicolas Fischer, Cyril Tarquinio, Jacqueline C. Vischer, the study conducted linking design and psychology in the workplace. In this study, they proposed a theoretical model linking environmental perception, work satisfaction and sense of self in a feedback loop. This is shown below in Fig. 1, to illustrate their findings on the direct relationship the environment has with the inhabitant and how through psychology this affects behavior.

(Awaiting copyright approval)

There is also something to be said about the way our increasingly popular open office designs may contribute to less productivity and higher distractions, versus traditional cubicle-like workspaces. According to an article from Fortune, "Evidence is mixed on whether open plans actually foster collaboration, and studies have shown that open office plans decrease productivity and employee well-being while increasing the number of sick days workers take. [...] A study by the architecture and design firm Gensler found that workers in 2013 spent 54 percent of their time on work requiring individual focus, up from 48 percent in 2008." In order to combat this, future offices in our next generations will include sound-proof private rooms allowing workers to work solo without distraction, cubicle banks and private offices while continuing to sustain the open floor plan.

== The System of Objects ==
Developed by Jean Baudrillard as part of his sociology doctorate thesis Le Système des objets (The System of Objects). In this he proposed the 4 object valuing criteria, these being:

1. Function – a pen is used to write
2. Exchange or economic value – a piano being worth three chairs
3. Symbolic – an amethyst symbolizing a birth in February
4. Sign – the branding or prestige of an object, with no added function being valued over another, it may be used to suggest social values such as class.

In this way, the objects and human relationships with objects in the interior environment have significant psychological meaning and impact. In "Social Attributions Based on Domestic Interiors" by M.A. Wilson and N.E. Mackenzie, it is proposed that: "people's interactions with the environment are determined by the meanings they attribute to it, and both stress the impact of expectations on behavior within a particular environment." The study they discuss further developed the theme, that objects and how we classify them, in turn, allows us to classify the social attributes of the owner of the objects, in relation to age and social class according to the object valuing system. This system suggests that our relationship with objects affects both our behavior as we use objects according to their function, but also how we are perceived in the eyes of others. This makes our relationship with objects and space pivotal to our psychology.

== Space-time relationships ==
Charles Rice references the thinking of Walter Benjamin, in The Emergence of the Interior, on the study of interiorization and experience. He proposes that in our faster-paced modern society experiences are instantaneous and through this, we are missing long experiences such as a connection with tradition and the accumulation of wisdom over time. To reforge a sense of this relationship and address the current lack he demonstrates that we might materially create such a relationship through inanimate objects in our environment. Giving the example: "that the hearth and the mantelpiece might materially encode the mythical fireside and the situation it provided for the telling of stories." In this way, one's relationship with objects can embody a sense of experience and fulfill the desire for a connection with tradition.

== Space and user experience ==
In the article "Storied Spaces: Cultural Accounts of Mobility, Technology, and Environmental Knowing" by Johanna Brewer and Paul Dourish, it mentioned the three themes that are directly related to user-experience in terms of campus planning: legibility, literacy, and legitimacy. Legibility refers to "our understanding of how the place and/or space provide information for us, both socially and culturally". Spatial Literacy refers to "how we interpret the information provided by the environment around us, the activities we engage in, and the relevance of those activities." Legitimacy refers to "how we seek information and find relevance within the environment around us." In the concept of campus design, legibility refers to the campus maps, signposts, as well as the lecture room numbers within the building. Literacy refers to the students' feelings and behaviors within a certain environment in the building and what an interior promotes students to do and don't, in general user-experience. And legitimacy refers to the method that students use to engage themselves into this environment, as well as the reason that they come in and leave.

== Space and human behavioural cognition ==
The interaction between humans and spaces tends to reach a certain balance by their interaction. When individuals are in a certain interior environment, they not only express their physical behavior, but also their emotions, thoughts, and willingness are impacted by the interior as well. According to what Ye Wenben mentioned in his article "Interior Design Psychology", the ultimate goal of interior design is to lead human behavioral cognition in a positive way and reach a relatively harmonious dynamic balance through its impact towards humans in terms of user experience and mental conditions.

=== Security ===
Ye mentioned that within a certain space, it does not necessarily mean that the broader the space is, the better it is going to be for the users. The over-broad space tends to cause people a sense of loss and insecurity. The needs of safety and protection of people will make them willing to find certain objects to rely on. For example, in the environment of a train station and subway station, people do not tend to stay in the closest place to board, instead multiple groups are formed and spread themselves around the waiting space, seats, and pillars, and maintain a certain space with other individuals. This concept of "security" has also prompted people to apply the use of interspersed space in order to provide a more stable and secure mentality within a space.

==== Self-congestion ====
According to the journal: Does Space Matter? Assessing the Undergraduate "Lived Experience" to Enhance Learning, by using time-lapse cameras and three years of observing and measuring the interactions and activities of people within these public spaces, it summarized the notion of "self-congestion": people tend to attract other people in public spaces even though they indicate that they prefer to get away from crowds. When it applies to interior design, we must also take in consideration gathered spaces instead of an evenly distributed distance with tables and chairs.

=== Privacy and interpersonal distance ===
Privacy is people's basic need for the space, ensuring self-integrity, expressing one's perspective towards life, is the fundamental proven of freedom and respect towards an individual. Private space is the independent interior space that is restricted by the external materials and stabilized by one's mental awareness. It involves the relative requirements of visions and sounds within the space. Due to the different social scenario and interaction needs, the application for privacy and personal distances also have a clear discipline.

== Brief background ==
A greater awareness into this field has emerged since the 20th century when the function and performance of the interior became of chief importance in designing habitations, the start of user-centered design, for example, La Maison de Verre. This modern idea of the interior-designing for the user from the inside to the outside has coincided with psychological analysis on the effects on inhabitations.

In The Emergence of the Interior, Charles Rice rationalized the implications of the interior:

- Under the context of modernity
- Status of the experience
- Presence of history and
- Knowledge about subjectivity

The Importance of the development of this field is evident through the above areas of study

Understanding and implementation of interior design psychology can impact and improve the performance, efficiency and well-being of the individual inhabitant. As illustrated through the above categories this is an important and relevant developing field within design and planning.

== Color in Interior Design Psychology ==
Color wields immense power in the psychology of interior design, influencing emotions, perceptions, and behaviors. The strategic use of color can transform spaces, evoke specific moods, and even enhance productivity. For instance, blues and greens often create calming environments, while reds and yellows can energize and stimulate creativity. Understanding the psychological impact of color allows designers to craft spaces that not only look beautiful but also support the well-being and purpose of the occupants. For more insights on the significance of color in design, visit Color Works Design and explore resources from the International Association of Color Consultants/Designers North America (IACC-NA).

== See also ==
- Jean Baudrillard
- John B. Calhoun
- Environmental psychology
- Healthy building
- Walter Benjamin
- Place attachment
- Design principles, fundamental concepts from the visual arts used to help viewers understand a given scene
