= Place attachment =

Environmental psychology concept

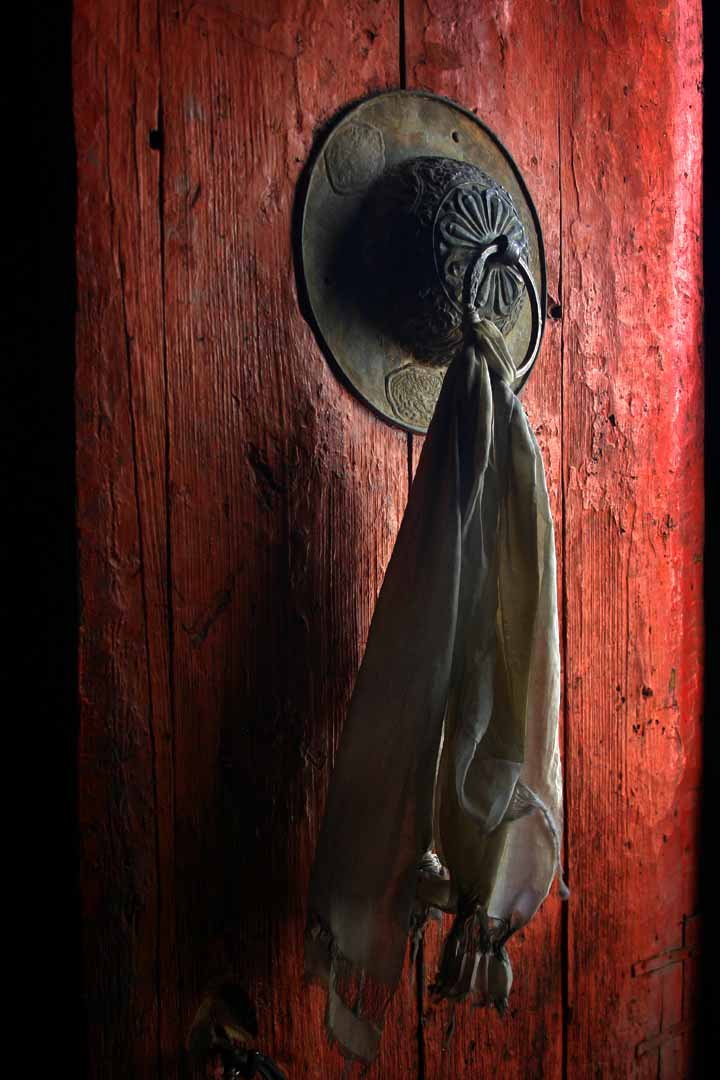
In Himalayan Buddhist culture, the white silk or satin scarf is a sign of blessing. Many times such scarves are attached to places of particular interest or significance.

Place attachment is the emotional bond between person and place, and one way of describing the relationship between people and spatial settings. It is highly influenced by an individual and their personal experiences. There is a considerable amount of research dedicated to defining what makes a place "meaningful" enough for place attachment to occur. Schroeder (1991) notably discussed the difference between "meaning" and "preference," defining meaning as "the thoughts, feelings, memories and interpretations evoked by a landscape" and preference as "the degree of liking for one landscape compared to another."

Place attachment is one aspect of a more complex and multidimensional "sense of place" and cannot be explained simply through a cause and effect relationship. Instead, it depends on a reciprocal relationship between behavior and experiences. Due to numerous varying opinions on the definition and components of place attachment, organizational models have been scarce until recent years. A noteworthy conceptual framework is the Tripartite Model, developed by Scannell and Gifford (2010), which defines the variables of place attachment as the three P's: Person, Process, and Place.

When describing place attachment, scholars differentiate between a "rootedness" and a "sense of place". Sense of place attachment arises as the result of cultivation of meaning and artifacts associated with created places. Due to constant migration over the past few centuries, many Americans are thought to lack this type of place attachment, as they have not stayed in a place long enough to develop storied roots. Rootedness, on the other hand, is an unconscious attachment to a place due to familiarity achieved through continuous residence––perhaps that of a familial lineage that has known this place in the years before the current resident.

Little is known about the neurological changes that make place attachment possible because of the exaggerated focus on social aspects by environmental psychologists, the difficulties in measuring place attachment over time, and the heavy influence of individualistic experiences and emotions on the degree of attachment.

More recently, place attachment is being seen within the grieving and solastalgia linked with climate change induced emotional experiences. Research suggests that engaging with these emotions allows for their inherent adaptiveness to be explored. When emotional experiences linked to place attachment are explored and processed collectively, this leads to a sense of solidarity, connection, and community engagement.

== Tripartite model ==
=== Person ===
The Person dimension addresses the question of, "who is attached?"

When examined individually, places often gain meaning because of personal experiences, life milestones, and occurrences of personal growth. With communities, however, places derive religious, historical, or other cultural meanings. Community behaviors contribute not only to place attachment experienced by citizens of that community as a group, but also to those citizens individually. For example, desires to preserve ecological or architectural characteristics of a place have a direct impact on the strength of place attachment felt by individuals, notably through self-pride and self-esteem. People experience stronger attachments to places that they can identify with or otherwise feel proud to be a part of.

=== Process ===
The process dimension answers the question "How does the attachment exist?" Similar to other concepts in social psychology, this dimension relies on the collective effects of affective, cognitive, and behavioral aspects. Recent research has also explored the symbolic connotations that are thought to be a part of the process.

==== Affect ====
Drawing from attachment theory, affective bonds are thought to arise out of relationships that provide for functional needs, like security and wellbeing. The most common emotions associated with people-place bonding are positive, such as happiness and love. Yi-Fu Tuan, a noteworthy human geographer and pioneer in place attachment research, coined the term topophilia to describe the love that people feel for particular places. Negative emotions and experiences are also capable of giving places significance; however, negative emotions are usually not associated with people-place bonding since place attachment represents individuals' yearnings to replicate positive experiences and emotions.

==== Cognition ====
Cognition incorporates the knowledge, memories, and meanings that individuals or groups have associated with places of attachment. Specifically, these cognitive elements represent what makes specific places important enough for people-place bonding to develop. Environmental psychologists additionally use the term schema to describe how people organize their beliefs and knowledge in regards to places and has led some researchers to note familiarity as a central cognitive element in place attachment. This idea of familiarity has been used in explaining why people mark themselves as "city people" or why they develop preferences for certain types of homes. Researchers have coined a number of terms based on familiarity, including "settlement identity" and "generic place dependence."

==== Behavior ====
Behavior is the physical manifestation of place attachment and can represent the cognitive and affective elements that an individual possesses in their person-place bonds. Proximity-maintaining behaviors have been noted as common behaviors among people who have attachment of place, similar to those who have interpersonal attachments. Many individuals unknowingly experience the effects of place attachment through homesickness and will carry out proximity-maintaining behaviors to satisfy their desires to relieve it by returning home or reinventing their current environments to match the characteristics of home. This reinvention of current environments has been coined as reconstruction of place and is a notable place attachment behavior. Reconstruction of place often occurs when communities are rebuilding after natural disasters or war. As counterintuitive as it may seem, trips and even pilgrimages away from places can enhance a person-place bond because individuals grow an increased appreciation for the places they have left behind, contributing to feelings of nostalgia that often accompany attachment and the memories that places evoke.

=== Place ===
The Place dimension addresses the question of, "what is attached?" and can be applied to any geographic type. Many researchers stress that place attachment relies on both physical and social aspects. Attachment to a place bears no regard to the size of it and can occur in places small (i.e. a room or house) and large (i.e. communities and cities). In fact, the size of the same geographic area can vary between individuals.

Scholars have studied place attachment in a multitude of settings. A common finding throughout many of these studies is that place attachment is thought to increase with greater time spent at it. Further, scholars speculate that place attachment is developed through lived experiences in a place, rather than the symbolic value that is often assigned to places of public value that one may have never visited. Childhood memories are thought to be particularly poignant and an aspect of early place attachment, with attachments formed to places that offered both privacy and the opportunity to engage in fantasy, for example, bedrooms and outdoor landscapes.

Smith (2017) has identified the following typology of places that takes into account both their physical and social attributes.

- Secure places: places that people have some of the strongest identified bonds with. These are places with stability and continuity. The home is most often associated as a secure place.
- Socializing places: these are places with a strong identified community. They may serve as a gathering space; for example, plazas.
- Transformative places: these are places associated with autobiographical recall that are attached to memories as places of importance.
- Restorative places: places that induce physiological reactions. These are often peaceful and natural areas with aesthetic beauty. Outdoor areas like national parks often fall into this category.
- Validating places: these are places with cultural significance and shared meaning.
- Vanishing places: these are places that are transforming from the place that humans commonly associate them with. This may be due to natural or man-made destruction; depletion of natural resources or features; encroachment, where incoming cultures are transforming the meaning of places; and restriction, where particular activities are limited.

==== Social ====
There is debate among environmental psychologists that place attachment occurs due to the social relationships that exist within the realm of an individual's significant place rather than the physical characteristics of the place itself. Some scholars have proposed that sense of place is socially constructed, and that social ties are predictors of place attachment. Hidalgo and Hernández (2001) studied levels of attachment based on different dimensions and found that while social aspects were stronger than physical ones, both affected the overall person-place bond.

==== Physical ====
Natural and built environments can both be subjects of person-place bonds. The resources that these environments provide are the most tangible aspects that can induce attachment. These resources can lead to the development of place dependence. Place dependence negatively correlates with environmental press, which can be defined as the demands and stresses that an environment puts on people physically, interpersonally, or socially. Conversely, intangible aspects of environments can also promote attachment. In particular, the characteristics and symbolic representations that an individual associates with his or her perceptions of self are pivotal in the person-place bond.

== Places of attachment ==
=== Attachment to the home ===
The home has long been studied as a place of attachment, with scholars recognizing the affective bonds people develop to their residence. Early work by Fried (1966) examined West End Bostonians' reactions of grief in response to relocation from their residences. Fried postulated that this pointed to the spatial and social significance of the home and sense of continuity it creates for individuals' everyday routines and relationships. The home is a symbol of domestic life. It is thought to represent security and emotional attachment, which Smith has equated with a "womb-like" place. The home is also particularly relevant in childhood memories, where children spend most of their time during their formative years.

Possession and control of the home have been found to heighten sense of place attachment. Scholars have found that sense of attachment increases with home ownership, as opposed to renting. Further, territoriality, the ability to exercise control over the space, is thought to be a central feature of the attachment to the home in that it embodies privacy. Of this, forms of attachment to the home are thought to include "home experience", "rootedness" and "identity".

=== Attachment to neighborhoods ===
Neighborhoods are community areas without officially constructed borders, the boundaries for which are primarily construed by individual residents based on amenities and points of interest within walking distance. Factors that are thought to influence neighborhood attachment include assimilation into the social community (length of residence, interest in neighborhood occurrences, and relationships with others), engagement with local institutions and organizations, and the makeup of the neighborhood itself (size, density, and socioeconomic class). Studies looking at neighborhood diversity have found that people in homogenous neighborhoods are more likely to report place attachment; likewise, there is a negative correlation between increased neighborhood diversity and place attachment.

=== Attachment to landscapes ===
Place attachment can occur on landscapes of varying significance. For ordinary landscapes, that attachment is often one of biological utility (i.e. ones that offer food and shelter), cultural significance, or experience within an individual's lifetime (particularly childhood).

The evidence for a relationship between place attachment and place stewardship has been mixed. Scholars have noted relationships between attachment and environmental stewardship; for example, increased likelihood of recycling and limiting water use, support for recreational areas, and engagement with community organizations. However, multiple others have failed to find relationships. Willingness to intervene on behalf of the environment may be dependent upon whether the attachment is primarily due to the physical or social attributes of the environment. Scannell and Gifford found that people with greater attachment to the physical location were more likely to engage with it.

== Developmental theories ==
There is very little research dedicated to the underlying developmental and neurological processes for place attachment, which is a major criticism of the field. Suggested developmental theories include the mere-exposure effect and the security-exploration cycle. Environmental psychologists have recognized parallels between the attachment theory and the development of place attachment, but the attachment theory at times fails to recognize place as a playing piece and instead classifies it as a background for attachment relationships.

The security-exploration cycle indicates that a place can become the target of attachment when it incorporates both security and exploration. For example, the home, a popular object of attachment, typically possesses a safe or familiar indoor environment and an outdoor space that satisfies desires to explore and expand knowledge. This example is capitalized upon by Morgan (2010), who proposed a combination of human attachment and place attachment in a model called the Exploration-Assertion Motivational System, which suggests that the strongest attachments originate during childhood. The model states that place attachment forms due to a cycle of repeated arousals and behaviors that are linked to both places and attachment figures. As a result of this balance between exploration and attachment behavior, children receive positive reinforcements in the forms of connectedness and a sense of adventure and mastery.

Despite the absence of a well-established developmental theory and understanding of the neurological changes that accompany place attachment, most researchers agree that some form of place attachment occurs for each person at some point in his or her lifetime, with childhood homes being the most prevalent object of attachment.

== Scientific research ==
=== Predictors of attachment ===
There is a desire among researchers to create a list of concrete variables that account for differing extents of place attachment among individuals. It is believed that increased length of residence in a location increases the attachment a person has to that location. Place attachment tends to develop fast in early years of life and in a short time of residence, it helps that a person visits constantly the same place and no others, making, place attachment and place identity settle and grow. Over extended periods of time, place identity can develop. Place identity is defined as an individual's perception of self as a member of a particular environment. Other proposed positively correlated variables are ownership (i.e. of home, land) and social interactions. Some inversely related variables that have been suggested are building size and age.

=== Place Identity ===
This construct is usually mistaken with place attachment, even if they develop from different causes. Place attachment develops from positive experiences and the satisfactory relationship between a person and a place, while place identity comes from beliefs, meanings, emotions, ideas and attitudes assigned to a place.

Place identity often develops more gradually compared to place attachment, particularly for migrants who may initially experience only place dependence in their new environment. For many immigrants and refugees, functional dependence on a place—such as relying on it for basic needs like housing and employment—precedes the emotional connection associated with place identity. Research on migrant populations has shown that while many individuals may develop place dependence relatively quickly, only a smaller number establish a deeper sense of identity with the new place. This process is influenced by several factors, including the presence of familiar cultural or environmental elements that can help migrants feel more connected to their new surroundings. For bicultural migrants, the coexistence of cultural markers from both their country of origin and their new environment can accelerate the development of place identity by fostering a sense of continuity and belonging.

=== Place dependence or functional attachment ===
Defined as a functional relationship based on the conditions provided for a place in order to satisfy the needs of a person or accomplish a specific goal. Also depends on how is evaluated in other places, answering the question, "What can I do in this place that I can't do in other places?". Functional attachment depends on certain characteristics related to the place, as how much this area is compatible with a person, as they can carry out their activities and goals, this type of attachment is common in those who practice green exercise. This kind of attachment grows exponentially in relation to the number of visits.

=== Benefits ===
The benefits related to place attachment include the ability to build memories as the person is capable to connect with his ancestors past, the feeling of belonging to a place, the personal growth as it provides the opportunity to experience positive emotions as a result from a healthy relationship with the place, so the person can feel security and freedom.

=== Measuring attachment ===
Psychometric and Likert scales are the most commonly used quantitative methods for different dimensions of place attachment, such as belongingness and identity. Meanings of places are often quantitatively studied by asking participants to score a set list of places on the basis of 12 categories: aesthetic, heritage, family connection, recreation, therapeutic, biological diversity, wilderness, home, intrinsic, spiritual, economic, life-sustaining, learning, and future. Another example of quantitative measurements are frequency counts with word associations. Qualitative research has been conducted with the intention to gain insight into meanings that places possess. Some of the techniques used for qualitative research are free association tasks, in-depth interviews, and verbal reports from focus groups.

=== Memory association ===
Memories combine sensations and perceptions to create images that can be used to retain and recall information or past experiences. Over time, memories collectively allow an individual to develop feelings of familiarity that comprise a sense of place. When an interactive experience with three-dimensional space does not match these developed expectations, an individual adapts his or her understanding of place through learning and sensory input. For this reason, places are frequently associated with memories that can evoke physical senses.

The plasticity of memories means that place identities are subject to change. Memories of places and individual preferences for specific places both change over time. Adults tend to focus on the emotions, meanings, and contextual implications of feelings in association with places. Children, however, focus on physical aspects of environments and what can be performed in various environments, which can be seen in the popularity of "pretend" and imagination games among children. Consequently, childhood memories of places are typically oriented around heavily emotional, intense, or euphoric events.

== Applications ==
=== Disaster psychology ===
A healthy emotional relationship between a city or neighborhood and its inhabitants maintains the culture and positive attitudes despite any detrimental events that may be occurring in that city or neighborhood (i.e. people having an increased sense of security even if they live in a war zone). When forced relocation occurs, refugees experience a grieving process similar to when loved ones are lost. Through reconstruction of place, the familiarity of an attachment to places lost can be mimicked to relieve stress and grief.

=== Space planning ===
An understanding of the psychological factors responsible for place attachment is important for the effective development of place loyalty that allows cities and towns to flourish. Additionally, successful places address the needs or maintain the cultural integrities and meanings that communities have placed upon them. More specifically, additions of buildings or monuments and creation of outdoor recreational spaces must be well-aligned with a community's place attachment to prevent backlash from inhabitants that do not agree with the intended land developments.

=== Senior communities ===
Environmental press is often considered with elderly populations transitioning into assisted living or senior communities. Improving the overall community psychology and sense of community can allow place attachment to develop for both individuals and groups. Developing new place attachment is usually more difficult with increased age, and as a result, recently transitioned senior adults and senior communities are popular subjects for research in order to test the efficacy of various community-building techniques, such as celebrations and neighborhood political organizations.

In addition to environmental press, place attachment in senior communities is heavily influenced by subjective dimensions of well-being, such as autonomy, control, and a sense of identity. Studies show that place attachment can mitigate the negative impacts of low economic status on well-being by providing emotional support, self-esteem, and mutual respect. For instance, social interactions within the community, including neighborhood activities and leisure in green spaces, have been found to increase place attachment, particularly for low-income seniors. Furthermore, a strong sense of place attachment can help reduce the detrimental effects of environmental stressors and improve overall mental health and quality of life among elderly individuals.

== See also ==
- Attachment theory
- Behavioral psychology
- Community psychology
- Environmental psychology
- Human geography
- Interior design psychology
- Sense of place
- Place identity
