= PlatBox Project =

Multi-agent computer simulations

PlatBox Project, formally known as Boxed Economy Project, is a multi-agent based computer simulation software development project founded by Iba Laboratory at Keio University, Japan. The main work of PlatBox Project is to develop PlatBox Simulator and Component Builder, which are claimed to be the first multi-agent computer simulation software that do not require end-users to have any computer programming skill in order to create and execute multi-agent computer simulation models. Currently, the project is organized by Takashi Iba, assistant professor from Keio University, and Nozomu Aoyama. PlatBox Simulator and Component Builder are currently offered only in Japanese; however, the English version is expected to be out anytime soon.

== PlatBox Simulator ==
PlatBox Simulator is a multi-agent based simulation platform developed by PlatBox Project.

== ComponentBuilder ==
ComponentBuilder is a multi-agent based simulation modeling tool developed by PlatBox Project.

== See also ==
- Agent-based model
- Repast (modeling toolkit)

== Articles ==
- Resolving the Existing Problems by Boxed Economy Simulation Platform. T. Iba, Y. Chubachi, Y. Matsuzawa, K. Asaka, K. Kaiho, Agent-based Approaches in Economic and Social Complex Systems, A. Namatame, et al. (eds.), IOS Press, 2002, pp. 59–68.
- Boxed Economy Foundation Model: Toward Simulation Platform for Agent-Based Economic Simulations. T. Iba, Y. Takabe, Y. Chubachi, J. Tanaka, K. Kamihashi, R. Tsuya, S. Kitano, M. Hirokane, Y. Matsuzawa, New Frontiers in Artificial Intelligence, Takao Terano, Toyoaki Nishida, Akira Namatame, Syusaku Tsumoto, Yukio Ohsawa, Takashi Washio (Eds.), Springer-Verlag, 2001, pp. 227–236
- Iterated Prisoners' Dilemma on Alliance Networks. T. Furukawazono, Y. Takada, T. Iba, International Workshop and Conference on Network Science 2007, New York, May, 2007
- Understanding Social Complex Systems with PlatBox Simulator. T. Iba, The 5th International Conference on Computational Intelligence in Economics and Finance (CIEF2006), Taiwan, Oct., 2006 (pp. 64–67)
- Building a Simulation Model of the Currency Basket Peg System. M. Kunitomo, T. Iba, H. Takayasu, The 5th International Conference on Computational Intelligence in Economics and Finance (CIEF2006), Taiwan, Oct., 2006 (pp. 129–132)
- Building a Simulation Model of Foreign Exchange Market: Reproduction of Yen Dollar Market. A. Usami, R. Tsuya, T. Iba, H. Takayasu, The 5th International Conference on Computational Intelligence in Economics and Finance (CIEF2006), Taiwan, Oct., 2006 (pp. 133–136)
- Consumer Network and Market Dynamics. S. Itoh, Y. Murakami, T. Iba, The 5th International Conference on Computational Intelligence in Economics and Finance (CIEF2006), Taiwan, Oct., 2006 (pp. 22–25)
- Analysis of Factors which Contribute to Inter-Enterprise Competition. T. Shimizu, Y. Takada, T. Iba, The 5th International Conference on Computational Intelligence in Economics and Finance (CIEF2006), Taiwan, Oct., 2006 (pp. 68–71)
- A Collaborative Tool for Modeling and Simulating Social Complex Systems. T. Iba, N. Aoyama, Y. Takada, Y. Murakami, The First International Conference on Knowledge, Information and Creativity Support Systems (KICSS2006), Thailand, Aug., 2006 (pp. 239–244)
- Social Interaction Models: Toward A Platform for Infection Transmission Science. Takashi Iba, International Symposium on Trends in Transmission Models for Infectious Diseases 2005 - Modeling Biology Focusing on Social Risk Assessment-, Tokyo, Japan, 2005
- Development Tools of Simulation Models with MDA. Nozomu Aoyama, Rintaro Takeda, Takashi Iba, Hajime Ohiwa, International Workshop on Massively Multi-Agent Systems, Kyoto, Japan, Dec. 2004
- A Framework and Tools for Modeling and Simulating Societies as Evolutionary Complex Systems. Takashi Iba, 2nd International Conference of the European Social Simulation Association, Spain, Sep, 2004
- Analysis on the Factor of Price Volatility in Deregulated Electric Power Market. Ryunosuke Tsuya, Naoto Sato, Takashi Iba, Yyoshiyasu Takefuji, 2nd International Conference of the European Social Simulation Association, Spain, Sep, 2004
- From Conceptual Models to Simulation Models: Model Driven Development of Agent-Based Simulations. Takashi Iba, Yoshiaki Matsuzawa, Nozomu Aoyama, 9th Workshop on Economics and Heterogeneous Interacting Agents, Kyoto, Japan, May 2004.
- Boxed Economy Foundation Model. T. Iba, Y. Chubachi, Y. Takabe, K. Kaiho, and Y. Takefuji, The AAAI-02 Workshop on Multi-Agent Modeling and Simulation of Economic Systems, pp. 78–83, Canada, July 2002.
- Boxed Economy Simulation Platform for Agent-Based Economic and Social Modeling. T. Iba, Y. Takefuji, Computational Analysis of Social and Organizational Systems 2002, Pittsburgh, USA, June 2002.
- Boxed Economy Simulation Platform and Foundation Model. T. Iba, Y. Takabe, Y. Chubachi, Y. Takefuji, Workshop of Emergent Complexity of Artificial Markets, 4th International Conference on Computational Intelligence and Multimedia Applications, pp. 34–38, Kanagawa, October 2001.
- Boxed Economy Foundation Model: Toward Simulation Platform for Agent-Based Economic Simulations. T. Iba, Y. Takabe, Y. Chubachi, J. Tanaka, K. Kamihashi, R. Tsuya, S. Kitano, M. Hirokane, Y. Matsuzawa, JSAI 2001 International Workshop on Agent-based Approaches in Economic and Social Complex Systems, Matsue, May 2001, pp. 186–193
- Exploratory Model Building: Toward Agent-Based Economics. T. Iba, M. Hirokane, H. Kawakami, H. Takenaka, Y. Takefuji, International Session, The 4th Annual Meeting of the Japan Association for Evolutionary Economics, Tokyo, March 2000.
- Boxed Economy Model : Fundamental Concepts and Perspectives. T. Iba, M. Hirokane, Y. Takabe, H. Takenaka, Y. Takefuji, First International Workshop on Computational Intelligence in Economics and Finance, Atlantic City, U.S., March 2000.
