= Sense of place =

Term used in behavioral sciences and urban planning

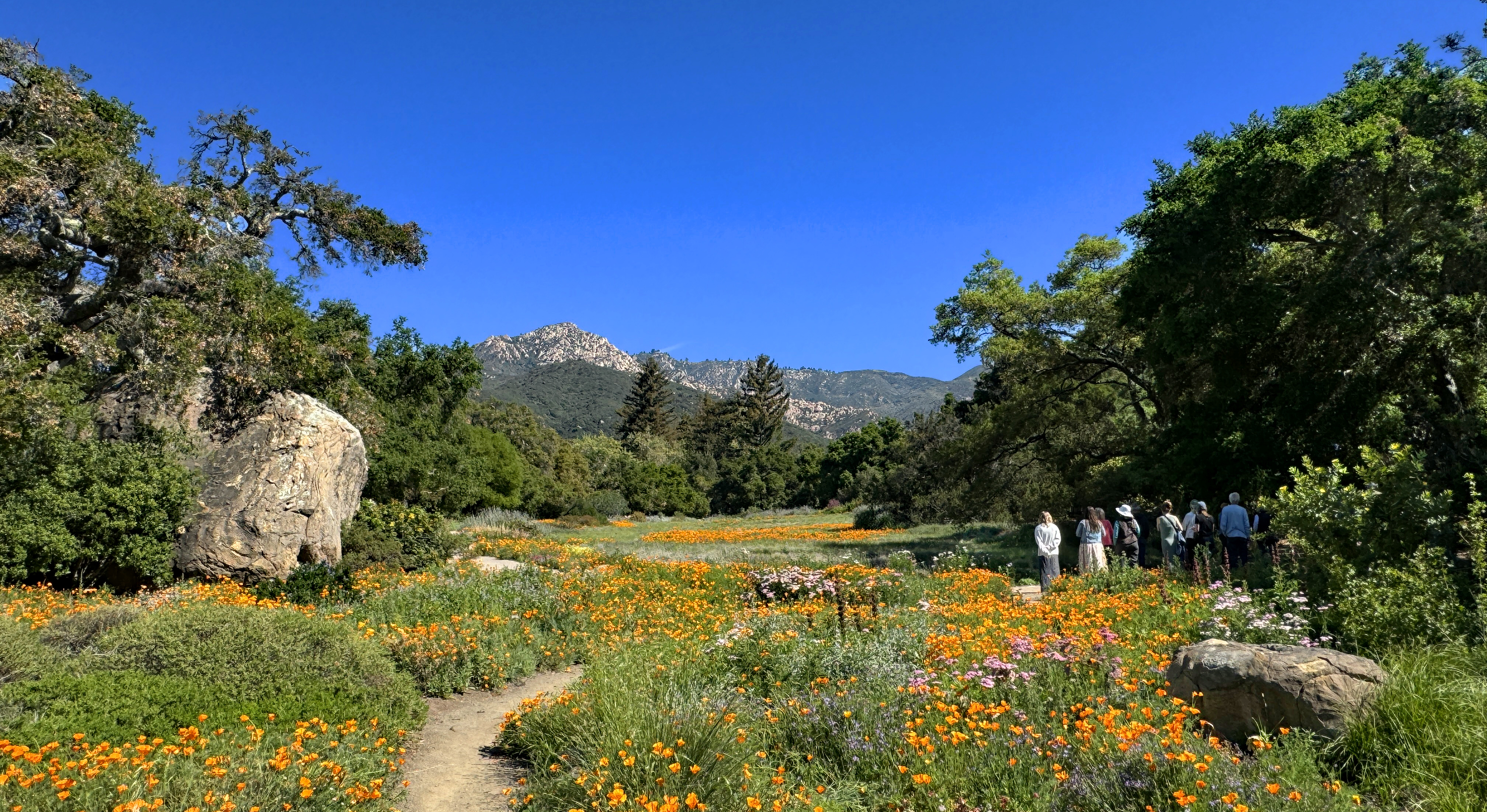
Visitors admiring the California native plants in the Santa Barbara Botanic Garden

The term sense of place refers to a multidimensional, complex construct used to characterize the relationship between people and spatial settings. It is a characteristic that some geographic places have and some do not, while to others it is a feeling or perception held by people (not by the place itself). It is often used in relation to those characteristics that make a place special or unique, as well as to those that foster a sense of authentic human attachment and belonging. Others, such as geographer Yi-Fu Tuan, have pointed to senses of place that are not "positive", such as fear.

Some students and educators engage in "place-based education" in order to improve their "sense(s) of place", as well as to use various aspects of place as educational tools in general. The term is used in urban and rural studies in relation to place-making and place-attachment of communities to their environment or homeland. The term sense of place is used to describe how someone perceives and experiences a place or environment. Anthropologists Steven Feld and Keith Basso define sense of place as: "the experiential and expressive ways places are known, imagined, yearned for, held, remembered, voiced, lived, contested and struggled over [...]". Many indigenous cultures are losing their sense of place because of climate change and "ancestral homeland, land rights and retention of sacred places".

== Geographic place ==
Cultural geographers, anthropologists, sociologists and urban planners study why certain places hold special meaning to particular people or animals. Places said to have a strong "sense of place" have a strong identity that is deeply felt by inhabitants and visitors. Sense of place is a social phenomenon. Codes aimed at protecting, preserving and enhancing places felt to be of value include "World Heritage Site" designations, the British "Area of Outstanding Natural Beauty" controls and the American "National Historic Landmark" designation.

== Placelessness ==
Places that lack a "sense of place" are sometimes referred to as "placeless" or "inauthentic". Edward Relph, a cultural geographer, investigates the "placelessness" of these locations. Anthropologist Marc Augé calls these locations "non-places". In Internet culture, non-places are sometimes called liminal spaces.

Stepping against the kind of reductive thinking that placelessness can lead to, in his book, The Practice of Everyday Life, Jesuit philosopher Michel de Certeau uses the term "space" (French: espace) to refer to these placeless locations as opposed to "place" (lieu). For de Certeau, "space is merely composed of intersections of mobile elements" that are not in stasis. Place, on the other hand, is space that has been ordered in some way to serve some human need. A park, for instance, is a place that has been constructed "in accord with which elements are distributed in relationships of coexistence" and therefore "implies an indication of stability". de Certeau's ideas became instrumental in understanding the intersections of power and social relations in the construction of place. For de Certeau, placelessness, or "space" was a site for freedom or at least it is the site for what Timotheus Vermeulen sees as "potentially anarchic movement"

Placeless landscapes are seen as those that have no special relationship to the places in which they are located—they could be anywhere; roadside strip shopping malls, gas/petrol stations and convenience stores, fast food chains, and chain department stores have been cited as examples of placeless landscape elements. Some historic sites or districts that have been heavily commercialized for tourism and new housing estates are defined as having lost their sense of place. Gertrude Stein's "there is no there there" has been used as a description of such places.

== Development of sense of place ==
Human geographers, social psychologists and sociologists have studied how a sense of place develops. Their approaches include comparisons between places, learning from elders and observing natural disasters and other events. Environmental psychologists have emphasized the importance of childhood experiences and have quantified links between exposure to natural environments in childhood and environmental preferences later in life. Learning about surrounding environments during childhood is strongly influenced by the direct experience of playing, as well as through the role of family, culture, and community. The special bond which develops between children and their childhood environments has been called a "primal landscape" by human geographers. This childhood landscape forms part of an individual's identity and constitutes a key point of comparison for considering subsequent places later in life. As people move around as adults, they tend to consider new places in relation to this baseline landscape experienced during childhood. In an unfamiliar environment, a sense of place develops over time and through routine practices, a process that can be undermined by disruptions in routines or abrupt changes in the environment.

In the context of climate change, sense of place and then the awareness of the changes and disaster related destruction of place is leading to emotional experiences of grief and solastalgia. Research states that these emotional experiences that arise are inherently adaptive and recommends collective processing and reflecting on these in order to increase resilience and a sense of belonging. In post-disaster situations, some programs aim to re-establish a sense of place through a participatory approach.

== Music and place ==
Ethnomusicologists, among other social scientists (like anthropologists, sociologists, and urban geographers), have begun to point toward music's role in defining people's "sense of place". British ethnomusicologist Martin Stokes suggests that humans can construct an idea of "place" through music that signals their position in the world in terms of social boundaries and moral and political hierarchies. Stokes argues that music does not simply serve as a reflection of existing social structures, but yields the potential to actively transform a given space. Music denoting place can "preform" a knowledge of social boundaries and hierarchies that people use to negotiate and understand the identities of themselves and others and their relation to place.

Examples of music's role in defining a sense of place include ethnomusicologist George Lipsitz's research on the performance of Mexican-American cultural identity in Los Angeles. In response to mechanical reproduction and increasingly commodified forms of culture, Walter Benjamin once argued that cultural objects have become increasingly removed from their original context and place of creation. In this context, ethnomusicologist George Lipsitz suggests that a consciousness of invisibility and alienation marks the cultural identity of minority groups excluded from political power and cultural recognition. Lipsitz analyzes the postmodern, cultural strategies (like bifocality, juxtaposition of multiple realities, intertextuality, inter-referentiality, and families of resemblance), Chicano rock-and-roll musicians during the late-1980s in Los Angeles used to define a sense of place within popular culture. By attending to the cultural work of Mexican-American rock-and-roll musicians, Lipsitz identifies how their music actively demonstrates a "conscious cultural politics that seeks inclusion in the American mainstream by transforming it."

== See also ==
- Affordance
- Genius loci
- Spirit of place
- Cultural landscape
- Activity space
- Place identity
- Place attachment
- Topophilia
- Ian Nairn
- Jane Jacobs
