= Pablo Adasme =

Argentine footballer (born 1993)

Personal information
- Full name: Pablo Sebastián Adasme
- Date of birth: 25 October 1993 (age 33)
- Place of birth: San Rafael, Argentina
- Height: 1.82 m (5 ft 11 1/2 in)
- Position: Goalkeeper

Team information
- Current team: Rincón del Atuel

Youth career
- Rincón del Atuel
- 2007–2014: Independiente Rivadavia

Senior career*
Years	Team	Apps	(Gls)
2014–2018	Independiente Rivadavia	0	(0)
2014	→ Huracán (loan)	4	(0)
2015	→ Racing de Olavarría (loan)	7	(0)
2016–2017	→ Estudiantes (loan)	9	(0)
2018–	Rincón del Atuel		
- * Club domestic league appearances and goals

Pablo Sebastián Adasme (born 25 October 1993) is an Argentine footballer who plays as a goalkeeper for Rincón del Atuel.

== Career ==
Adasme was formed in the academy of Rincón del Atuel, leaving the club at the age of fourteen to join Independiente Rivadavia. He was loaned out in 2014 to Huracán, therefore rejecting a move to Atlético Pilares, making four appearances for Huracán. A loan with fellow Torneo Federal B side Racing de Olavarría followed, where he featured seven times as they suffered relegation. He returned to his parent club in January 2016, but immediately agreed a two-season loan with Estudiantes of Primera B Nacional. He made his professional debut on 12 November against All Boys, which was one of nine games.

Having been an unused substitute twenty-three times without playing for Independiente Rivadavia during the 2017–18 campaign, Adasme departed permanently on 15 August 2018 to rejoin Rincón del Atuel.

== Career statistics ==
As of 27 January 2019.

Club statistics
Club	Season	League			Cup		Continental		Other		Total	
Club	Season	Division	Apps	Goals	Apps	Goals	Apps	Goals	Apps	Goals	Apps	Goals
Independiente Rivadavia	2014	Primera B Nacional	0	0	0	0	—		0	0	0	0
Independiente Rivadavia	2015	Primera B Nacional	0	0	0	0	—		0	0	0	0
Independiente Rivadavia	2016	Primera B Nacional	0	0	0	0	—		0	0	0	0
Independiente Rivadavia	2016–17	Primera B Nacional	0	0	0	0	—		0	0	0	0
Independiente Rivadavia	2017–18	Primera B Nacional	0	0	0	0	—		0	0	0	0
Independiente Rivadavia	Total		0	0	0	0	—		0	0	0	0
Huracán (loan)	2014	Torneo Federal B	4	0	0	0	—		0	0	4	0
Racing de Olavarría (loan)	2015	Torneo Federal B	7	0	0	0	—		0	0	7	0
Estudiantes (loan)	2016	Primera B Nacional	0	0	0	0	—		0	0	0	0
Estudiantes (loan)	2016–17	Primera B Nacional	9	0	0	0	—		0	0	9	0
Estudiantes (loan)	Total		9	0	0	0	—		0	0	9	0
Career total			20	0	0	0	—		0	0	20	0
