= Paoli Research Center =

Research and development facility of Burroughs and Unisys

- Established: 1954 (72 years ago)
- Dissolved: 1992
- Types: research center
- Country: United States
- Part of: Burroughs Corporation, Unisys

The Paoli Research Center was a research and development facility established in 1954 by the Burroughs Corporation, then known as the Burroughs Adding Machine Company. It was created a university campus like setting in the Philadelphia suburb of Paoli, Pennsylvania for the Burroughs Research Laboratory, then located at 511 North Broad Street in Philadelphia. The initial focus was for the development of business accounting systems and experimental work in electromechanics. The Paoli Research Center grew over the years and was the source of many research contribution to computing, including work on computing hardware design, programming languages, algorithms and defense applications.

The research center continued after Burroughs and Sperry Corporation merged to become Unisys and performed both research for the Unisys corporation as well as for government sponsors. Research topics included artificial intelligence, computational linguistics, database systems, software engineering and bioinformatics. In the early 1990s the research staff was relocated to Unisys' nearby Great Valley facility and the Paoli building was sold in 1992, demolished and replaced with condominiums and an assisted living center.

== History ==
=== Establishment ===
In the early 1950s, the Burroughs Corporation (then the Burroughs Adding Machine Company) sought to expand its electronics research capabilities beyond its existing laboratory at 511 North Broad Street in Philadelphia. Under the direction of Irven Travis, a former professor at the University of Pennsylvania's Moore School of Electrical Engineering, the company looked for a location that could offer a "university campus-like setting" to attract top scientific talent.

In 1951, Burroughs purchased a 12-acre plot of the John H. Dingee estate (known as "Fennerton") in Paoli, a suburb on the Philadelphia Main Line. The site was chosen for its proximity to the Pennsylvania Railroad and the residential communities of Chester County.

=== Construction and Architecture ===
The facility was designed by the architectural firm Walker-Yeomans Associates with Aaron Colish and Frank E. Hahn serving as associate architects. Construction was carried out by the Baton Construction Company and completed in 1954 at a cost of approximately $5 million.

The modern, L-shaped building featured two long, two-story laboratory wings and a central section emblazoned with a large "B" logo, which is visible from U.S. Route 202. The facility included an administrative quadrangle, a cafeteria, an auditorium, and a library. It opened with a staff of nearly 400 employees, including physicists, mathematicians, and engineers.

=== Closure ===
Following the 1986 merger of Burroughs and Sperry to form Unisys, corporate restructuring led to the consolidation of facilities. In the early 1990s, the research staff was relocated to the nearby Unisys facility in the Great Valley Corporate Center in Malvern, Pennsylvania. The Paoli Research Center was closed and the property was sold in 1992. The building was subsequently demolished and replaced by a residential development consisting of condominiums and an assisted living center.
