= Deliberative planning =

Planning style focused on dialogue

Deliberative planning refers to a planning process that focuses on making decisions through dialogue, making seasoned arguments and in depth deliberations to take the correct course of action. Deliberative Planning focuses on actions, and the effect that they have on the course of a project.

This planning method is a form of participatory planning, an urban planning theory that focuses on involving the community in the planning and management process. Participatory planning works to include all points of view in the decision making process, and gather them all into one vision. Being deliberative involves being motivated by an intended outcome and choosing a vision that is based on sound evidence and reason.

Deliberation can take many forms in understanding planning, whether it be more formal and technical, or more organic and exploratory. According to Diane Hopkins, deliberative planning has three main parts: "the motives behind involving citizens in decision-making (Philosophy); the design and dynamics of the decision-making (Process); and the intended and actual outcomes of deliberative planning (Outcome)." These three steps are ultimately intended to involve the majority of the community, and the largest stakeholders for the proposed development.

Deliberative planning does not have to be solely based in the planning field, but also has applications in computational programming and AI. In computational programming, the idea of being deliberative focuses on understanding planning, intent, and motivation to achieve the desired result.

== See also ==
- Deliberative democracy – Form of democracy focusing on deliberation and informed decision-making
