= Foundation for Intelligent Physical Agents =

FIPA
- Founded: 1996
- Purpose: Intelligent agents
- Website: ArchiveSite

The Foundation for Intelligent Physical Agents (FIPA) is a body for developing and setting computer software standards for heterogeneous and interacting agents and agent-based systems.

FIPA was founded as a Swiss not-for-profit organization in 1996 with the ambitious goal of defining a full set of standards for both implementing systems within which agents could execute (agent platforms) and specifying how agents themselves should communicate and interoperate in a standard way.

Within its lifetime the organization's membership included several academic institutions and a large number of companies including Hewlett-Packard, IBM, BT (formerly British Telecom), Sun Microsystems, Fujitsu and many more. A number of standards were proposed, however, despite several agent platforms adopting the "FIPA standard" for agent communication it never succeeded in gaining the commercial support which was originally envisaged. The Swiss organization was dissolved in 2005 and an IEEE standards committee was set up in its place.

The most widely adopted of the FIPA standards are the Agent Management and Agent Communication Language (FIPA-ACL) specifications.

The name FIPA is somewhat of a misnomer as the "physical agents" with which the body is concerned exist solely in software (and hence have no physical aspect).

== Systems using FIPA standards ==
- Gamma Platform. See FIPA interface
- Fetch.AI
- Jade
- Jadex Agents (Java)
- Java Intelligent Agent Componentware (JIAC) (Java)
- The SPADE Multiagent and Organizations Platform (Python)
- JACK Intelligent Agents (Java)
- The April Agent Platform (AAP) and Language (April) (No longer actively developed)
- Zeus Agent Building Toolkit (No longer actively developed)
- The Fipa-OS agent platform (No longer actively developed)
- AgentService (C#) (last update: 2009)

== See also ==
- Agent Communications Language
