= Freshwater Wetlands Protection Act =

The Freshwater Wetlands Protection Act was passed by the New Jersey Legislature on July 1, 1987, to "preserve the purity and integrity of freshwater wetlands from random, unnecessary or undesirable alteration or disturbance." This statute extended state and federal protection of waterways. Prior to this act, only coastal and navigable waters were protected. The act extended protection to inland waterways and freshwater wetlands, which serve to protect water quality, provide flood protection, and provide habitat for wildlife.

Passage of the act followed quickly on the heels of a moratorium on development in New Jersey's wetlands declared by Governor Thomas Kean. This was the second time in New Jersey history that a governor declared a moratorium on development activity threatening New Jersey's environment. Kean declared the moratorium after four years of asking for legislation protecting wetlands. The first such moratorium was declared by Governor Brendan Byrne in the late 1970s, prohibiting development in the Pinelands prior to passage of the Pinelands Protection Act of June 28, 1979. Both moratoria were challenged in court, but the challenges became moot when the laws were passed.

In late 2018, a coalition of environmental groups demanded that Governor Phil Murphy declare a moratorium on fossil fuel infrastructure, citing the incompatibility of future increases in New Jersey greenhouse gas emissions with the Global Warming Response Act of 2007.

== Background ==
Wetlands were originally viewed as wastelands, and more than 11 million acres of American wetlands were drained for various uses from 1953 to 1983. Ten times that had been lost since the first European settlers arrived. But in the late 1960s and early 1970s, researchers found that marshes and swamps "were worth billions annually in wildlife production, groundwater recharge, and for flood, pollution, and erosion control." This motivated the passage of the 1972 federal Water Pollution Control Act.

In spite of being one of the smallest states, New Jersey was one of the top 5 states in the 1980s in estuarine (coastal wetland) losses. Development due to urbanization in northern New Jersey also threatened wetlands. Its dense population (in 1973, almost 10% of the US population lived within 50 miles of New Brunswick) created a high demand for housing development and many municipalities zoned wetlands for housing or industry. In the 1980s, New Jersey was losing over 3,000 acres a year of wetlands to development. Wetlands were being drained for agriculture; channelized for flood control; filled for housing, highway, industry, and landfills; dredged for navigation channels, harbors, and marinas; and more.

Governor Kean had long been interested in the protection of wetlands. Early in his first term (1983), he tried to implement a strong environmental regulation package, but opposition (primarily from builders) objected to any increase the bureaucracy of the EPA's process. In the Spring of 1987, the Environmental Protection Agency asked the Conservation Foundation (later to become the World Wildlife Fund) to convene a national forum on wetlands issues. The resulting National Wetlands Policy Forum was chaired by Governor Kean.

The deadlock on action to protect wetlands was broken in 1987. On June 9, 1987, Governor Kean declared an 18-month moratorium on development in any of New Jersey's remaining 300,000 acres of freshwater wetlands, saying that he would lift the moratorium as soon as the New Jersey legislature sent him a bill protecting the wetlands that he could sign. The order directed Commissioner Richard Dewling of the Department of Environmental Protection to deny all permits for development in wetlands. It affected 500-600 projects.

Due to uncertainty about the definition of wetlands, almost all development in New Jersey halted when the moratorium was imposed. This was worse for developers than the proposed bill, so on July 1, 1987, the New Jersey legislature finally passed the Freshwater Wetlands Protection Act.

== Provisions of the Act ==
The Freshwater Wetlands Protection Act provided protection for inland as well as coastal wetlands, by authorizing a comprehensive permitting program to regulate all activities in freshwater wetlands and "transition areas," i.e., buffers adjacent to wetlands. Prior to the passage of the Act, wetlands were protected by both Federal law (the Clean Water Act) and by state law (the Coastal Area Facility Review Act of 1973 (CAFRA), the Wetlands Act of 1970, and the Waterfront Development Law of 1914). The Federal program was administered by the Army Corps of Engineers, which focusses on navigable waters, leaving inland waters vulnerable. The state laws prior to this Act protected only coastal areas.

Among the goals of the Act were to reduce duplication with the Federal program and to consolidate the state programs so that regulation takes place in a consistent manner. The Act required the New Jersey Department of Environmental Protection to take over the administration of the Section 404 program of the Clean Water Act, which regulates filling and dredging of "the waters of the United States." The EPA approved the state's assumption of this authority in 1994, after considerable negotiation.

== See also ==
- Environmental law in New Jersey
- Air Pollution Control Law in New Jersey
- Water Pollution Control Law in New Jersey
- Pinelands Protection Act
- New Jersey Department of Environmental Protection
