= Thomas H. Morrin =

American engineer

- Born: 24 November 1914; Yolo County, California
- Died: 15 July 1998 (aged 83)
- Scientific career
- Workplaces: United States Navy; Office of Naval Research; SRI International

Thomas Harvey Morrin I (24 November 1914 – 15 July 1998) was an American engineer and the director of engineering at SRI International from 1948 to 1963.

== Personal life and education ==
He was married to Frances Von Ahn and had four children with her: Diane Morrin, Lynne Morrin, Denise Fabiano, and Thomas Morrin II.

== Career ==
Morrin had an extensive naval career during World War II as a naval engineer, and later worked at the Office of Naval Research.

Morrin was recruited to SRI international in 1948, where he was the first member and head of their Engineering Group and recruited many prominent engineers, particularly from the Harvard Radio Research Laboratory; one of these was Jerre Noe, who would go on to lead SRI's Information Sciences and Engineering Division. He played a key role in bringing Electronic Recording Machine, Accounting (ERMA) to SRI, and had significant involvement in the ERMA project itself.

Morrin was later involved in the development of a large contract with the United States Army dedicated to continuous, broad technical support, the Combat Development Experimentation Center (CDEC). In Spring 1958, General Fred Gibb landed his helicopter in SRI's parking lot, met with SRI's president (then E. Finley Carter) and demanded that SRI submit a sole source bid to the existing CDEC in Fort Ord, California; SRI's $1 million bid was accepted and the contract ran for eight years, until September 1966.

He was also instrumental in bringing in work from Southern Pacific, including William K. MacCurdy's Hydra-Cushion and a grade crossing computer. Morrin left SRI in 1963.

== Awards and honors ==
In 1960, Morrin was named an IEEE Fellow. In 1999, he was named to SRI's Hall of Fame.

== Works cited ==
- Nielson, Donald (2006). A Heritage of Innovation: SRI's First Half Century. Menlo Park, California: SRI International. ISBN 978-0-9745208-1-0.
