= Pinelands Protection Act =

The Pinelands Protection Act, passed by the New Jersey Legislature in June 1979, required the development of a Comprehensive Management Plan (CMP) for the New Jersey Pine Barrens, a relatively undeveloped, ecologically unique area. The goal of the CMP was to state the rules on how the land may be used.

In 1978, the US Congress had passed the National Parks and Recreation Act, which made the Pine Barrens the first National Reserve and authorized the creation of a planning entity (established as the Pinelands Planning Commission). In 1979, because of concern that this unique area would be destroyed by overdevelopment, Governor Brendan T. Byrne declared a moratorium on development in the Pine Barrens. This prompted the New Jersey legislature to pass the Pinelands Protection Act to end the moratorium while the Pinelands Commission implemented rules to regulate development in the Pine Barrens.

== Background ==
On November 25, 1967, the New Yorker published the first part of a two-part series about the Pine Barrens by John McPhee. He described viewing a wilderness from a fire tower, extending for hundreds of square miles, as far as the eye could see. The Pine Barrens seemed to McPhee to be the last vestige of wilderness in what he believed would become an unbroken city from Boston to Richmond. New Jersey at the time had nearly 1,000 residents per square mile, and parts of northern New Jersey had 40,000 people per square mile. The Pine Barrens had 15 people per square mile. He concluded his second article with the hope that the land would become a national reserve, but with the fear that the forest was slowly headed for extinction.

In his 1977 campaign for re-election, Governor Byrne argued for strong controls over development. On May 28, 1977, he established the "Pinelands Review Committee" to determine the boundaries of the Pinelands and to develop a plan to preserve it.

Democratic Congressman James Florio introduced a bill requiring the state to create a "land management commission" to oversee "greenline parks," of which the Pinelands would be the first. Republican Congressman Edwin Forsythe of Burlington County and Democratic Congressman William Hughes of Atlantic County introduced a bill to create a federal wildlife refuge in the center of the Pinelands, with the rest of the Pinelands to be managed by commissions in each of 41 municipalities. Forsythe and Hughes considered Florio's plan to give too much power to the Federal government. Florio considered the Forsythe-Hughes plan too uncoordinated.

Republican Senator Clifford P. Case and Democrat Harrison A. Williams Jr. introduced a third bill that was somewhat of a compromise and incorporated ideas from Governor Byrne. It authorized creation of "national reserves" and designated the Pinelands National Reserve as the first such reserve. It gave a state two years to form a commission to develop a plan for conservation of the area. This was the National Parks and Recreation Act, passed on November 19, 1978. On February 8, 1979, Governor Byrne created the Pinelands Planning Commission with Executive Order 71. As required by the Act, the commission would consist of seven gubernatorial appointees, seven local county officials, and one appointed by the Secretary of the Interior.

The executive order also imposed a moratorium on approval of permits for development in the Pinelands. This was an unprecedented use of gubernatorial power and was immediately challenged in court by builders. Even the Governor's advisors and his Attorney General's office doubted that he had the power to issue the order, but it did put pressure on the legislature to approve legislation establishing a permanent Pinelands Commission that could override municipal land-use decisions. On June 21, 1979, at 3:12 am after a 6-hour filibuster, the Pinelands Protection Act was passed.

== Provisions of the Act ==
The Act required the Pinelands Commission to develop a Comprehensive Master Plan controlling land use in the Pine Barrens. It also required that county and municipal master plans and land use ordinances be brought into conformance with the Comprehensive Management Plan.

The Pinelands National Reserve created by the National Parks and Recreation Act is slightly larger than the Pinelands Area defined by the Pinelands Protection Act. The Reserve includes additional land east of the Garden State Parkway and land to the south bordering Delaware Bay. Altogether the Pinelands cover all or parts of 56 municipalities and seven counties: Atlantic, Burlington, Camden, Cape May, Cumberland, Gloucester, and Ocean.

The Pinelands Protection Act distinguishes the Preservation Area, which is the remote interior of the Pines, from the surrounding portions. The Preservation Area comprises about 39% of the total Pinelands Area and contains large tracts of relatively unbroken forest and most of the New Jersey berry industry. Development is highly regulated in the Preservation Area. The larger Protection Area is more complicated to regulate, as it contains a mix of farmland, hamlets, subdivisions, and towns.

The Preservation Area part of the plan was approved by the Pinelands Commission on August 8, 1980. The Protection Area Plan, which also constituted the Comprehensive Management Plan for the national Pinelands Preserve, was adopted by the Commission on November 21, 1980 and approved by Secretary of the Interior Cecil D. Andrus on January 16, 1981.

== See also ==
- Environmental law in New Jersey
- Air Pollution Control Law in New Jersey
- Water Pollution Control Law in New Jersey
- Freshwater Wetlands Protection Act
- New Jersey Department of Environmental Protection
