= Curtis Carlson =

American research scientist (b. 1945)

Curtis R. Carlson
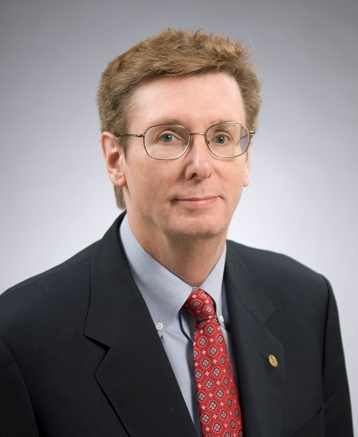
- Born: May 22, 1945 (age 81); Providence, Rhode Island, U.S.
- Education: Worcester Polytechnic Institute; Rutgers University
- Awards: Robert H. Goddard Alumni Award; Otto H. Schade Award
- Scientific career
- Fields: Geophysical fluid dynamics
- Workplaces: SRI International; Sarnoff Corporation; Northeastern University

Curtis Raymond Carlson (born May 22, 1945) was president and CEO of SRI International from 1998 to 2014.

As of 2020, Carlson is a professor of practice at Northeastern University, where he is further developing value creation methodology, called Carlson-Polizzotto Method, along with his colleague Len Polizzotto.

== Education ==
Carlson earned his B.S. in physics from Worcester Polytechnic Institute in 1967 and a Ph.D. in geophysical fluid dynamics from Rutgers University in 1973.

== Career ==
=== Sarnoff Corporation ===
Starting in 1973, Carlson participated in research and development in the field of imaging systems, working with the RCA Sarnoff Laboratory. In 1981, Carlson was named the Director of the Image Quality and Perception Research Group and Vice President of the laboratory in 1990. In 1995, Carlson became Executive Vice President of Sarnoff's Interactive Systems Division. He started the 1997 team that developed the HDTV program that became the US standard. He also started the 2000 team that designed a system to assess broadcast image quality. Both of these teams were awarded a Technology & Engineering Emmy Awards for their accomplishments.

=== SRI International ===
He served as the president of SRI International from 1998 to 2014, and oversaw Sarnoff Corporation's full integration into SRI in January 2011. During that period he was Chairman of the Sarnoff Corporation.

Carlson is known for "Carlson's Law", coined by New York Times columnist Thomas Friedman to describe Carlson's balance between autocracy and democracy in an organization: "In a world where so many people now have access to education and cheap tools of innovation, innovation that happens from the bottom up tends to be chaotic but smart. Innovation that happens from the top down tends to be orderly but dumb."

== Memberships and awards ==
In 2017 Carlson was selected to be a member of the Worcester Polytechnic Institute's "Hall of Luminaries." This award has been given to only eleven previous individuals in the over 150-year history of the university. He is a WPI trustee emeritus.

In December 2012, Carlson was named a Charter Fellow of the National Academy of Inventors. For his contributions to science, technology, and business, He also received the Suffolk University's first Global Leadership in Innovation and Collaboration Award. He is an honorary Kobe Ambassador for SRI's contributions to Kobe, Japan.

In 2010, he was named to the National Advisory Council on Innovation and Entrepreneurship under President Obama. Carlson has served on several government task forces including the Air Force Scientific Advisory Board, the Army Science Board and the Defense Science Board task force on bio-chemical defense. He also serves on the National Academy of Engineering Committee on Manufacturing, Design, and Innovation, and is a council member on the Government-University-Industry Research Roundtable, a joint body of the National Academy of Sciences, National Academy of Engineering, and the Institute of Medicine. He is a member of the Highlands Group, which makes recommendations to government officials regarding technological developments of interest to the government.

In 2002, Carlson was awarded Worcester Polytechnic Institute's Robert H. Goddard Alumni Award for Outstanding Professional Achievement due to his contributions to science, technology, and business. Carlson has been involved in establishing WPI's Silicon Valley Project Center. He has given several commencement speeches, including at WPI on May 20, 2006; at Stevens Institute of Technology on May 22, 2008; at the Malaysian Technical University, at Shantou University in China, at Menlo College in California, and at the University of Richmond on May 8, 2011.

For his role in advancing the functional performance and image quality of information displays, Carlson received the Otto H. Schade Award from the Society for Information Display in June 2006.

Carlson has received honorary degrees from Worcester Polytechnic Institute, Stevens Institute of Technology and Kettering University. Carlson is a member of the Institute of Electrical and Electronics Engineers, Sigma Xi, Tau Beta Pi, and the Society of Motion Picture and Television Engineers.

He is a member of the US National Science Foundation's Directorate for Engineering Advisory Committee. He was a member of the National Academy of Engineering team that made recommendations to the National Science Foundation on the use of global value creation best practices. With Len Polizzotto he has worked with the NSF to help implement the NAE recommendations and has provided NSF a Value-Creation Guidebook on their application.

== Selected publications ==
- Carlson, Curtis (1978). Visibility of displayed information.
- Carlson, Curtis; Wilmot, William (2006). Innovation: The Five Disciplines for Creating What Customers Want. Crown Business. ISBN 0-307-33669-7., named in Bloomberg Businessweek's as a best Best Business Book of 2006.
