= Environmental law in New Jersey =

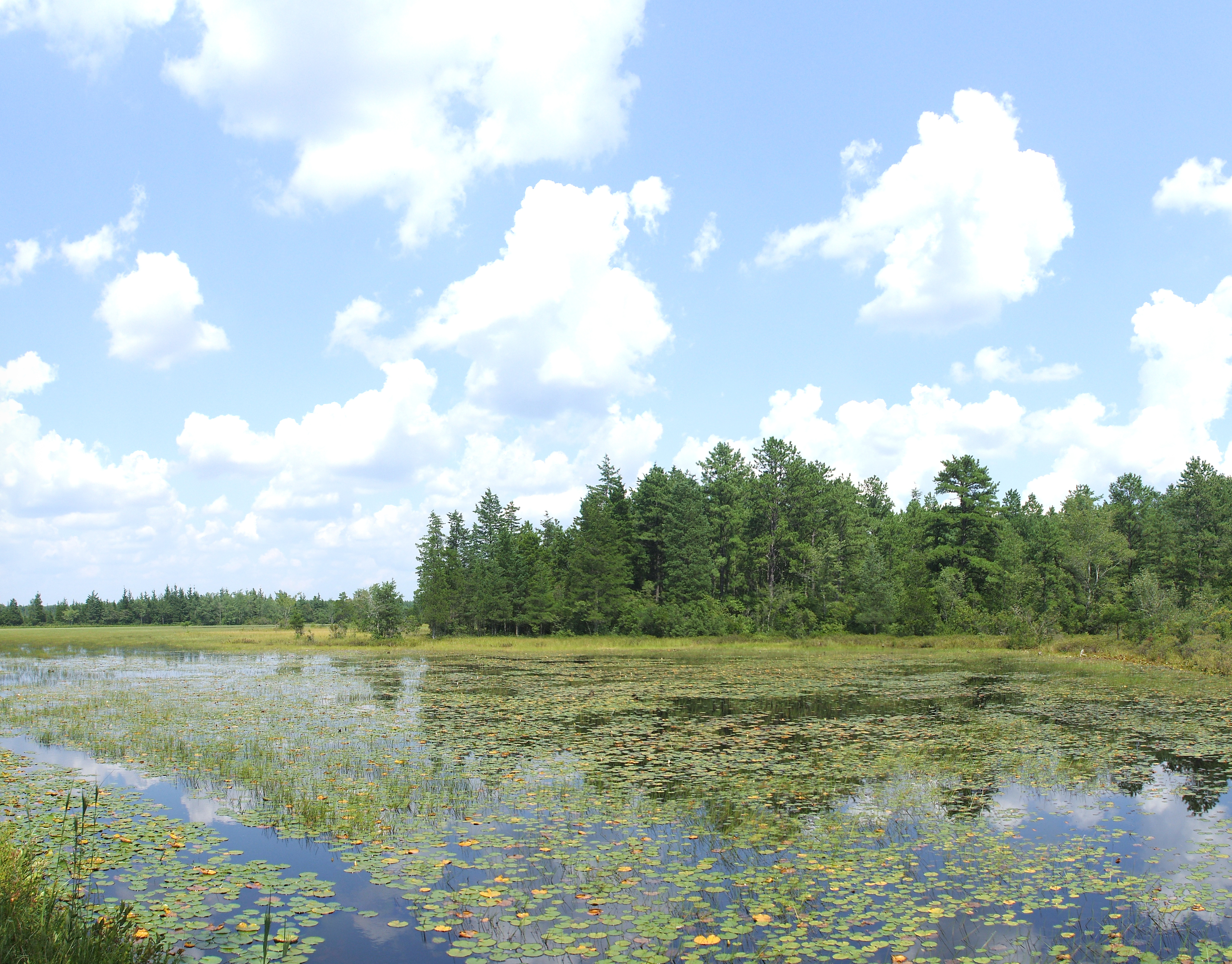
Development in the Pine Barrens in southern New Jersey is regulated by the "Pinelands Protection Act."

Environmental law in New Jersey consists of legislative and regulatory efforts to protect the natural environment in the State of New Jersey. Such efforts include laws and regulations to reduce air and water pollution, regulate the purity of drinking water, remediate contaminated sites, and preserve lands from development, particularly in the Pinelands of southern New Jersey and the Highlands in the north of the state. Environmental laws in New Jersey are enforced primarily by the New Jersey Department of Environmental Protection (NJDEP).

== History ==
As with other states in the United States, New Jersey did not have a coherent state-wide set of environmental laws prior to the mid-20th century. Until then, environmental issues were primarily handled on the local level, in form of ordinances regulating the disposal of waste and sewage and providing for the distribution of drinking water to the city's inhabitants. For example, the 1874 charter for the city of Trenton states:

"it shall not be lawful for any person or body corporate to deposit in any sewer, drain, or stream within this city the contents of any water-closet, privy, or any kind of filth which may become detrimental to the public health of the city."

This law was to be enforced by the city government, and it was sufficiently broad that it could have been used to enforce public health detriments from manufacturing-related water pollution. However, as can be seen from the wording of the law, it was primarily intended to regulate sewage. An example that more closely resembles contemporary environmental regulations is a 1927 ordinance adopted by Union City "prohibiting the emission of dense smoke from and the use of bituminous coal in certain fuel-burning equipment and imposing penalties for violations thereof," which represents an early attempt to control air pollution in the city.

New Jersey was one of the first states to pass legislation addressing air pollution on a broad scale. The "Air Pollution Control Act (1954)," as it was originally enacted, established an air pollution control commission in the Department of Health and directed the commission to create air pollution regulations and gave the department broad but vague authority to enforce the code. The "Air Pollution Control Act" is still the state's major air pollution legislation, although it has been significantly amended and expanded since 1954 (see below). Also in 1950s, the state began to take an interest in statewide water quality and water supply issues, passing the "Realty Improvement Sewerage and Facilities Act (1954)" and the "New Jersey Water Supply Law, 1958."

The 1960s saw major amendments to the "Air Pollution Control Act" as well as the beginnings of a statewide land conservation program with the enactment of the "New Jersey Green Acres Land Acquisition Act of 1961." This act devoted $60 million to land preservation and established the Green Acres program in the state. The 1960s also saw the enactment of the first statewide regulations concerning construction in flood-prone areas: the "Flood Hazard Area Control Act." This law would later become one of the state's major pieces of land-use legislation. However, in its initial form, this law merely authorized the state to delineate an area and being at risk of flood and inform municipalities and the public of this fact.

Finally, in 1970, the NJDEP was established in order to consolidate the enforcement of state environmental laws, which had been delegated to several state agencies. This, coupled with the increased momentum of the environmental movement in the 1970s throughout the United States, led to the enactment of major statewide environmental policies and programs as they exist today.

== Major Legislation by Topic ==
=== Air pollution control ===
The NJDEP enforces the federal Clean Air Act of 1963 through its State Implementation Plan (SIP), a combination of statutes, regulations, rules applying to single facilities in the state, and quasi-regulatory provisions such as plans developed by the NJDEP to address a specific issue. The SIP for New Jersey can be found in the Code of Federal Regulations (CFR) at 40 CFR §52.1570. Some of the major laws in the plan include laws regulating open burning and the composition of motor vehicle fuel, laws requiring motor vehicle emissions testing, and laws requiring facilities that produce a significant amount of a pollutant to apply for a permit from the NJDEP and follow the requirements established for the permit. The Clean Air Act sets National Ambient Air Quality Standards for particulate matter, sulfur dioxide, ozone, nitrogen dioxide, carbon monoxide, and lead, and requires each state to adopt regulations in order to meet the standards. During the 2010s, New Jersey was able to meet the standards for each of the pollutants except ozone.

New Jersey's major air pollution control legislation is the "Air Pollution Control Act (1954)." This act predated the federal Air Pollution Control Act but was significantly amended in 1967 in response to the federal Clean Air Act and its amendments in 1965 and 1967. The provisions of the "Air Pollution Control Act" are incorporated into the SIP to enforce the federal Clean Air Act. "The Air Pollution Control Act" remains significant in its own right, however, because it provides the NJDEP's authority for inspecting facilities and punishing persons who do not comply with air pollution control laws.

=== Water pollution control ===
The NJDEP has been delegated the authority to enforce the federal Clean Water Act. The primary state legislation regarding water pollution is the "Water Pollution Control Act." The Water Pollution Control Act prohibits the discharge of any pollutant into the waters of the state without a valid permit. The NJDEP enforces the "Water Pollution Control Act" through the New Jersey Pollutant Discharge Elimination System, a system of permits for facilities that discharge liquid waste into natural waters in the state. According to the NJDEP's website, "[t]he types of regulated facilities can range from very small users such as campgrounds, schools, and shopping centers to larger industrial and municipal wastewater dischargers."

=== Safe drinking water ===
New Jersey's major drinking water legislation is the "Safe Drinking Water Act." It authorizes the NJDEP to adopt a maximum contaminant level for various contaminants found in drinking water (e.g. lead and copper). These standards largely follow the standards established by the federal Safe Drinking Water Act. However, the NJDEP's state standards are more stringent for certain contaminants. In addition, the NJDEP has adopted a maximum contaminant level for some substances (e.g. perfluorooctanoic acid and perfluorooctanesulfonic acid) that the federal government has not adopted. In addition, the NJDEP has adopted "secondary" drinking water standards for substances that effect the taste, smell, and appearance of drinking water. These standards are not enforceable but only serve as recommendations to drinking water purveyors.

=== Remediation of contaminated sites ===
The major statute concerning the control and cleanup of hazardous substances is the "Spill Compensation and Control Act." The "Spill Compensation and Control Act" has been referred to as the state counterpart to the federal Superfund law, although it predated the Superfund law. The "Spill Compensation and Control Act" authorizes the NJDEP to clean up sites and surrounding natural areas that have been contaminated with hazardous substances, and, more significantly, it authorizes the NJDEP to receive compensation for the remediation costs from "any person who has discharged a hazardous substance, or is in any way responsible" for the discharge. It also holds the persons involved "strictly liable, jointly and severally, without regard to fault, for all cleanup and removal costs," which is a very strong form of liability. For example, in State Department of Environmental Protection v. Ventron Corp, the New Jersey Supreme Court held that the parent corporation of the polluting company, as well as private individuals who had purchased part of the contaminated property, were liable for cleanup costs.

Where the "Spill Compensation and Control Act" is intended to apply to cases in which hazardous substances have been accidentally or deliberately released into the surrounding environment, particularly groundwater, the "Industrial Site Recovery Act" (ISRA) applies to industrial facilities that have been contaminated through the normal operation of the facility. ISRA was enacted in 1993, replacing the unpopular and controversial "Environmental Cleanup Responsibility Act" (ECRA). ISRA has fundamentally the same purpose as ECRA, however, which is to hold the owner of an industrial facility responsible for the cleanup of the site. ISRA thus requires industrial facilities that use hazardous substances or produce hazardous by-products to clean up their sites to the satisfaction of the NJDEP, and as a condition of selling the property or stopping production at the facility. Because ISRA simplified and streamlined the existing regulations under ECRA, the signing statement to the bill included Governor Jim Florio's remark that "this new law may be called the Industrial Site Recovery Act, but I like to think of it as the New Jobs Creation Act."

=== Preservation from development ===
The Green Acres program, first established in 1961, allows the state, municipalities, and non-profit grounds to purchase land to permanently preserve as open space. The state constitution was amended in 1996 and again in 2014 to devote a certain percentage of the state's business tax revenues to the Green Acres program. As of 2019, the NJDEP reported that the program had preserved 650,000 acres of open space. In addition, New Jersey has enacted two major laws to control development in two large regions in the state. For southern New Jersey, the Pinelands Protection Act regulates development in the Pinelands National Reserve, and, for northern New Jersey, the "Highlands Water Protection and Planning Act" regulates development in the Highlands region, a swath of land in the northern half of the state that contains the Appalachian mountains and which is a significant source of drinking water for the state.

The Pinelands National Reserve was created by Congress in 1978 through the enactment of the federal "National Parks and Recreation Act of 1978." In this act, Congress espoused the "ecological, natural, cultural, recreational, educational, agricultural, and public health benefits" of the Pinelands region and declared it to be in the national interest to protect and preserve "these benefits for the residents of and visitors to the area." The state legislature then enacted the "Pinelands Protection Act" in order to implement the goals of the federal law. The "Pinelands Protection Act" establishes a state commission known as the Pinelands Commission which is tasked with drawing up a plan for development in the Pinelands region and approving the development plans of each municipality in the region. The overall goal of the Pinelands Commission is to channel new development into certain areas that are less environmentally sensitive, and to avoid low density development over a large area.

The "Highlands Water Protection and Planning Act" was enacted in 2004. Unlike the Pinelands Act, it is a purely state-level law and does not implement a federal law. The "Highlands Act" establishes the Highlands Water Protection and Planning Council, which is tasked with developing a plan for development in the region. The law also divides the Highlands region into a "preservation area," which is required to conform to the council's development plan, and a "planning area," in which conformance to the council's development plan is voluntary. In the preservation area, most major developments require a special permit from the NJDEP before they can proceed. These permits are generally more strict than they would be for a development outside the Highlands region.

=== State environmental review ===
New Jersey Executive Order 215 (1989)

In 1989, then-Governor Thomas Kean (R) signed Executive Order 215 (E.O. 215), which has served as New Jersey's equivalent to statutory environmental policy acts in other states and the federal NEPA statute. The goal of E.O. 215 is "to reduce or eliminate any potential adverse environmental impacts of projects initiated or funded by the State." Accordingly, all state agencies, departments, and other authorities that propose or fund (> 20%) 'major projects' are required to prepare one of the following types of environmental report:

1. An environmental assessment (EA) is the less comprehensive and less extensive of the two report formats. Unlike an EIS, the EA does not need to contain an analysis of proposed alternatives to the main project. However, the project description and accompanying materials (graphs, site plants, maps, etc.) will be similar in substance. An EA is required for what E.O. 215 calls a Level 1 project, where expected construction costs exceed $1 million. In such cases, a Finding of No Significant Impact (FONSI) pursuant to the federal NEPA statute may be substituted for the New Jersey EA.
2. An environmental impact statement (EIS) is longer and more comprehensive. An EIS must include list and describe alternatives to the proposed project. An EIS is required for a Level 2 project, where expected construction costs exceed $5 million and the footprint of land disturbance exceeds five acres.

Completed EA and EIS reports (or FONSIs) are submitted to the New Jersey Department of Environmental Protection (NJDEP). The Department reviews these reports, issues a finding about their completeness, and (if complete) recommends a course of action. The proposing agency may respond by accepting or disputing NJDEP's recommendations. Ultimately, E.O. 215 will require the commissioners of NJDEP and the proposing agency to reach a "good-faith" resolution of any continuing disagreements.

New Jersey's state environmental review requirements are comparatively less extensive than those in New York and certain other states, where the determination of project type (and the corresponding depth of the review process) is based on a more substantive classification of a project's likely impacts, rather than the simple cost or land-area thresholds employed by New Jersey under E.O. 215. Furthermore, New Jersey's environmental review requirements only apply to projects initiated or substantially funded by state agencies, and not to private projects that merely require a state discretionary action, such as the issuance of a state or local permit. Notably, developers should be aware that some New Jersey municipalities have enacted additional, more stringent environmental review requirements for local projects that exceed the state requirements under E.O. 215.

== See also ==
- Law of New Jersey
- Air Pollution Control Law in New Jersey
- Water Pollution Control Law in New Jersey
- Pinelands Protection Act
- Freshwater Wetlands Protection Act
- New Jersey Department of Environmental Protection
