= IraqComm =

IraqComm Pack (photo by SRI International)

IraqComm is a speech translation system that performs two-way, speech-to-speech machine translation between English and colloquial Iraqi Arabic. SRI International in Menlo Park, California led development of the IraqComm system under the DARPA program Spoken Language Communication and Translation System for Tactical Use (TRANSTAC).

== Vocabulary ==
IraqComm has a vocabulary of tens of thousands of words in English and in Iraqi Arabic. The system is designed to enable soldiers or medics to converse with civilians in settings such as military checkpoints, door-to-door searches, or first aid situations. The system is tailored to translate spoken interactions on topics on force protection, security, and basic medical services, and can be customized to include other topics as needed. Conversations can be logged for later review or archiving.

== Users ==
After IraqComm demonstrated leading performance in competitive laboratory tests under Phase 1 of TRANSTAC, in Spring 2006 the U.S. military selected the IraqComm system for evaluation in real tactical operations in Iraq.

== Design ==
IraqComm integrates three software technologies: automatic speech recognition (ASR), machine translation (MT), and text-to-speech synthesis (TTS). To start a dialog, the user speaks into the microphone and the system records his or her voice. The ASR module processes the recording and displays what it heard on the screen. The MT module translates the phrase into the target language (e.g., Iraqi Arabic). The TTS module then “speaks” this translation, which is also displayed on the screen.

To simplify and speed up communication, the IraqComm interface provides a shortcut menu of frequently used phrases. The user can change the phrase to be translated by editing it with the keyboard or by selecting a similar-sounding phrase with a single press of a button.

SRI's DynaSpeak speech recognition engine is embedded in the IraqComm system. DynaSpeak speech recognition is also used in the Phraselator, a weatherproof handheld language translation device developed by VoxTec, a former division of the military contractor Marine Acoustics, located in Annapolis, MD.
