= Phraselator =

Language translation device

The Phraselator is a weatherproof handheld language translation device developed by Applied Data Systems and VoxTec, a former division of the military contractor Marine Acoustics, located in Annapolis, Maryland, USA. It was designed to serve as a handheld computer device that translates English into one of 40 different languages.

== The device ==
The Phraselator is a small speech translation PDA-sized device designed to aid in interpretation. The device does not produce synthesized speech like that utilized by Stephen Hawking; instead, it plays pre-recorded foreign language MP3 files. Users can select the phrase they wish to convey from an English list on the screen or speak into the device. It then uses speech recognition technology called DynaSpeak, developed by SRI International, to play the proper sound file. The accuracy of the speech recognition software is over 70 percent according to software developer Jack Buchanan. The device can also record replies for translation later.

Pre-recorded phrases are stored on Secure Digital flash memory cards. A 128 MB card can hold up to 12,000 phrases in four or five languages. Users can download phrase modules from the official website, which contained over 300,000 phrases as of March 2005. Users can also construct their own custom phrase modules.

Earlier devices were known to have run on an SA-1110 Strong Arm 206 MHz CPU with 32MB SDRAM and 32MB onboard Flash RAM.

A newer model, the P2, was released in 2004 and developed according to feedback from U.S. soldiers. It translates one way from English to approximately 60 other languages. It has a directional microphone, a larger library of phrases and a longer battery life. The 2004 release was created by and utilizes a computer board manufactured by InHand Electronics, Inc.

In the future, the device will be able to display pictures so users can ask questions such as "Have you seen this person?"

Developer Ace Sarich notes that the device is inferior to human interpreter. Conclusions derived from a Nepal field test conducted by U.S. and Nepal based NGO Himalayan Aid in 2004 seemed to confirm Sarich's comparisons:

The very concept of using a machine as a communication point between individuals seemed to actually encourage a more limited form of interaction between tester and respondent. Usually, when limited language skills are present between parties, the genuine struggle and desire to communicate acts as a display of good will – we openly display our weakness in this regard – and the result is a more relaxed and human encounter. This was not necessarily present with the Phraselator as all parties abandoned learning about each other and instead focused on learning how to work with the device. As a tool for bridging any cultural differences or communicating effectively at any length, the Phraselator would not be recommended. This device, at least in the form tested, would best be used in large-scale operations where there is no time for language training and there is a need to communicate fixed ideas, quickly, over the greatest distance by employing large amounts of unskilled users. Large humanitarian or natural disasters in remote areas of third-world countries might be an effective example.

== Origin ==
The original idea for the device came from Lee Morin, a Navy doctor in Operation Desert Storm. To communicate with patients, he played Arabic audio files from his laptop. He informed Ace Sarich, the vice president of VoxTec, about the idea. VoxTec won a DARPA Small Business Innovation Research grant in early 2001 to develop a military-grade handheld phrase translator.

During its development, the Phraselator was tested and evaluated by scientists from the Army Research Laboratory. The device was first field tested in Afghanistan in 2001. By 2002, about 500 Phraselators were built for soldiers around the world with another 250 ordered by the U.S. Special Forces. The device cost $2000 to develop and could convert spoken English into one of 200,000 recorded commands and questions in 30 languages. However, the device could only translate one-way. At the time, the only existing two-way voice translator that could convert speech back and forth between languages was the Audio Voice Translation Guide System, or TONGUES, which was developed by Carnegie Mellon University for Lockheed Martin.

As part of a DARPA program known as the Spoken Language Communication and Translation System for Tactical Use, SRI International has further developed two-way translation software for use in Iraq called IraqComm in 2006 which contains a vocabulary of 40,000 English words and 50,000 words in Iraqi Arabic.

== Notable users ==
The handheld translator was recently used by U.S. troops while providing relief to tsunami victims in early 2005. About 500 prototypes of the device were provided to U.S. military forces in Operation Enduring Freedom. Units loaded with Haitian dialects have been provided to U.S. troops in Haiti. Army military police have used it in Kandahar to communicate with POWs. In late 2004, the U.S. Navy began to augment some ships with a version of the device attached to large speakers in order to broadcast clear voice instructions up to 400 yards (370 m) away. Corrections officers and law enforcement in Oneida County, New York, have tested the device. Hospital emergency rooms and health departments have also evaluated it. Several Native American tribes such as the Choctaw Nation, the Ponca, and the Comanche Nation have also used the device to preserve their dying languages. Various law enforcement agencies, such as the Los Angeles Police Department, also use the phraselator in their patrol cars.

== Awards ==
In March 2004, DARPA director Dr. Tony Tether presented the Small Business Innovative Research Award to the VoxTec division of Marine Acoustics at DARPATech 2004 in Anaheim, CA. The device was recently listed as one of "Ten Emerging Technologies That Will Change Your World" in MIT's Technology Review.

== Pop culture ==
Software developer Jack Buchanan believes that building a device similar to the fictional universal translator seen in Star Trek would be harder than building the Enterprise.

The device was mentioned in a list of "Top 10 Star Trek Tech" on Space.com.
