= Air Pollution Control Act of 1955 =

US federal law

Air Pollution Control Act
- Long title: An Act to provide research and technical assistance relating to air pollution control.
- Acronyms (colloquial): APCA
- Nicknames: Air Pollution Control Act of 1955
- Enacted by: the 84th United States Congress
- Effective: July 14, 1955

Citations
- Public law: 84-159
- Statutes at Large: 69 Stat. 322

Codification
- Titles amended: 42 U.S.C.: Public Health and Social Welfare
- U.S.C. sections created: 42 U.S.C. ch. 85 § 7401 et seq.

Legislative history
- Introduced in the Senate as S. 928; Signed into law by President Dwight D. Eisenhower on July 14, 1955

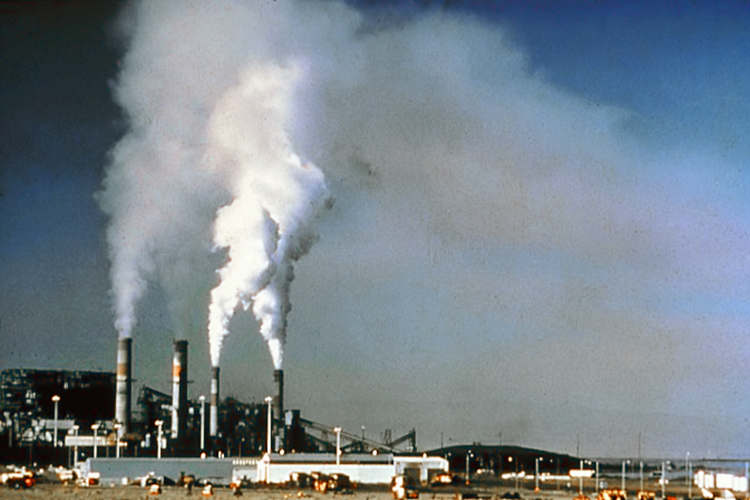
Before the Air Pollution Control Act of 1955, air pollution was not considered a national environmental problem.

The Air Pollution Control Act of 1955 (Pub. L. 84–159, ch. 360, 69 Stat. 322) was the first U.S. federal law to address the national environmental problem of air pollution. This was "an act to provide research and technical assistance relating to air pollution control". The act "left states principally in charge of prevention and control of air pollution at the source". The act declared that air pollution was a danger to public health and welfare, but preserved the "primary responsibilities and rights of the states and local government in controlling air pollution".

The act put the federal government in a purely informational role, authorizing the United States Surgeon General to conduct research, investigate, and pass out information "relating to air pollution and the prevention and abatement thereof". Therefore, The Air Pollution Control Act contained no provisions for the federal government to actively combat air pollution by punishing polluters. The next Congressional statement on air pollution would come with the Clean Air Act of 1963.

The Air Pollution Control Act was the culmination of much research done on fuel emissions by the federal government in the 1930s and 1940s. Additional legislation was passed in 1963 to better fully define air quality criteria and give more power in defining what air quality was to the Secretary of Health, Education, and Welfare. This additional legislation would provide grants to both local and state agencies. A replacement, the Clean Air Act (United States) (CAA), was enacted to replace the Air Pollution Control Act of 1955. A decade later the Motor Vehicle Air Pollution Control Act was enacted to focus more specifically on automotive emission standards. A mere two years later, the Federal Air Quality Act was established to define "air quality control regions" scientifically based on topographical and meteorological facets of air pollution.

California was the first state to act against air pollution when the metropolis of Los Angeles began to notice deteriorating air quality. The location of Los Angeles furthered the problem as several geographical and meteorological problems unique to the area exacerbated the air pollution problem.

== Prior to 1955 ==
Prior to the Air Pollution Control Act of 1955, little headway was made to initiate this air pollution reform. U.S. cities Chicago and Cincinnati first established smoke ordinances in 1881. In 1904, Philadelphia passed an ordinance limiting the amount of smoke in flues, chimneys, and open spaces. The ordinance imposed a penalty if not all smoke inspections were passed. It was not until 1947 that California authorized the creation of Air Pollution Control Districts in every county of the state.

== Amendments to the Air Pollution Control Act of 1955 ==
There have been several amendments made to The Air Pollution Act of 1955. The first amendment came in 1960, which extended research funding for four years. The next amendment came in 1962 and basically enforced the principle provisions of the original act. In addition, this amendment also called for research to be done by the Surgeon General.

In 1967, the Air Quality Act of 1967 was passed. In 1967, the Air Quality Act was enacted in order to expand federal government activities. In accordance with this law, enforcement proceedings were initiated in areas subject to interstate air pollution transport. This amendment allowed states to enact federal automobile emissions standards. Senator Edmond Muskie (D-Maine) said that this was the “first comprehensive federal air pollution control.” The National Air Pollution Control Administration then provided technical information to the states, which the states used to develop air quality standards. The NAPCA then had the power to veto any of the states' proposed emission standards. This amendment was not as effective as it was initially thought to be, with only 36 air regions designated, and as well as no states having fully developed pollution control programs. In 1969, another amendment was made to the act. This amendment further expanded the research on low emissions, fuels, and automobiles.

The 1970 amendments, also known as the Clean Air Act, completely rewrote the 1967 act. In particular, the 1970 amendments required the newly created The United States Environmental Protection Agency to set technology-based National Ambient Air Quality Standards for major new stationary sources and state air quality management programs to protect public health and welfare. In addition, the 1970 amendments required various states to submit state implementation plans for attaining and maintaining the National Ambient Air Quality Standards and required the use of air monitoring to determine if implementation plans were successful. National technology-forcing emissions standards were also set for new automobiles. This amendment allowed citizens the ability to sue polluters or government agencies for failure to abide by the act. Finally, the amendment required that by 1975, the entire United States would attain clean air status.

1990 was the most recent amendments to the act under President George H. W. Bush. The 1990 amendments granted significantly more authority to the federal government than any prior air quality legislation. Nine subjects were identified in this amendment, with smog, acid rain, motor vehicle emissions, and toxic air pollution among them. Five severity classifications were identified to measure smog. To better control acid rain, new regulatory programs were created. New and stricter emission standards were created for motor vehicles beginning with the 1995 model year. The National Emission Standards for Hazardous Air Pollutants program was created to expand much broader industries and activities.

== National Air Pollution Symposium ==
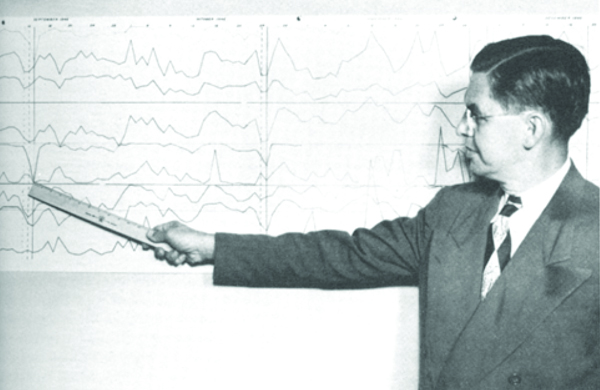
SRI participant Paul Magill discussing the smog on Black Friday in Los Angeles at the first air pollution conference in 1949

The first National Air Pollution Symposium in the United States was held in 1949 and hosted by Stanford Research Institute (now SRI International). At first, smaller governments were responsible for the passage and enforcement of such legislation. The main purpose of the Air Pollution Control Act of 1955 was to provide research assistance to find a way to control air pollution from its source. A total of $5 million was granted to the public health service for a five-year period to conduct this research. According to a private website, the amount was $3 million allotted per year for the five-year period of research.

== Effects of the Act ==
This was the first act from the government that made U.S. citizens and policy makers aware of this global problem. Unfortunately, this act did little to prevent air pollution, but it at least made government aware that this was a national problem. The act allowed Congress to reserve the right to control this growing problem. The Air Pollution Control Act of 1955 was the first federal law regarding air pollution. This act began to inform the public about the hazards of air pollution and detailed new emissions standards. Public opinion polls showed that the percentage of Americans who regarded air pollution as a serious problem almost doubled from 28% in 1965 to 55% in 1968 with the addition of all the amendments made to the original Air Pollution Control Act of 1955.

Despite having the term "control" in the title of the act, this legislation had no regulation component. In the early 1950s Congress did not want to interfere with states' rights; as such, the early laws of the act were not strong. This act set up the role that the government would play in research on air pollution effects and control. As such, the act was the forefront of the air pollution movement that continues to this day. Amendments were added to The Air Pollution Control Act of 1955 as well as the Clear Air Act frequently by the government, as the government continued to further research on the topic and improve air quality.

== See also ==
- Air pollution in the United States
