= Electronic Recording Machine, Accounting =

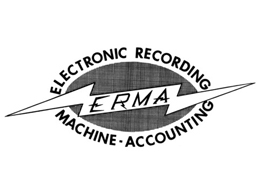
The ERMA logo

ERMA (Electronic Recording Machine, Accounting) was a computer technology that automated bank bookkeeping and check processing. Developed at the nonprofit research institution SRI International under contract from Bank of America, the project began in 1950 and was publicly revealed in September 1955.

Payments experts contend that ERMA "established the foundation for computerized banking, magnetic ink character recognition (MICR), and credit-card processing". General Electric (GE) won the production contract, deciding to transistorize the design in the process. Calling the machine the GE-100, a total of 32 ERMA machines were built. GE would use this experience to develop several mainframe computer lines before selling the division to Honeywell in 1970.

== History ==
=== Background ===
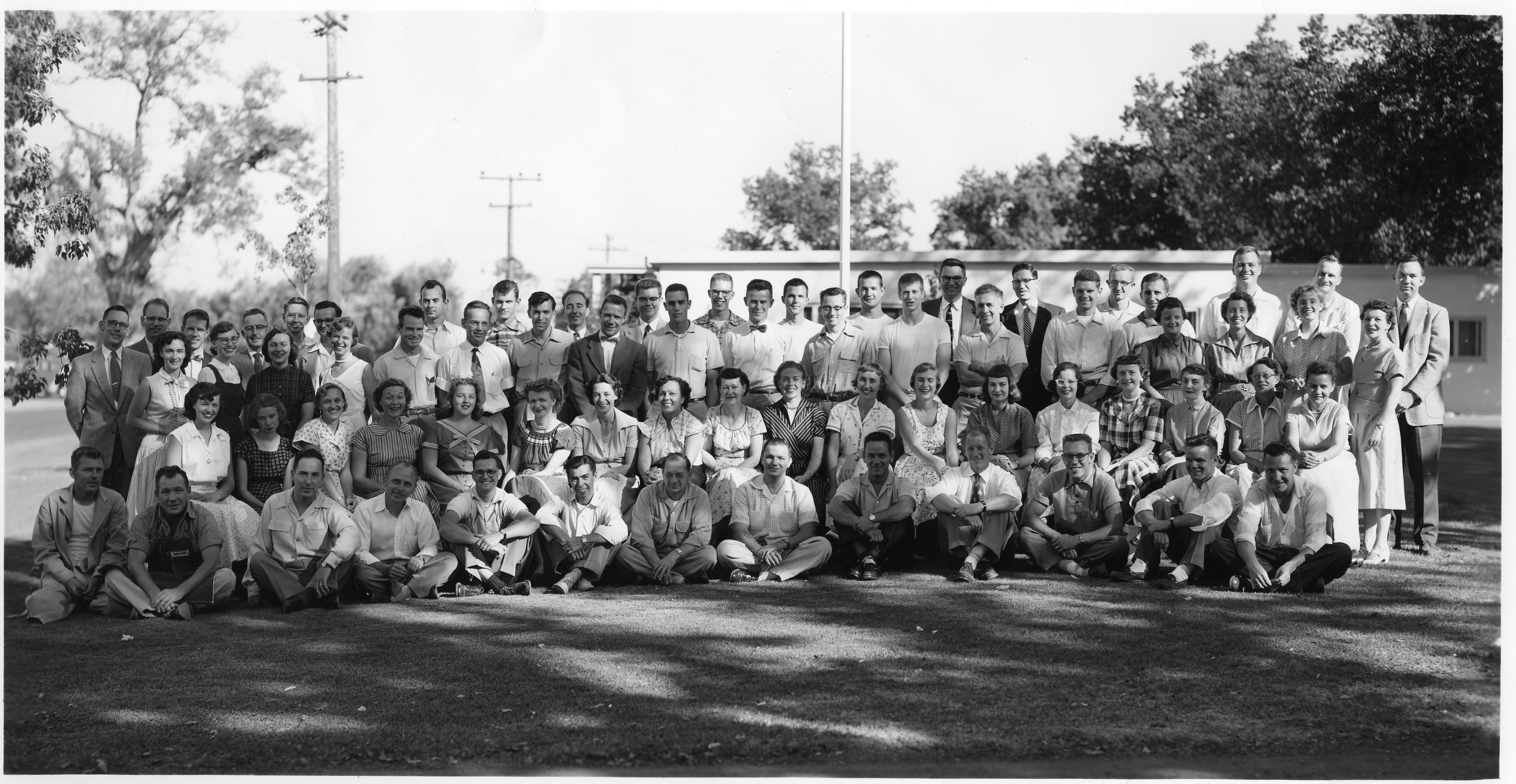
The ERMA team from SRI International

In 1950, Bank of America (BoA) was the largest bank in California, and led the world in the use of cheques. This presented a serious problem due to the workload processing time. An experienced bookkeeper could post 245 accounts in an hour, about 2,000 in an eight-hour workday and approximately 10,000 per week. Bank of America's checking accounts were growing at a rate of 23,000 per month and banks were being forced to close their doors by 2 p.m. to finish daily postings.

S. Clark Beise was a senior vice president at BoA who was introduced to Thomas H. Morrin, SRI's Director of Engineering. They formed an alliance under which SRI would essentially act as BoA's research and development arm. In July 1950 they contracted SRI for an initial feasibility study for automating their bookkeeping and check handling. ERMA was under the technical leadership of computer scientist Jerre Noe.

=== First study ===
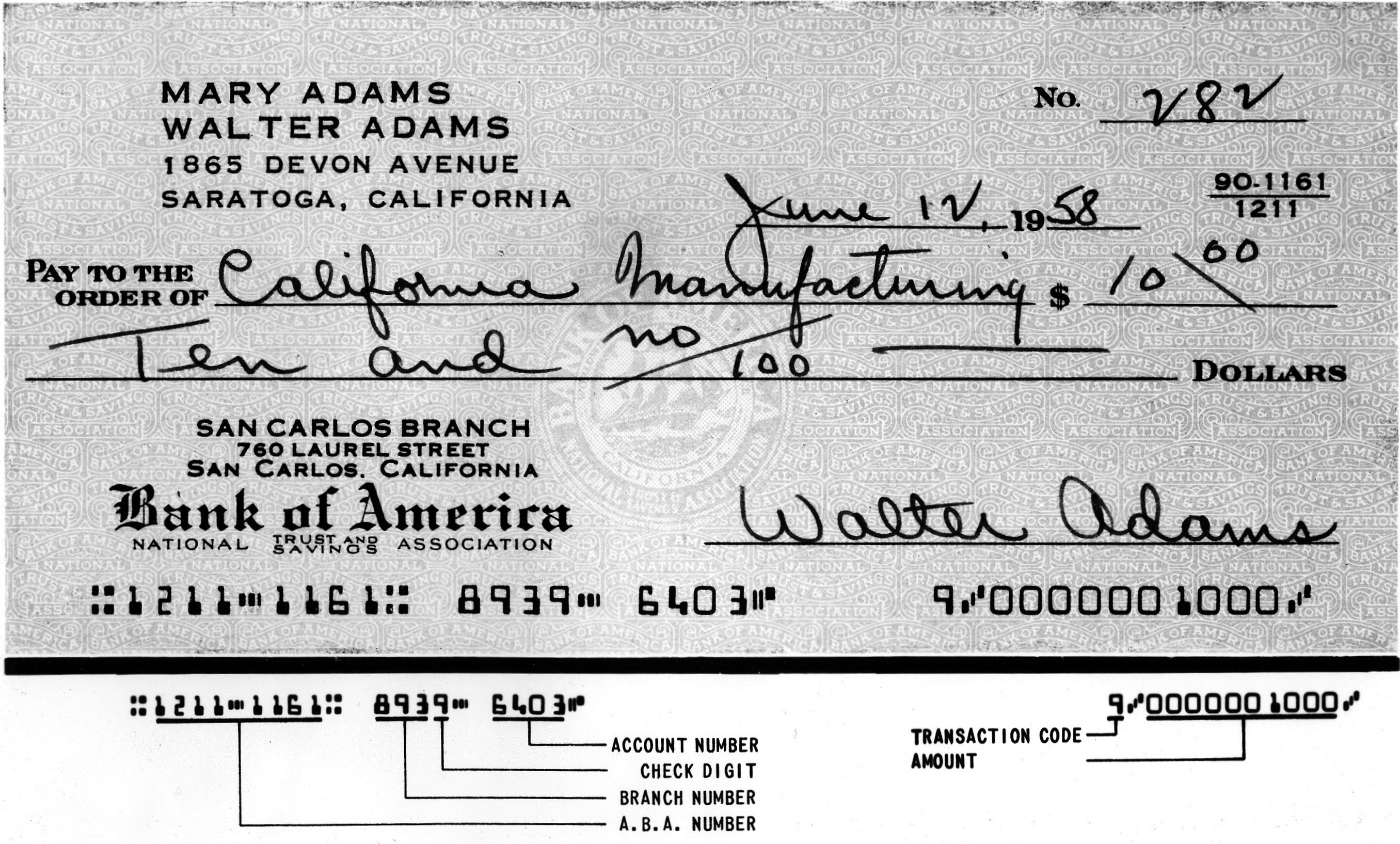
An early check, demonstrating the features developed by SRI: account numbers and Magnetic Ink Character Recognition.

SRI immediately found a problem. Because accounts were kept alphabetically, adding a new account required a reshuffling of the account listings. SRI instead suggested using account numbers, simply adding new ones to the end of the list. In addition these numbers would be pre-printed on checks, thereby dramatically reducing the time to match the checks with account information (known as "proofing"). Numbered accounts are now a feature of almost all banks.

With that problem out of the way, SRI returned a report in September 1950 that stated a computer-based system was certainly feasible, which they called the Electronic Recording Machine (ERM).

=== Second study ===
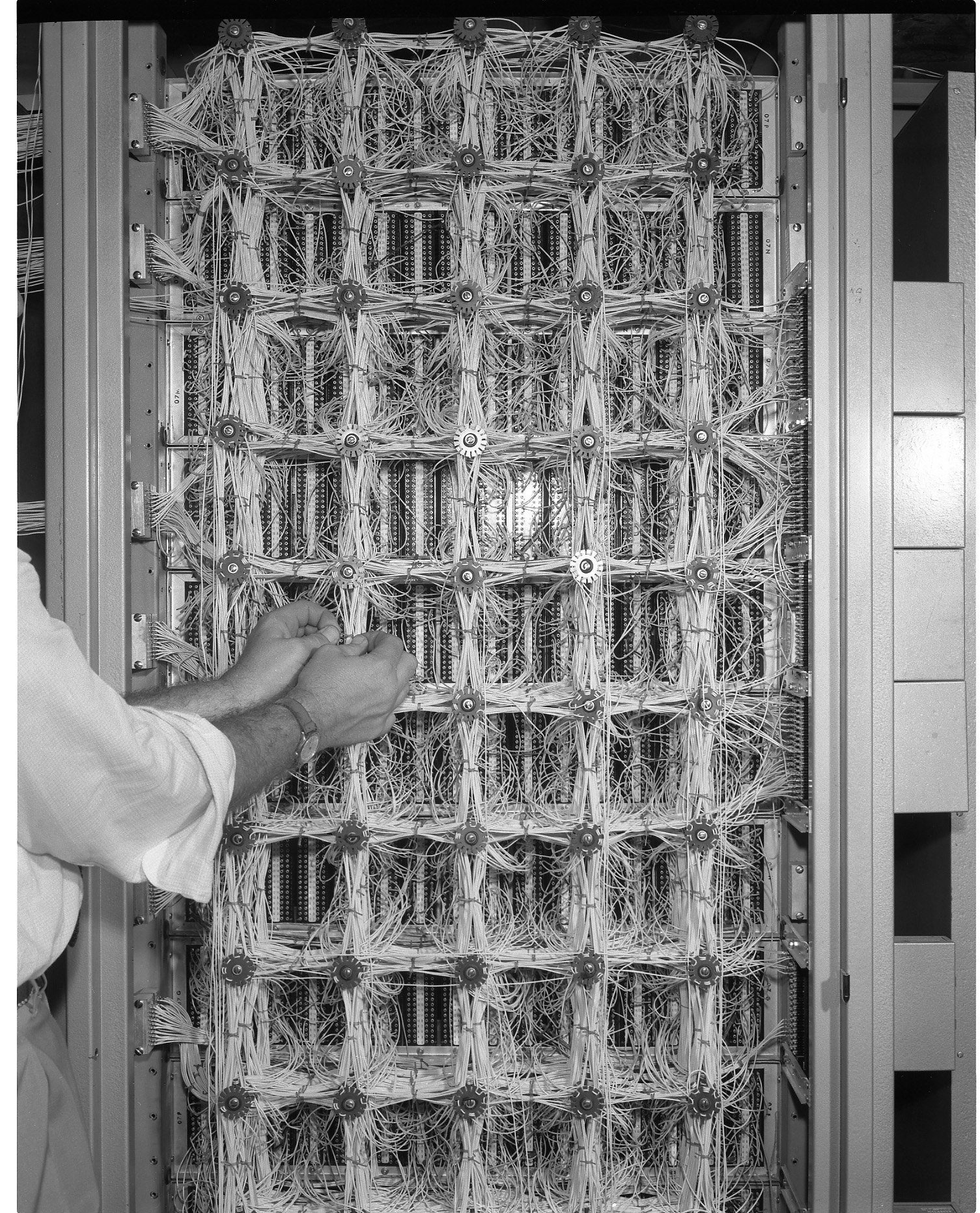
The wiring in an ERMA machine

Bank of America then offered a second six-month contract in November to fully study the changes needed to banking procedures, and design the logical layout of production ERM machines. While this was underway, Bank of America went to a number of industrial companies to set up production of the machines, but none were interested. So SRI was given another contract in January 1952 to build a prototype machine.

One of the biggest problems found in the second phase was how to input the check information, especially the account numbers, with any sort of speed. Beise demanded a system that would not require the information to be changed from one medium to another, from check to punched card for instance, while simultaneously lowering error rates.

SRI investigated several solutions to the problem, including the first OCR system from a company in Arlington, Virginia. However, they found that it was all too easy for banks, and customers, to write over the account numbers and spoil the system. They also experimented with barcode information, and while this worked well even when printed over, if there was enough "damage" to the code a human operator could not read them in order to input them manually.

Instead, they decided to combine the two technologies, and used MICR-printed account numbers which could be read by a magnetic reader similar to those in a cassette tape recorder. The resulting reader was a mechanical tour-de-force, combining five MICR readers with a large rotating drum that forced checks dumped in the top to come out the bottom single-file. The system was eventually able to read ten checks a second, with errors on the order of 1 per 100,000 checks.

=== Final prototype ===
The final ERM computer contained more than a million feet (304,800 metres) of wiring, 8,000 vacuum tubes, 34,000 diodes, 5 input consoles with MICR readers, 2 magnetic memory drums, the check sorter, a high-speed printer, a power control panel, a maintenance board, 24 racks holding 1,500 electrical packages and 500 relay packages, and 12 magnetic tape drives for 2,400-foot (731-metre) tape reels.

ERM weighed about 25 tons (22.7 tonnes), used more than 80 kW of power and required cooling by an air conditioning system. By 1955, the system was still in development, but BoA was anxious to announce the project. At the time, computers (still known as "electronic brains") were all the rage; if BoA could announce that they were using them, it would convey a sense of futuristic infallibility. In September 1955, BoA froze the design.

By this point, no fewer than 24 companies had expressed interest in building the production machines, and General Electric won the competition. Among GE's team members was AI pioneer and early critic Joseph Weizenbaum. The company took the basic design, but decided it was time to move the tube-based system to a transistor-based one using core memory. This won SRI yet another contract, this time by GE, to study the commercial computer market and suggest how ERM machines could be sold into other markets. After the construction run, they also contracted them to dispose of the original machine.

== Legacy ==
The first production ERMA system, known as the GE-100, was installed in 1959. Over the next two years 32 systems were installed and by 1966 twelve regional ERMA centers served all but 21 of Bank of America's 900 branches. The centers handled more than 750 million checks a year, about the number they had predicted to occur by 1970. The automation was so effective that it allowed Bank of America to be the first bank to offer credit cards attached to a user's bank account. They were so successful in operation that Bank of America was propelled ahead of other banks in profitability, and became the world's largest bank by 1970.

ERMA machines were replaced with newer equipment in the early 1970s. There is a special room commemorating ERMA machines inside the Bank of America facilities in Concord, California.

Payments experts contend that ERMA "established the foundation for computerized banking, magnetic ink character recognition (MICR), and credit-card processing".
