= Deafnet =

Deafnet (or DEAFNET) was created as a demonstration project in 1978 by SRI International (previously known as Stanford Research Institute) at Washington's Gallaudet University for the deaf. It was funded by The United States Department of Health, Education, and Welfare to demonstrate the advantages of e-mail for deaf people.

Deafnet was the first real use of the telecommunications device for the deaf. Deafnet offered a way for hearing impaired people, whose information sources have previously been limited by their available channels of communication, to interact with and benefit from the new communications-based society. Deafnet was designed as a Computer System, integrating devices designed for hearing impaired users as well as standard computer terminals. DEAFNET also introduced real time 'chat' in which users could converse in real time using text.

The standard equipment consisted of a Zenith ZT-1 terminal, a Superphone (a terminal with built-in coupler that allows for either Baudot or ASCII hookup as well as a 1000 character buffer), and an Epson printer. The Superphone device retailed for $495 in 1981.

DEAFNET was considered a viable alternative for reduced costs in telecommunications for the deaf, however the advent of ASCII compatible terminals and eventually the Internet superseded its need.

== References and External links ==
- Deafnet at SRI's web site
