= Elmer Robinson (meteorologist) =

American atmospheric scientist

Elmer Robinson (right) with his research collaborator R. C. Robbins (left) in the later 1960s; picture from the Stanford Research Institute.

Elmer Robinson (October 3, 1924 - April 24, 2016) was an American atmospheric scientist. He was one of the first scientists to recognise climate-change risks in fossil fuel burning, co-authoring, with R C Robbins, another Stanford Research Institute (SRI) researcher, reports warning the industry in 1968 and 1969.

== Early life ==
Robinson was born in Los Angeles, California, to Homer Henry Robinson and Mary Luella White. He attended Hoover High School in Glendale and went on to take BS and MS degrees at University of California, Los Angeles (UCLA).

== Career ==
Robinson joined SRI as a climate researcher in 1947 and continued on there until taking up a professorship at Washington State University in 1972 where he remained until 1985. In his capacity as leading environmental scientist at SRI in 1968, his report on global warming entitled Sources, abundance, and fate of gaseous atmospheric pollutants was presented to the American Petroleum Institute (API). In the report, he warned that rising carbon dioxide concentrations in the atmosphere "may be the cause of serious world-wide environmental changes", a warning elaborated on in a 1969 supplement to the report.

Also while at SRI, Robinson carried out ice-core studies of historical atmospheric CO_{2} concentrations on cores taken in Greenland and surveyed the ozone layer depletion over Antarctica.

He was director of the National Oceanic and Atmospheric Administration's Mauna Loa Research Observatory in Hawaii from 1985 to 1996, a role in which he was interviewed for National Geographic in 1987.
