= Otto H. Schade =

German-American electro-optical engineer (1903–1981)

Otto H. Schade (April 27, 1903 – April 28, 1981) was a television pioneer, best known for his work on evaluating the gradation, graininess and sharpness in film and television images, and his aperture theory that mathematically modeled the system performance of photographic lenses, films, television tubes, and electrical circuits.

== Early life and education ==
Otto H. Schade was born on April 27, 1903 in Schmalkalden, Germany.

He graduated in 1922 from the Reform-Real-Gymnasium in Halle, Germany.

== Career ==
After graduating, Schade worked at Telephonfabrik A.G. vorm. J. Berliner in Berlin and Düsseldorf (1922–1924), and at the Ratig company in Berlin (1924–1925). He then emigrated to the United States to work at A. Atwater Kent in Philadelphia (1926–1931).

In 1931 Schade joined the Radio Corporation of America (RCA), where he spent the remainder of his career. From 1944 to 1957, he developed a unified theory of image analysis and specification, including practical methods for measuring the optical transfer function and noise in optical, photographic, and electronic imaging systems. In 1958 he began a study leading to the Nuvistor low-noise tubes for television receivers.

He received 85 patents.

He retired from RCA in 1968, continuing as a consultant until 1974.

== Recognition and awards ==
Schade was a member of the National Academy of Engineering, and a Fellow of the Institute of Electrical and Electronics Engineers and the Society of Motion Picture and Television Engineers.

He received numerous honours and awards, including an honorary doctorate of engineering from Rensselaer Polytechnic Institute (1953), Modern Pioneer Award of the National Association of Manufacturers (1940), the RCA Victor Award of Merit (1946), the IEEE Morris N. Liebmann Memorial Award (1950), the first David Sarnoff Gold Medal Award (in 1951), David Sarnoff Outstanding Achievement Award (1968), and the Vladimir K. Zworykin Award (1969).

== Death and legacy ==
Schade died on April 28, 1981.

The Society for Information Display awards a prize in his honor.
