= Jerre Noe =

American computer scientist

- Born: February 1, 1923; McCloud, California
- Died: November 12, 2005 (aged 82)
- Education: UC Berkeley; Stanford University
- Scientific career
- Workplaces: SRI International; University of Washington
- Doctoral advisor: William R. Hewlett

Jerre Noe (February 1, 1923 – November 12, 2005) was an American computer scientist. In the 1950s, he led the technical team for the ERMA project, the Bank of America's first venture into computerized banking. In 1968 he became the first chair of the University of Washington's Computer Science Group, which later evolved into the Computer Science and Engineering Department.

== Early life and education ==
Noe was born in McCloud, California. He received a Bachelor's degree in electrical engineering from the University of California, Berkeley. Stationed in Europe during World War II, he conducted research and development related to radar, before returning to California to complete a Ph.D. in electrical engineering at Stanford University.

== Career ==
During the 1950s, Noe served as the assistant director of Engineering at Stanford Research Institute (now SRI International), during which time he led the technical team for the Electronic Recording Machine, Accounting (ERMA) project. Noe and the ERMA team were honored by SRI in 2001 with the Weldon B. Gibson Achievement Award for their work.

In 1968 he was recruited by the University of Washington to chair its newly founded Computer Science Group, a role in which he continued until 1976. Initially, this was mainly a graduate department but in 1975 it introduced a baccalaureate program. In the early 1980s, Noe directed the Eden Project, the first recipient of the National Science Foundation's Coordinated Experimental Research Program award, which brought U.W. into the first rank of Computer Science departments.

== Retirement ==
After retirement from the department in 1989, Noe continued a very active life until 2005. He remained active in his department as a professor emeritus and in other aspects of his life; in his late seventies, he and his wife trekked approximately 100 miles (160 km) across the Basque Country. He was also an avid flautist, sailor and skier into his eighties.

== Personal life ==
Jerre Noe married Mary Ward in 1943. They had three children: Sherill, Jeffrey and Russell. Mary Noe died of cancer in 1982. Jerre married Margarete Wöhlert in 1983.

On November 12, 2005, Noe died from peritoneal mesothelioma, a rare form of cancer caused by exposure to asbestos that attacks the lining of the abdomen. He was 82 years old.
