= National Air Pollution Symposium =

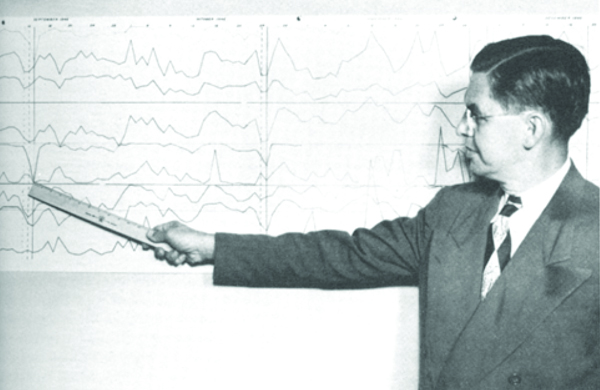
SRI participant Paul Magill discussing the smog on Black Friday in Los Angeles at the first National Air Pollution Symposium in 1949

The National Air Pollution Symposium was held on November 10–11, 1949 in Pasadena, California by the Stanford Research Institute (now SRI International), along with assistance from the California Institute of Technology, the University of Southern California and the University of California.

SRI had performed much of the early research on air pollution and the formation of ozone in the lower atmosphere. About 400 scientists, businessmen, and politicians attended the event, which was the first event of its kind. The conference (and subsequent conferences) spurred some of the early pollution and climate change research, as well as early climate change legislation including the Air Pollution Control Act of 1955.
