= Air pollution control law in New Jersey =

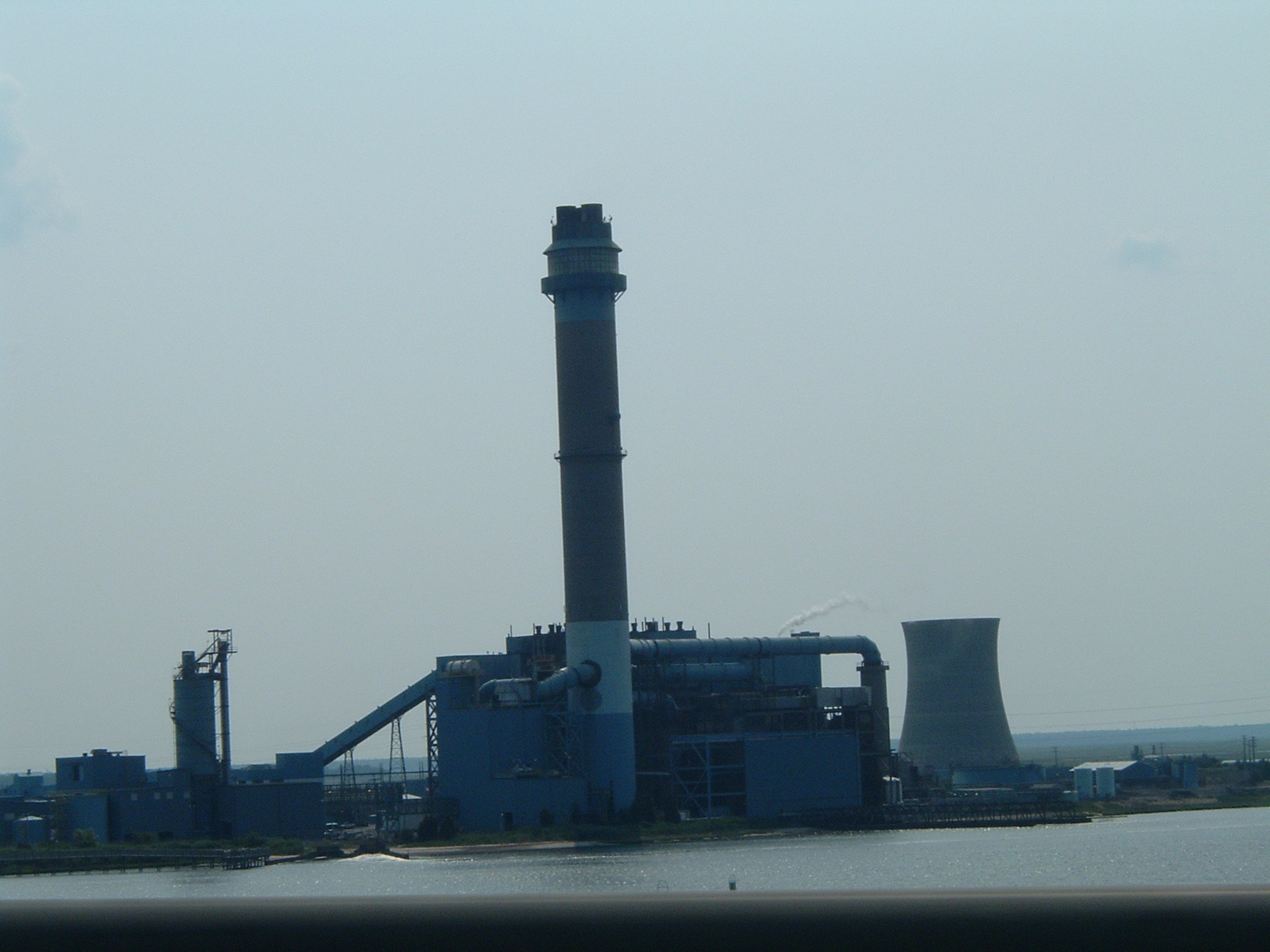
Coal burning power plants, such as the B.L. England Generating Station in Upper Township, New Jersey, are regulated under New Jersey air pollution law.

New Jersey Air Pollution Control Law consists of legislative and regulatory measures intended to limit the amount of harmful substances found in the air. In New Jersey, the federal Clean Air Act and the state Air Pollution Control Act (1954) are the most significant pieces of air pollution control legislation. These laws are implemented and enforced by the New Jersey Department of Environmental Protection (NJDEP).

== Air Pollution Control Act (1954) ==
=== Background ===
In the 1940s and 1950s, the industrialization associated with World War II caused an increase in air pollution emissions throughout the United States, and various governmental officials and engineers began to recognize that emissions were becoming a public health problem. In addition, the public's interest was spurred by the 1948 Donora smog, which killed 20 people in Pennsylvania. This led to the first National Air Pollution Symposium in 1949 at the Stanford Research Institute, and, in 1950, to the first United States Technical Conference on Air Pollution, which was convened by President Harry Truman.

New Jersey followed the national trend, and, in 1950, the state established its own study commission to examine the issue of air pollution and to make legislative recommendations. The commission issued its report in 1952. In it, the authors urge for a state-wide approach to the issue of air pollution, which had hitherto been regulated only by local ordinances. Discussing a survey that faculty members of Rutgers University had distributed to local boards of health at the request of the commission, the report states:

Seventy-two replies, an overwhelming majority of the 95 reporting complaints, expressed the opinion that any contemplated legislation should be enacted on the State level, since local officials seem to be powerless or unwilling to take proper action. In some instances, this is probably due to the fact that sufficient evidence about the pollutant or against the perpetrator could not be obtained, while in other cases, probably the local officials did not care to jeopardize their positions in the community by taking action.

The state Legislature was further roused to action by a so-called "smog week" during November 17–22, 1953. During the incident, meteorological conditions trapped air pollutants all across the eastern seaboard, and many New Jerseyans particularly in Elizabeth and Linden, suffered eye and throat irritation due to increased levels of sulfur dioxide and aldehydes. The incident was serious enough to be investigated by the state Department of Health. In addition, a later study conducted by the New York City Department of Air Pollution Control demonstrated a significant increase in mortality in New York City during the incident.

=== Enactment ===
In 1954, the state Legislature passed the Air Pollution Control Act, which became the third statewide air pollution control law in the United States, following measures passed in Oregon and Massachusetts. The original version of the law was fairly modest in scope, however. It established a commission, known as the Air Pollution Control Commission, composed of a combination of government officials and members of the public. The commission was given the authority to adopt rules and regulations controlling air pollution in the state. The law also authorized the creation of county air pollution control boards, which were to be given the authority to adopt stricter air pollution regulations on a countywide basis, provided that the state commission approved. Finally, the law gave the state Department of Health the authority to seek injunctions against polluters that violated the law's provisions and to seek monetary penalties of $100 per week (roughly equal to $1,000 in 2020 dollars). Nevertheless, even contemporary commentators recognized that the law was significant because it shifted air pollution regulation away from nuisance common law, in which persons had to be directly harmed by pollution in order to seek compensation, into administrative law, in which the government would use executive agencies to directly regulate the sources of pollution.

The Air Pollution Control Commission promulgated its first set of rules and regulations, known as the New Jersey Air Pollution Control Code in 1956. The substance of the code was fairly minimal, dealing mostly with the open burning of trash at landfills. Subsequent regulations, adopted in 1958, were more ambitious. One prohibited the operation of any fuel-burning equipment that emitted smoke "the shade or appearance of which is darker than No.2 of the Ringelmann Smoke Chart," and another limited the emissions of ash from the combustion of coal or wood burning equipment, using various limits (measured in pounds emitted per hour) depending on the size of the equipment. These latter regulations thus begin to resemble modern air pollution control regulations.

=== Supplements and amendments ===
The following table summarizes the various amendments and supplements to the Air Pollution Control Act (1954) by the New Jersey Legislature (as of September 2020).

Amendments and Supplements to the Air Pollution Control Act (1954)
Pamphlet law	Synopsis
P.L.1962, c.215	Authorizes Department of Health to issue cease and desist orders, increases penalties for violating act.
P.L.1966, c.16	Authorizes Air Pollution Control Commission to regulate exhaust from automobiles; implements federal National Emissions Standards Act.
P.L.1967, c.105	Makes changes to penalty provisions.
P.L.1967, c.106	Abolishes Air Pollution Control Commission and transfers powers to Department of Health; establishes advisory Clean Air Council; establishes pre-construction permit program.
P.L.1967, c.108	"Air Pollution Emergency Control Act (1967)" - authorizes Governor to regulate pollution during emergency events.
P.L.1970, c.33	"Department of Environmental Protection Act of 1970" - transfers administration and enforcement of act to DEP.
P.L.1970, c.274	Makes changes to Clean Air Scholarship Intern Program.
P.L.1971, c.155	Authorizes DEP to charge fees for pre-construction permits.
P.L.1973, c.102	Adds Commissioner of Health to Clean Air Council.
P.L.1985, c.12	Makes changes to penalty provisions.
P.L.1985, c.430	Alters membership of Clean Air Council.
P.L.1989, c.333	Makes knowing or reckless violations of the act a criminal offense.
P.L.1993, c.69	Authorizes DEP to adopt low-emission vehicle standards similar to those in California.
P.L.1993, c.89	Provides affirmative defense to certain air pollution control violations due to malfunctions.
P.L.1993, c.257	Removes provision making registration information of air polluters privileged and inadmissible in courts.
P.L.1994, c.101	Allows certain applicants to install and operate air pollution control equipment during permit review process.
P.L.1995, c.112	"Federal Clean Air Mandate Compliance Act" - implements enhanced motor vehicle inspection and maintenance program in response to the requirements of the federal Clean Air Act Amendments of 1990.
P.L.1995, c.157	Establishes programs for the regulation of exhaust emissions from heavy duty-diesel trucks and certain other diesel-powered motor vehicles.
P.L.1995, c.188	Reforms pre-construction permitting program; establishes operating permit program; establishes small business compliance assistance program; establishes emissions trading and banking program.
P.L.1999, c.100	Prohibits DEP from regulating emissions from hospital disinfectants if regulation diminishes efficacy of disinfectant.
P.L.2002, c.34	Makes changes to fees associated with act.
P.L.2003, c.266	Requires DEP to implement California Low Emission Vehicle program beginning on January 1, 2009 under certain circumstances; establishes review commission; establishes incentive for purchase or lease of zero emission vehicle.
P.L.2005, c.192	Prohibits the sale of gasoline containing MTBE.
P.L.2005, c.219	Establishes requirements for reducing fine particle diesel emissions from certain vehicles and equipment; creates fund for financing costs associated therewith; increases penalties for idling and authorizes DEP to establish additional restrictions on school bus idling.
P.L.2006, c.94	Extends date for certain submittals required pursuant to diesel emissions law; authorizes DEP to disapprove cost estimates for retrofit technology under certain conditions; modifies requirement to sell, distribute, and use ultra low sulfur diesel fuel.
P.L.2007, c.112	"Global Warming Response Act" - establishes goals for greenhouse gas emissions.
P.L.2007, c.340	Authorizes auction of greenhouse gas allowances; establishes "Global Warming Solutions Fund."
P.L.2010, c.57	The "Offshore Wind Economic Development Act" - authorizes funds from "Global Warming Solutions Fund" to be used for offshore wind development.
P.L.2015, c.43	Prohibits retrofitting diesel-powered vehicles to increase particulate emissions for the purpose of "coal rolling"; prohibits the practice of "coal rolling".
P.L.2017, c.386	Extends warranty for partial zero emission vehicles.
P.L.2018, c.3	Requires NJ to join U.S. Climate Alliance to uphold Paris Climate Accord.
P.L.2019, c.197	Establishes new timeframes for implementation of, and revises, certain requirements in "Global Warming Response Act."
P.L.2019, c.319	Requires State to use 20-year time horizon and most recent Intergovernmental Panel on Climate Change Assessment Report when calculating global warming potential to measure global warming impact of greenhouse gases.
P.L.2019, c.328	Clarifies intent of P.L.2007, c.340 regarding NJ's required participation in Regional Greenhouse Gas Initiative.
P.L.2019, c.362	Authorizes funds from the "Global Warming Solutions Fund" to be used for initiatives to increase use of plug-in electric vehicles.
P.L.2019, c.507	Prohibits sale, lease, rent or installation of certain equipment or products containing hydrofluorocarbons or other greenhouse gases.
P.L.2020, c.38	Establishes NJ Fuel Cell Task Force to increase use of fuel cells in State.

=== Current law ===
The Air Pollution Control Act (1954) occupies sections 26:2C-1 through 26:2C-68 of New Jersey's statutes. The law has three main effects. First, it requires New Jerseyans to register their motor vehicles and to get their vehicles periodically inspected to make sure the vehicles have pollution mitigating devices such as catalytic converters and that their emissions meet certain standards. The law also imposes additional requirements on owners of large diesel-powered vehicles like busses and off-road diesel-powered equipment like excavators. The provisions concerning motor vehicles occupy sections 26:2C-8.1 through 26:2C-8.57 of New Jersey's statutes.

Second, the law requires that operators of equipment that produces a significant amount of air pollution obtain an operating permit from the NJDEP. Such a permit may, for example, require that specific pollution-reducing technology be used or that the equipment can only be operated during certain times of day. The law delegates to the NJDEP the authority to determine what qualifies as a "significant" source of air pollution. The definition can be found in the New Jersey Administrative Code (N.J.A.C.) at N.J.A.C. 7:27-8.2. The permitting requirements apply to major sources of air pollution, such as power plants and oil refineries, but also to small facilities like universities and sewage substations. The NJDEP maintains a map of covered facilities. The provisions covering stationary sources of air pollution occupy sections 26:2C-9 through 26:2C-25.2 of New Jersey's statutes.

Third, the Global Warming Response Act was enacted as a supplement to the Air Pollution Control Act (1954) in 2007. It establishes various targets for state greenhouse gas emissions. Later supplements to the Global Warming Response Act have involved incentivizing the use of electric vehicles and the prohibiting the sale of products that use hydrofluorocarbons.

== Clean Air Act ==
Although the federal Clean Air Act was first enacted in 1963, the federal government's role was at first largely confined to providing information to the states. The 1965 amendments, also known as the National Emissions Standards Act or the Motor Vehicle Air Pollution Control Act, required auto manufacturers to improve the emissions from cars manufactured after 1968. This represented a substantial step toward reducing air pollution. New Jersey implemented these amendments in state law through Chapter 16 of the Laws of 1966.

However, the 1970 amendments were responsible for introducing most of the requirements that are now commonly associated with the act. The 1970 amendments required states to create a State Implementation Plan (SIP) and get it approved by the newly created Environmental Protection Agency. The SIP had to demonstrate how the state would conform to the new National Ambient Air Quality Standards (NAAQS) for ozone, atmospheric particulate matter, lead, carbon monoxide, sulfur oxides, and nitrogen oxides. The 1970 amendments also introduced standards for a wide variety of toxic chemicals, known as National Emissions Standards for Hazardous Air Pollutants (NESHAPs). Finally the 1970 amendments imposed new requirements for sources of air pollution constructed or install after 1970, known as New Source Performance Standards.

1990 amendments expanded and strengthened the regulations of the Clean Air Act, as well as introducing the operating permit requirement for major stationary sources. In New Jersey, the operating permit program was implemented in state law through Chapter 188 of the Laws of 1995.

New Jersey's implementation of the federal Clean Air Act is summarized in the State Implementation Plan. This provides a list of the laws, regulations, and other documents that demonstrate to the satisfaction of the EPA that the state's air pollution control laws and programs are sufficient to satisfy the requirements of federal law. The SIP for New Jersey is published as section 52.1570 of Title 40 of the Code of Federal Regulations (40 CFR §52.1570).

== State Regulations and Programs ==
The NJDEP adopts rules and regulations to implement New Jersey's air pollution laws. These rules and regulations go into greater depth and detail than the statutes. The NJDEP's air pollution control rules occupy Title 7, Chapter 27 of the New Jersey Administrative Code, N.J.A.C. 7:27-1 through 34.

The NJDEP also administers the programs that implement the law on a practical level. The Bureau of Mobile Sources in the Division of Air Quality of the NJDEP oversees the motor vehicle inspection program, as well as programs to certify auto mechanics that perform repairs on motor vehicle exhaust systems, provide funding to retrofit construction equipment, administer a rebate program for purchasers of electric vehicles, and oversee mandatory retrofitting of older school busses and other diesel-powered vehicles.

The Bureau of Stationary Sources in the Division of Air Quality of the NJDEP oversees the various permitting programs for stationary sources of air pollution like power plants, sewage treatment plants, and factories. The most significant sources of air pollution are required to obtain a "Title V" operating permit (named after Title V of the federal Clear Air Act). But smaller facilities may also need to obtain a general permit, through a simpler application process.

== See also ==
- 1954 in the environment
- United States energy law
- Environmental law in New Jersey
