= Water pollution control law in New Jersey =

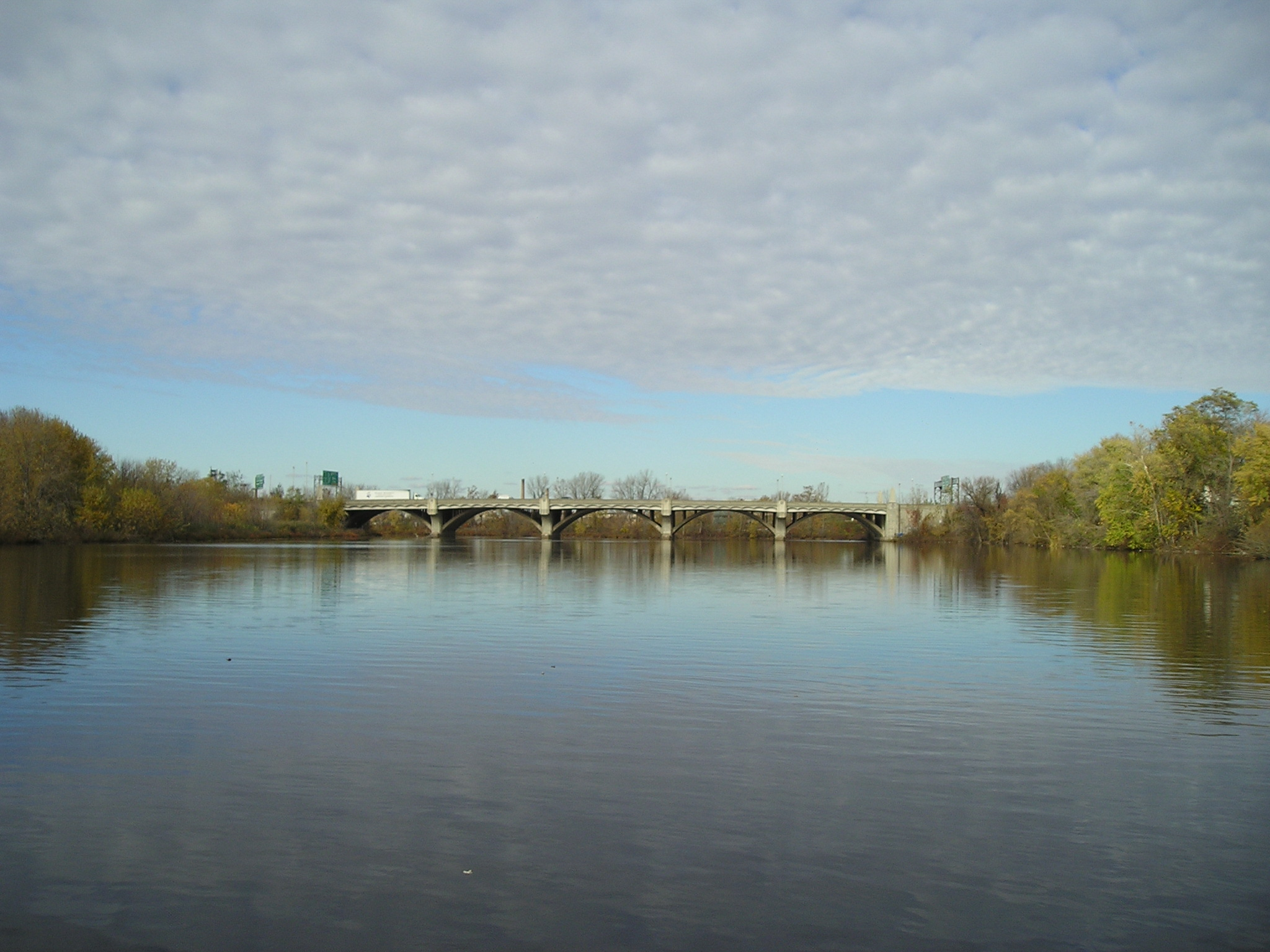
The Passaic River has a long history of water pollution from industrial waste, particularly the Lower Passaic, which from stretches from Dundee Dam to the river mouth at Newark Bay.

New Jersey Water Pollution Control Law consists of legislative and regulatory measures intended to limit the amount of harmful substances found in the state's lakes, rivers, and groundwater. In New Jersey, the federal Clean Water Act and the state Water Pollution Control Act are the most significant pieces of water pollution control legislation. These laws are implemented and enforced by the New Jersey Department of Environmental Protection (NJDEP).

== Early laws ==
Prior to the mid 20th century, a common law notion of water pollution control was the guiding principle in New Jersey, as in the rest of the United States. Under this system, a person would need to cause people direct harm – by dumping waste directly into a supply of drinking water, for example – in order to be taken to court and forced to stop the action or pay remuneration. In Beach v. Sterling Iron & Zinc Co., 54 N.J. Eq. 65, for example, the owner of a paper mill successfully sued the owner of an upstream mine, because the discharge from the mine made the paper unsuitable for use in the paper mill. In the opinion, the judge, Henry Cooper Pitney, writes that "No case of a stream fouled by mining operations has indeed ever, so far as I know, been presented to our courts, but the right of a riparian proprietor to have the waters of the stream come to him unchanged in quality, as well as undiminished in quantity, has been determined in the clearest and most positive manner."

Some municipalities in New Jersey codified the common law principle in their local laws. For example, in 1843, Jersey City enacted an ordinance prohibiting people from using the city's stormwater drainage systems to drain their own toilet systems. However, it was not generally understood that discharging waste outside of the local drinking water supply could have detrimental effects on the entire river and the public health for cities downstream.

In the second half of the 19th century, population density and the frequency of disease outbreaks had increased to the point that legislators and public saw the need to regulate the use of rivers as waste receptacles. Thus, New Jersey enacted several laws that protected certain stretches of rivers, or even entire watersheds, from pollution, in particular from human waste. An early example of such a water pollution control law, which applied only to the Passaic River, was enacted in 1897. It stated that: "No person or persons, natural or artificial, shall throw, cause or permit to be thrown into the waters of the Passaic river, or of any of the tributaries thereof, above the great falls of the Passaic river at Paterson, any carcass of any dead animal or any offal or offensive matter, or any matter or thing detrimental to health."

Laws passed in the early and mid 20th century were intended to expand the state's authority to regulate the discharge of pollution into waterways. The intent and language was fairly strong. For example, Chapter 215 of New Jersey's Pamphlet Laws of 1910 stated simply that "No person shall hereafter discharge or permit to be discharged into any fresh water any sewage, excremental matter, domestic refuse or other polluting matter." Chapter 280 of New Jersey's Pamphlet Laws of 1921 even established a rudimentary permit program for factories and workshops that were to be located upstream from a municipal water supply intake. (See also P.L.1884, c.148; P.L.1899, c.41; and P.L.1921, c.46.) However, the laws delegated enforcement authority to the state Department of Health, and such departments tended to intervene only in the cases of epidemics of diseases caused by waterborne pathogens. Thus, although New Jersey had strong water pollution laws on the books in the first half of the 20th century, they were not being enforced as strongly as the letter of the laws would imply.

== Water Pollution Control Act ==
=== Background ===
Increased population and industrialization after World War II meant that water quality across the United States was in a downward spiral. Catalyzed by the publication of Silent Spring and a Time (magazine) article on the pollution of America's waterway's featuring pictures of the Cuyahoga River on fire, public opinion began to shift decisively in favor of strong governmental action to abate water pollution in the late 1960s. This led to the passage of the Federal Water Pollution Control Act Amendments of 1972, which required states to develop water quality standards and create a permit system to ensure that point sources of water pollution are regulated strongly enough that the water quality standards are met. (The passage of these amendments led to the Federal Water Pollution Control Act acquiring its more common name: the Clean Water Act.) However, New Jersey did not immediately come into compliance with the Clean Water Act. Indeed, the state was under the threat of the federal government assuming control of its water pollution program, as authorized by the Clean Water Act if states failed to meet certain standards.

The New Jersey state government therefore directed the County and Municipal Government Commission to study the issue and come up with recommendations for action. The Commission (which included Samuel Alito, Sr., the father of Supreme Court Justice Samuel Alito) released a report in 1973 entitled "Water Quality Management: New Jersey's Vanishing Options, 1973." The report concluded that:

The Federal Water Pollution Control Act Amendments of 1972 are the new umbrella for water quality management. As mentioned previously, the New Jersey water statutes do not comprehensively empower the DEP to carry out many of the activities for which it will be responsible. One option, and a real one, is to allow the Federal government to assume the State's responsibilities. This, however, will limit the State's control over its own destiny. Therefore, with the full support and cooperation of the Department of Environmental Protection, the Commission will immediately begin drafting a comprehensive water quality management act for New Jersey.

One immediate catalyst for the passage of the Water Pollution Control Act in New Jersey was a large fish-kill incident caused by the discharge of heated water by the Oyster Creek Nuclear Generating Station in Lacey Township, New Jersey. The subsequent New Jersey Supreme Court decision, State v. Jersey Central Power and Light Co., 69 N.J. 102 (1976), brought the shortcomings of the existing water pollution laws in focus, as well as the court's deference to common-law or tort principles – in which the plaintiffs needed to show damages in order to have standing in the court – despite the fact that the State brought the suit under the authority of laws that explicitly prohibited the discharge of pollutants into bodies of water. One commentator on the court's decision wrote that: "State v. Jersey Central Power & Light Co. indicates that traditional common law tort analysis might fail to provide adequate legal remedies for environmental problems" and that the "Federal Water Pollution Control Act Amendments of 1972, however, provide hope that such problems may be prevented in the future through legislative action."

=== Enactment ===
In 1977, New Jersey enacted the Water Pollution Control Act. As originally enacted, the law prohibits the discharge of any pollutant (construed very broadly and including "thermal waste," likely in response to the incident at the Oyster Creek Nuclear Station, mentioned above) in a manner which might reach the waters of the state, except in conformity with a valid permit. It also repealed the state's existing water pollution control laws spanning the time period from 1882 to 1970. The practical effect of the law was for New Jersey to take over enforcement of the Clean Water Act. Indeed, the law itself states that one motivation for its passage is to "minimize direct regulation by the Federal Government of wastewater dischargers." The bill faced little opposition, according to The New York Times:

Several Republicans tried to mount opposition to the bill because of its cost, but the debate lasted less than five minutes. Senator Joseph L. McGahn, Democrat of Absalom, the prime sponsor, said that giving the state the power to control water pollution would not be necessary if industry would voluntarily control it.

The 1977 passage of the New Jersey Water Pollution Control Act coincided with the passage of additional amendments to the Clean Water Act. These 1977 amendments were the result of a lawsuit between the Natural Resources Defense Council and Russell E. Train, the administrator of the EPA (NRDC v. Train, 8 E.R.C. 2120 (D.D.C. 1976)). The lawsuit resulted in a consent decree and the provisions of the consent decree were incorporated into the Clean Water Act, resulting in its refocus toward the control of toxic pollutants, rather than the restoration of water quality in all watersheds in the country.

=== Amendments and supplements ===
The following table summarizes the various amendments and supplements to the Water Pollution Control Act by the New Jersey Legislature (as of April 2022).

Amendments and Supplements to the Water Pollution Control Act
Pamphlet law	Summary	Additional information
P.L.1977, c.74	Original act.	Legislative history
P.L.1981, c.253	Prohibits the sale or use of halogenated hydrocarbons and aromatic hydrocarbons as sewer system cleaners.	Legislative history
P.L.1984, c.240	Provides for the seizure of vehicles used in violation of the act.	Legislative history
P.L.1986, c.102	Regulates underground petroleum and hazardous substance storage tanks; implements Federal underground storage tank program.	Legislative history
P.L.1986, c.170	Increases penalties and revises penalty section.	Legislative history
P.L.1987, c.156	"Freshwater Wetlands Protection Act"; gives DEP authority to implement the Federal wetlands protection program.	Legislative history
P.L.1988, c.56	Requires wastewater treatment plants to dispose of sludge on land according to certain standards.	Legislative history
P.L.1988, c.57	"Ocean Sludge Dumping Elimination Act"; prohibits dumping of municipal treatment sludge in the ocean.	
P.L.1988, c.61	"Ocean Dumping Enforcement Act"; establishes criminal penalties for dumping certain material in the ocean.	Legislative history
P.L.1988, c.62	"Clean Ocean Education Act;" requires DEP to publish information about ocean litter reduction activities.	
P.L.1988, c.117	Prohibits sewage discharge from watercraft into certain coastal waters.	
P.L.1989, c.119	Prohibits DEP from issuing permits which authorize ocean dumping of waste.	Legislative history; related to water pollution in Toms River
P.L.1990, c.28	Strengthens penalty and enforcement provisions; imposes new requirements on sewage treatment plants.	Legislative history
P.L.1991, c.1	Strengthens leak disclosure and abatement requirements for underground storage tanks.	
P.L.1991, c.8	Authorizes certain local governments to enforce act through civil actions or administrative orders.	Legislative history
P.L.1991, c.109	Requires DEP to proceed directly against certain sewage treatment plants that transfer improperly treated waste to sewage disposal facilities.	Legislative history
P.L.1991, c.123	Requires certification of certain persons providing on-site underground storage tank services.	Legislative history
P.L.1992, c.147	Establishes $100 cap on registration fee for residential underground storage tanks.	Legislative history
P.L.1993, c.23	Clarifies who must sign a NJPDES permit discharge monitoring report.	Legislative history
P.L.1994, c.14	Makes deadlines and standards for upgrades of underground storage tanks the same as in federal law.	Legislative history
P.L.1994, c.101	Allows certain applicants to install or operate water pollution control equipment during permit review process.	Legislative history
P.L.1995, c.16	Exempts discharges caused by attempts to clean up oil spills from Water Pollution Control Act.	Legislative history
P.L.1997, c.235	"Underground Storage Tank Finance Act"; establishes a loan and grant program to fund the upgrade and closure of underground storage tanks.	Legislative history
P.L.1997, c.236	"New Jersey Aquaculture Development Act"; authorizes DEP to exempt discharges resulting from agriculture and aquaculture.	Legislative history
P.L.1997, c.430	Exempts certain underground storage tanks located on farms from certain tank closure requirements.	Legislative history
P.L.1998, c.59	Extends compliance deadline for certain underground storage tanks over 2,000 gallons by 5 years.	Governor's press release (bill was S1159)
P.L.1999, c.89	Revises terms of grants from the "Petroleum Underground Storage Tank Remediation, Upgrade and Closure Fund."	Advance law; Governor's press release (bill was S1697)
P.L.1999, c.321	Authorizes school districts to apply for interest-free loans for the costs of cleaning up, upgrading, or closing an underground storage tank.	Governor's press release (bill was S1551)
P.L.1999, c.322	Establishes certification requirement for persons removing or installing a residential underground storage tank under 2000 gallons.	Advance law; Governor's press release (bill was S1613)
P.L.2001, c.22	Delays implementation of cap on grants from "Petroleum Underground Storage Tank Remediation, Upgrade and Closure Fund."	Legislative history; Governor's press release (bill was S1173)
P.L.2002, c.34	Directs DEP to charge administrative fees for its financial assistance programs under the Water Pollution Control Act.	Legislative history
P.L.2003, c.148	Revises criteria for financing underground storage tank closures, upgrades, and remediation.	Legislative history
P.L.2003, c.196	Prohibits discharge of untreated wastewater from Superfund former landfill sites into publicly owned sewage treatment plants.	Legislative history; Governor's press release
P.L.2004, c.6	Establishes an underground storage tank inspection program in the DEP.	Legislative history
P.L.2005, c.315	Provides for discharge of obligation to repay grants to owners of underground storage tanks under certain circumstances.	Legislative history
P.L.2006, c.58	Makes various changes to the laws governing underground storage tanks.	Legislative history
P.L.2007, c.10	Extends application deadline for financing for closure and associated remediation of regulated underground storage tanks.	Legislative history
P.L.2009, c.42	Increases cap for underground storage tank remediation grants to independent colleges.	Legislative history
P.L.2009, c.134	Requires confirmation of financial assistance for eligible homeowners voluntarily closing or replacing petroleum underground storage tanks.	Legislative history
P.L.2009, c.282	Increases civil penalties for medical waste violations and intentional ocean pollution.	Legislative history
P.L.2010, c.112	Establishes standards for certain fertilizer applications, and requires certification of professional fertilizer applicators.	Legislative history; related to nutrient pollution in Barnegat Bay;
P.L.2012, c.65	Establishes additional penalties for health care professionals who improperly dispose of medical waste in State waters.	Legislative history; related to 2008 incident
P.L.2015, c.28	Prohibits manufacture, sale or promotion of personal care products containing microbeads.	Legislative history

=== Current law ===
Currently, the Water Pollution Control Act and all its supplementary laws occupy chapter 10A of Title 58 of the Revised Statutes of New Jersey. The law represents the state's enforcement of the federal Clean Water Act. In principle, the purpose of the federal Clean Water Act is to completely eliminate water pollution. 33 U.S.C. §1251 states that "it is the national goal that the discharge of pollutants into the navigable waters be eliminated by 1985." However, in practice, as in all other states, the law allows the discharge of pollutants as long as the discharge is within the terms of a permit issued by the state Department of Environmental Protection (known as an NJPDES permit). The law's restriction on the discharge of pollutant is quite broad. "Pollutant" is defined to include hazardous or nonhazardous materials, including "dredged spoil, solid waste, incinerator residue, sewage, garbage, refuse, oil, grease, sewage sludge, munitions, chemical wastes, biological materials, radioactive substance, thermal waste, wrecked or discarded equipment, rock, sand, cellar dirt, and industrial, municipal or agricultural waste or other residue." In addition, the definition of "discharge" is quite broad. It includes the state's surface waters, such as rivers and lakes, groundwater, ocean, and "onto land or into wells from which it might flow or drain into said waters or into waters or onto lands outside the jurisdiction of the State." It also includes discharges to sewage treatment plants, i.e. disposing of waste down the drain.

The law prevents the NJDEP from issuing certain permits, including for the "discharge of any radiological, chemical or biological warfare agent or high-level radioactive waste." In addition, it prevents the NJDEP from issuing a permit for any discharge which conflicts with an area-wide plan adopted under the Water Quality Planning Act, N.J.S.A. 58:11A-1 et seq. (See "Other water pollution laws" below for more discussion of this law.) The law also contains certain exemptions, including for nonpoint source pollution and for agricultural activities. It also exempts discharges from individual waste disposal systems, which is why every resident of New Jersey is not required to obtain a water pollution permit, even though they discharge "pollutants" into sewage treatment plants on a daily basis, according to the letter of the law.

The law directs the NJDEP to enforce its requirements. It authorizes agents of the NJDEP to enter facilities that have a permit for inspection purposes. People or businesses that violate the Water Pollution Control Act can face fines of up to $50,000 per day. Persons who purposefully, knowingly, or recklessly violate that act can face criminal charges.

One of the more controversial parts of the law, concerns large underground storage tanks. In 1984, Congress amended the Resource Conservation and Recovery Act (RCRA) to establish a national regulatory framework for underground storage tanks. New Jersey became one of the first states to implement this framework when it enacted Chapter 102 of New Jersey's Pamphlet Laws for 1986 (P.L.1986, c.102), which supplemented the Water Pollution Control Act. The law requires the registration of underground storage tanks and establishes procedures for the inspection, maintenance, and removal of the tanks. It also established a fund of public money to help persons in the state to remediate or remove underground storage tanks that may be leaking. The law was amended several times in the 1990s and 2000s to address issues with the funding program.

== State regulations and programs ==
The New Jersey Department of Environmental Protection (NJDEP) implements the Water Pollution Control Act. This includes administering the massive NJPDES permit program (as of May, 2022, there were 13,873 active NJPDES permits). Sites that require an NJPDES permit include schools, campgrounds, and shopping centers, as well as large manufacturing sites. The NJDEP's Water Pollution Management Element (WPME) runs the NJPDES permit program, which includes different permits for discharges to surface water (i.e. rivers or lakes), groundwater, and stormwater (i.e. runoff from rain). Construction activities may also require a temporary NJPDES permit, since they frequently result in the discharge of silt and other contaminants into storm drains. The program also regulates sewage treatment plants. The administration of the program is divided into three bureaus, depending on the nature of the activity regulated.

=== Bureau of Surface Water and Pretreatment Permitting ===
This bureau is in charge of discharges to surface water (i.e. rivers or lakes). Facilities that would need a permit for a discharge to surface water include water treatment plants, schools with wastewater treatment plants,

=== Bureau of Stormwater Permitting ===
This bureau is responsible for controlling discharges of pollutants to surface water and ground water that represent runoff from rainfall. Facilities covered under this bureau include concentrated animal feeding operations, sand and gravel quarries, concrete manufacturing facilities, vehicle recycling centers, and large-scale construction events.

=== Bureau of Ground Water, Residuals, and Permit Administration ===
This bureau is in charge of any discharges directly into ground waters, including septic systems. The bureau also regulates the disposition of sewage sludge. The types of facilities regulated include: mines, quarries, schools, hospitals, drinking water treatment plants, certain large office buildings, industrial manufacturing facilities, campgrounds, mobile home parks, food processors, and sewage treatment plants.

The bulk of the rules and regulations implementing the federal Clean Water Act and the Water Pollution Control Act can be seen at chapters 14, 14A, 14B, and 14C of the New Jersey Administrative Code (N.J.A.C.) N.J.A.C.14A1.1 through N.J.A.C.7:14A-25.10 deal with the NJPDES program; N.J.A.C. 7:14B-1.1 through N.J.A.C.7:14B-16.11 deal with the underground petroleum tank management program; and N.J.A.C.7:14C-1.1 through N.J.A.C.7:14C-1.14 set out the DEP's sewage sludge monitoring requirements.

== Other water pollution laws ==
=== Water Quality Planning Act ===
The federal Clean Water Act included provisions to encourage the development and implementation of area-wide waste treatment management plans, which would consider the water quality of a large area, such as a county, "which, as a result of urban-industrial concentrations or other factors, have substantial water quality control problems." (33 U.S.C. §1288) New Jersey's Water Quality Planning Act (N.J.S.A. 58:11A-1 et seq.) is intended to implement these provisions of the Clean Water Act. It authorizes the Governor to designate area-wide waste treatment management planning areas in the state. The law directs the Governor to delegate authority over these planning areas to the relevant county. However, in certain cases, as when the planning area spans more than one county, the New Jersey Department of Environmental Protection governs the planning area. Not surprisingly due to New Jersey's dense population and history of manufacturing, the entirety of the state lies within a planning area. A map of the planning areas can be viewed on the NJDEP's website here. The planning area is required by the Water Quality Planning Act to formulate an area-wide water quality plan. Details about the content of the plan are stated in N.J.S.A. 58:11A-5. Significantly, the Water Pollution Control Act prevents the state from issuing a water pollution permit that conflicts with this area-wide plan, thus giving local governments the authority to exert greater control over the water pollution control in their region.

=== Water Supply Management Act ===
Although not a water pollution control law per se, the Water Supply Management Act (N.J.S.A. 58:1A-1 et seq.) deals with a related topic: ensuring that surface and ground water diversions do not exceed the sustainable yield of available water resources and do not adversely impact existing users of a particular lake, river, stream, etc. This includes ensuring that the diversion of water will not lead to increased saltwater intrusion or to the spread of groundwater pollution. The NJDEP's Bureau of Water Allocation implements the "Water Supply Management Act" by requiring a permit for all ground and surface water diversions in the State that are in excess of 100,000 gallons of water per day. This includes water diverted for public water supply, industrial processing and cooling, irrigation, sand and gravel operations, remediation, and power generation. The Water Supply Allocation rules are found at N.J.A.C.7:19-1 et seq.

== See also ==
- Environmental law in New Jersey
