= SRI International =

American scientific research institute (founded 1946)

Coordinates: 37.4566°N 122.1753°W

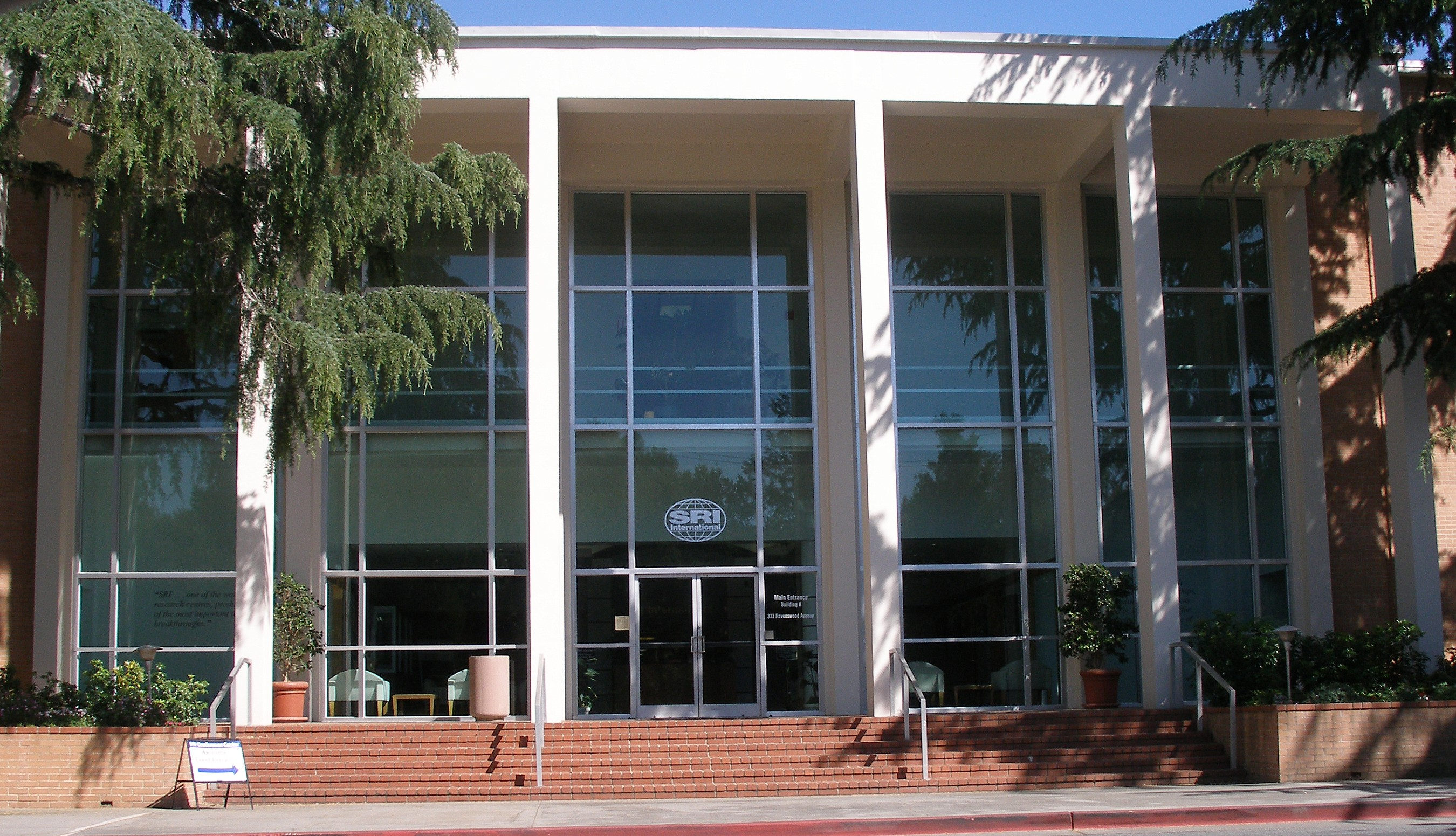
- SRI International's headquarters in Menlo Park, California
- Formerly: Stanford Research Institute (1946–1970)
- Type: Private
- Industry: Research and development
- Founded: 1946; 80 years ago, in Menlo Park, California
- Founder: Trustees of Stanford University
- Headquarters: Menlo Park, California, U.S.
- Area served: Worldwide
- Key people: David Parekh (CEO)
- Services: Scientific research
- Revenue: US$410 million (2022)
- Number of employees: 2,100 (as of February 2015)
- Website: www.sri.com

SRI International, originally the Stanford Research Institute (SRI), is a nonprofit scientific research institute and organization headquartered in Menlo Park, California, United States. It was established in 1946 by trustees of Stanford University to serve as a center of innovation. The organization formally separated from Stanford University in 1970 and became known as SRI International in 1977.

SRI performs client-sponsored research and development for government agencies, commercial businesses, and private foundations. It also licenses its technologies, forms strategic partnerships, sells products, and creates spin-off companies. SRI's headquarters are located near the Stanford University campus.

SRI's annual revenue in 2014 was approximately $540 million, which tripled from 1998 under the leadership of Curtis Carlson. In 1998, the organization was on the verge of bankruptcy when Carlson took over as CEO. Over the next sixteen years with Carlson as CEO, the organizational culture of SRI was transformed. SRI tripled in size, became very profitable, and created many world-changing innovations using the NABC framework. One of its successes was Siri, a personal assistant on iPhone, which was developed by a company SRI created and then sold to Apple. William A. Jeffrey served as SRI's president and CEO from September 2014 to December 2021, and was succeeded as CEO by David Parekh.

SRI employs about 2,100 people. Sarnoff Corporation, a wholly owned subsidiary of SRI since 1988, was fully integrated into SRI on January 3, 2011.

SRI's focus areas include biomedical sciences, chemistry and materials, computing, Earth and space systems, economic development, education and learning, energy and environmental technology, security, national defense, sensing, and devices. SRI has received more than 4,000 patents and patent applications worldwide.

== History ==
=== Foundation ===
In the 1920s, Stanford University professor Robert E. Swain proposed creating a research institute in the Western United States. Herbert Hoover, then a trustee of Stanford University, was also an early proponent of an institute but became less involved with the project after being elected president of the United States. The development of the institute was delayed by the Great Depression in the 1930s and World War II in the 1940s, with three separate attempts leading to its formation in 1946.

In August 1945, Maurice Nelles, Morlan A. Visel, and Ernest L. Black of Lockheed made the first attempt to create the institute with the formation of the "Pacific Research Foundation" in Los Angeles. A second attempt was made by Henry T. Heald, then president of the Illinois Institute of Technology. In 1945, Heald wrote a report recommending a research institute on the West Coast and a close association with Stanford University with an initial grant of $500,000 (equivalent to $7,080,000 in 2025). A third attempt was made by Fred Terman, Stanford University's dean of engineering. Terman's proposal followed Heald's but focused on faculty and student research more than contract research.

The trustees of Stanford University voted to create the organization in 1946. It was structured so that its goals were aligned with the charter of the university—to advance scientific knowledge and to benefit the public at large, not just the students of Stanford University. The trustees were named as the corporation's general members, and elected SRI's directors (later known as presidents); if the organization were dissolved, its assets would return to Stanford University.

Research chemist William F. Talbot became the institute's first director. Stanford University president Donald Tresidder instructed Talbot to avoid work that would conflict with the interests of the university, particularly federal contracts that might attract political pressure. The drive to find work and the lack of support from Stanford faculty caused the new research institute to violate this directive six months later through the pursuit of a contract with the Office of Naval Research. This and other issues, including frustration with Tresidder's micromanagement of the new organization, caused Talbot to repeatedly offer his resignation, which Tresidder eventually accepted. Talbot was replaced by Jesse Hobson, who had previously led the Armour Research Foundation, but the pursuit of contract work remained.

=== Early history ===
SRI's first research project investigated whether the guayule plant could be used as a source of natural rubber. During World War II, rubber was imported into the U.S. and was subject to shortages and strict rationing. From 1942 to 1946, the United States Department of Agriculture (USDA) supported a project to create a domestic source of natural rubber. Once the war ended, the United States Congress cut funding for the program; in response, the Office of Naval Research created a grant for the project to continue at SRI, and the USDA staff worked through SRI until Congress reauthorized funding in 1947.

SRI's first economic study was for the United States Air Force. In 1947, the Air Force wanted to determine the expansion potential of the U.S. aircraft industry; SRI found that it would take too long to escalate production in an emergency. In 1948, SRI began research and consultation with Chevron Corporation to develop an artificial substitute for tallow and coconut oil in soap production; SRI's investigation confirmed the potential of dodecylbenzene as a suitable replacement. Later, Procter & Gamble used the substance as the basis for Tide laundry detergent.

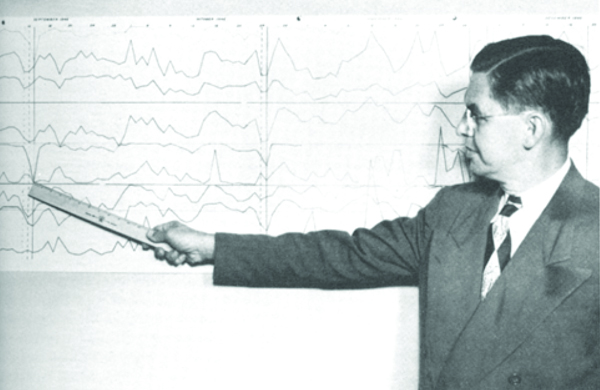
SRI participant Paul Magill discussing the smog on Black Friday in Los Angeles at the first National Air Pollution Symposium in 1949

The institute performed much of the early research on air pollution and the formation of ozone in the lower atmosphere. SRI sponsored the First National Air Pollution Symposium in Pasadena, California, in November 1949. Experts gave presentations on pollution research, exchanged ideas and techniques, and stimulated interest in the field. The event was attended by 400 scientists, business executives, and civic leaders from the U.S. SRI co-sponsored subsequent events on the subject.

In April 1953, Walt and Roy Disney hired SRI (and in particular, Harrison Price) to consult on their proposal for establishing an amusement park in Burbank, California. SRI provided information on location, attendance patterns, and economic feasibility. SRI selected a larger site in Anaheim, prepared reports about the operation, provided on-site administrative support for Disneyland, and acted in an advisory role as the park expanded. In 1955, SRI was commissioned to select a site and provide design suggestions for the John F. Kennedy Center for the Performing Arts.

In 1952, the Technicolor Corporation contracted with SRI to develop a near-instantaneous, electro-optical alternative to the manual timing process during film copying. In 1959, the Academy of Motion Picture Arts and Sciences presented the Scientific and Engineering Award jointly to SRI and Technicolor for their work on the design and development of the Technicolor electronic printing timer which greatly benefited the motion picture industry. In 1954, Southern Pacific asked SRI to investigate ways of reducing damage during rail freight shipments by mitigating shock to railroad box cars. This investigation led to William K. MacCurdy's development of the Hydra-Cushion technology, which remains standard.

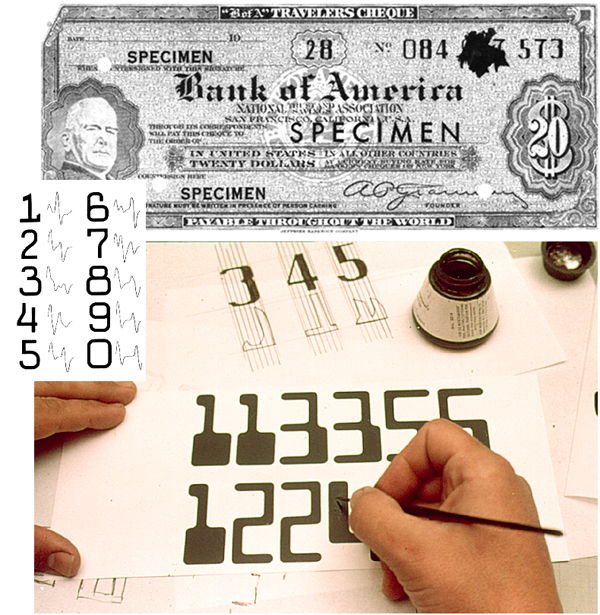
The ERMA system, which uses magnetic ink character recognition to process checks, was one of SRI's earliest developments.

In the 1950s, SRI worked under the direction of the Bank of America to develop ERMA (Electronic Recording Machine, Accounting) and magnetic ink character recognition (MICR). The ERMA project was led by computer scientist Jerre Noe, SRI's assistant director of engineering at the time. As of 2011, MICR remains the industry standard in automated check processing.

=== Rapid expansion ===
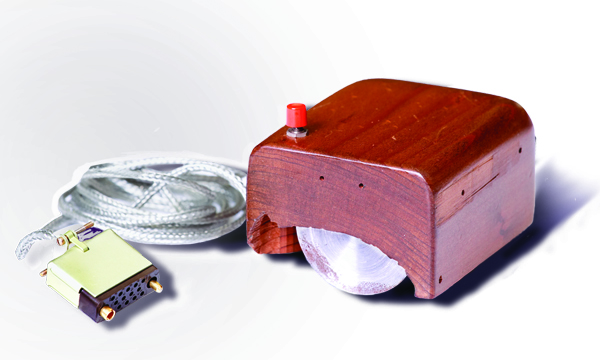
The first prototype of a computer mouse, as designed by Bill English

Douglas Engelbart, the founder of SRI's Augmentation Research Center (ARC), was the primary force behind the design and development of the multi-user oN-Line System (or NLS), featuring original versions of modern computer-human interface elements including bit-mapped displays, collaboration software, hypertext, and precursors to the graphical user interface such as the computer mouse. As a pioneer of human-computer interaction, Engelbart is arguably SRI's most notable alumnus. He was awarded the National Medal of Technology and Innovation in 2000.

Bill English, then chief engineer at ARC, built the first prototype of a computer mouse from Engelbart's design in 1964. SRI also developed inkjet printing (1961) and optical disc recording (1963). Liquid-crystal display (LCD) technology was developed at RCA Laboratories in the 1960s, which later became Sarnoff Corporation in 1988, a wholly owned subsidiary of SRI. Sarnoff was fully integrated into SRI in 2011.

In the early 1960s, Hewitt Crane and his colleagues developed the world's first all-magnetic digital computer, based upon extensions to magnetic core memories. The technology was licensed to AMP Inc., who then used it to build specialized computers for controlling tracks in the New York City Subway and on railroad switching yards.

In 1966, SRI's Artificial Intelligence Center began working on "Shakey the robot", the first mobile robot to reason about its actions. Equipped with a television camera, a triangulating rangefinder, and bump sensors, Shakey used software for perception, world-modeling, and acting. The project ended in 1972. SRI's Artificial Intelligence Center marked its 45th anniversary in 2011.

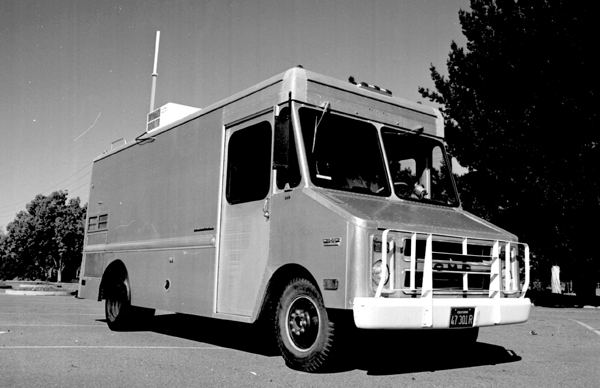
The Packet Radio Van, developed by Don Cone, was the site of the first three-way internetworked transmission.

On October 29, 1969, the first connection on a wide area network to use packet switching, ARPANET, was established between nodes at Leonard Kleinrock's laboratory at University of California, Los Angeles (UCLA) and Douglas Engelbart's laboratory at SRI using Interface Message Processors at both sites. The following year, Engelbart's laboratory installed the first TENEX system outside of BBN where it was developed. In addition to SRI and UCLA, University of California, Santa Barbara and the University of Utah were part of the original four network nodes. By December 5, 1969, the entire four-node network was connected. In the 1970s, SRI developed packet-switched radio (a precursor to wireless networking), over-the-horizon radar, Deafnet, vacuum microelectronics, and software-implemented fault tolerance.

The first true Internet transmission occurred on November 22, 1977, when SRI originated the first connection between three disparate networks. Data flowed seamlessly through the mobile Packet Radio Van between SRI in Menlo Park, California, and the University of Southern California in Los Angeles via University College London, England, across three types of networks: packet radio, satellite, and the ARPANET. In 2007, the Computer History Museum presented a 30th-anniversary celebration of this demonstration, which included several participants from the 1977 event. SRI would go on to run the Network Information Center under the leadership of Elizabeth J. Feinler.

=== Split and diversification ===
The Vietnam War (1955–1975) was an important issue on college campuses across the United States in the 1960s and 1970s. As a belated response to Vietnam War protesters who believed that funding from the Defense Advanced Research Projects Agency (DARPA) made the university part of the military–industrial complex, the Stanford Research Institute split from Stanford University in 1970. The organization subsequently changed its name from the Stanford Research Institute to SRI International in 1977.

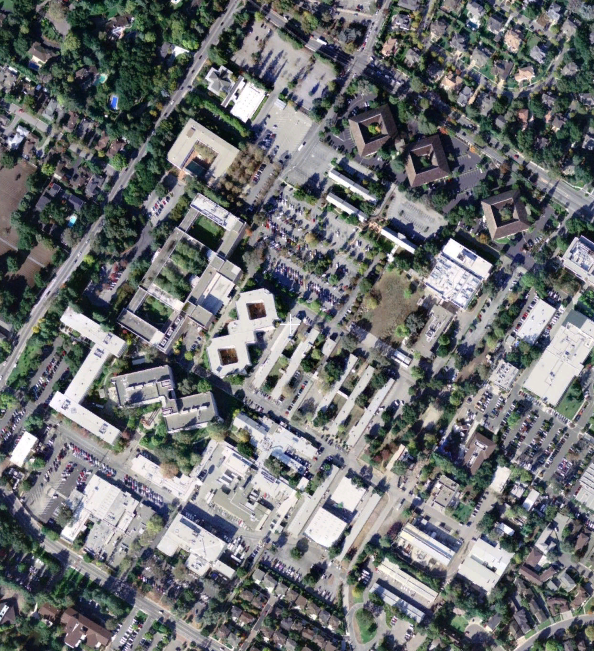
Aerial image of SRI's Menlo Park campus

In 1972, electrical engineer and parapsychologist Harold E. Puthoff and physicist Russell Targ undertook a series of investigations of psychic phenomena sponsored by the CIA, for which they coined the term remote viewing. Among other activities, the project encompassed the work of consulting "consciousness researchers" including artist/writer Ingo Swann, military intelligence officer Joseph McMoneagle, and psychic/illusionist Uri Geller. This ESP work continued with funding from the US intelligence community until Puthoff and Targ left SRI in the mid-1980s. For more information, see Parapsychology research at SRI.

Social scientist and consumer futurist Arnold Mitchell created the Values, Attitudes and Lifestyles (VALS) psychographic methodology in the late 1970s to explain changing U.S. values and lifestyles. VALS was formally inaugurated as an SRI product in 1978 and was called "one of the ten top market research breakthroughs of the 1980s" by Advertising Age magazine.

Throughout the 1980s, SRI developed Zylon, stealth technologies, improvements to ultrasound imaging, two-dimensional laser fluorescence imaging, and many-sorted logic. In computing and software, SRI developed a multimedia electronic mail system, a theory of non-interference in computer security, a multilevel secure (MLS) relational database system called Seaview, LaTeX, Open Agent Architecture (OAA), a network intrusion detection system, the Maude system, a declarative software language, and PacketHop, a peer-to-peer wireless technology to create scalable ad hoc networks. SRI's research in network intrusion detection led to the patent infringement case SRI International, Inc. v. Internet Security Systems, Inc. The AI center's robotics research led to Shakey's successor, Flakey the robot, which focused on fuzzy logic.

In 1986, SRI.com became the 8th registered ".com" domain. The Artificial Intelligence Center developed the Procedural Reasoning System (PRS) in the late 1980s and into the early 1990s. PRS launched the field of BDI-based intelligent agents. In the 1990s, SRI developed a letter sorting system for the United States Postal Service and several education and economic studies.

Military-related technologies developed by SRI in the 1990s and 2000s include ground- and foliage-penetrating radar, the INCON and REDDE command and control system for the U.S. military, and IGRS (integrated GPS radio system)—an advanced military personnel and vehicle tracking system. To train armored combat units during battle exercises, SRI developed the Deployable Force-on-Force Instrumented Range System (DFIRST), which uses GPS satellites, high-speed wireless communications, and digital terrain map displays.

SRI created the Centibots in 2003, one of the first and largest teams of coordinated, autonomous mobile robots that explore, map, and survey unknown environments. It also created BotHunter, a free utility for Unix, which detects botnet activity within a network.

The IraqComm system

With DARPA-funded research, SRI contributed to the development of speech recognition and translation products and was an active participant in DARPA's Global Autonomous Language Exploitation (GALE) program. SRI developed DynaSpeak speech recognition technology, which was used in the handheld VoxTec Phraselator, allowing U.S. soldiers overseas to communicate with local citizens in near real-time. SRI also created translation software for use in the IraqComm, a device which allows two-way, speech-to-speech machine translation between English and colloquial Iraqi Arabic.

In medicine and chemistry, SRI developed dry-powder drugs, laser photocoagulation (a treatment for some eye maladies), remote surgery (also known as telerobotic surgery), bio-agent detection using upconverting phosphor technology, the experimental anticancer drugs Tirapazamine and TAS-108, ammonium dinitramide (an environmentally benign oxidizer for safe and cost-effective disposal of hazardous materials), the electroactive polymer ("artificial muscle"), new uses for diamagnetic levitation, and the antimalarial drug Halofantrine.

SRI performed a study in the 1990s for Whirlpool Corporation that led to modern self-cleaning ovens. In the 2000s, SRI worked on Pathway Tools software for use in bioinformatics and systems biology to accelerate drug discovery using artificial intelligence and symbolic computing techniques. The software system generates the BioCyc database collection, SRI's growing collection of genomic databases used by biologists to visualize genes within a chromosome, complete biochemical pathways, and full metabolic maps of organisms.

=== Early 21st century ===
SRI researchers made the first observation of visible light emitted by oxygen atoms in the night-side airglow of Venus, offering new insight into the planet's atmosphere. SRI education researchers conducted the first national evaluation of the growing U.S. charter schools movement. For the World Golf Foundation, SRI compiled the first-ever estimate of the overall scope of the U.S. golf industry's goods and services ($62 billion in 2000), providing a framework for monitoring the long-term growth of the industry. In April 2000, SRI formed Atomic Tangerine, an independent consulting firm designed to bring new technologies and services to market.

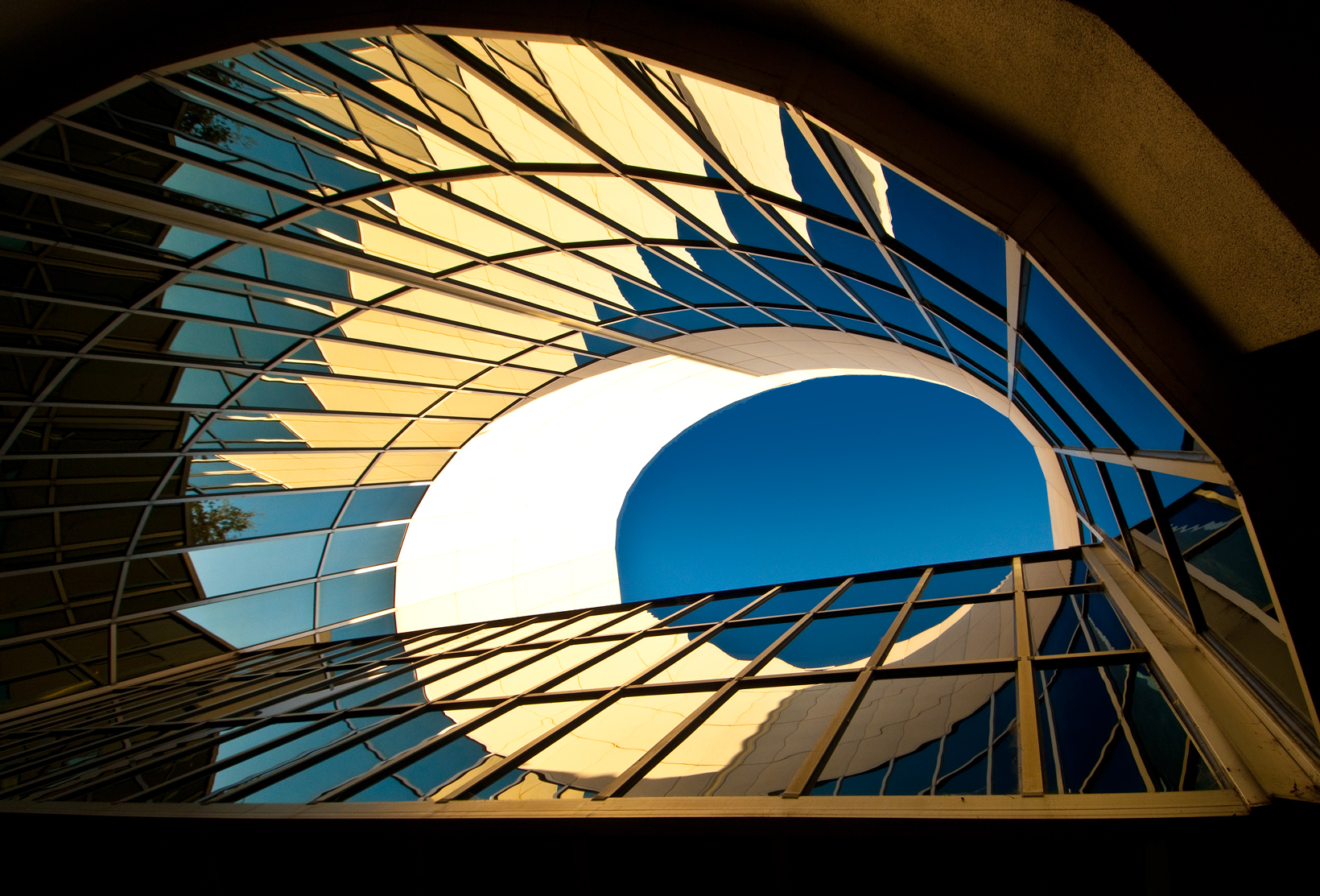
A building on SRI International's campus

In 2006, SRI was awarded a $56.9 million contract with the National Institute of Allergy and Infectious Diseases to provide preclinical services for the development of drugs and antibodies for anti-infective treatments for avian influenza, SARS, West Nile virus and hepatitis. Also in 2006, SRI selected St. Petersburg, Florida, as the site for a new marine technology research facility targeted at ocean science, the maritime industry and port security; the facility is a collaboration with the University of South Florida College of Marine Science and its Center for Ocean Technology. That facility created a new method for underwater mass spectrometry, which has been used to conduct "advanced underwater chemical surveys in oil and gas exploration and production, ocean resource monitoring and protection, and water treatment and management" and was licensed to Spyglass Technologies in March 2014.

In December 2007, SRI launched a spin-off company, Siri Inc., which Apple acquired in April 2010. In October 2011, Apple announced the Siri personal assistant as an integrated feature of the Apple iPhone 4S. Siri's technology was born from SRI's work on the DARPA-funded CALO project, described by SRI as the largest artificial intelligence project ever launched. Siri was co-founded in December 2007 by Dag Kittlaus (CEO), Adam Cheyer (vice president, engineering), and Tom Gruber (CTO/vice president, design), together with Norman Winarsky (vice president of SRI Ventures). Investors included Menlo Ventures and Morgenthaler Ventures.

For the National Science Foundation (NSF), SRI operates the advanced modular incoherent scatter radar (AMISR), a novel relocatable atmospheric research facility. Other SRI-operated research facilities for the NSF include the Arecibo Observatory in Puerto Rico and the Sondrestrom Upper Atmospheric Research Facility in Greenland. In May 2011, SRI was awarded a $42 million contract to operate the Arecibo Observatory from October 1, 2011, to September 30, 2016. The institute also manages the Hat Creek Radio Observatory in Northern California, home of the Allen Telescope Array.

In February 2014, SRI announced a "photonics-based testing technology called FASTcell" for the detection and characterization of rare circulating tumor cells from blood samples. The test is aimed at cancer-specific biomarkers for breast, lung, prostate, colorectal, and leukemia cancers that circulate in the bloodstream in minute quantities, potentially diagnosing those conditions earlier.

In September 2018, the NSF announced that SRI International would be awarded $4.4 million to establish the backbone organization of a national network.

In April 2023, Xerox announced that it would donate PARC and its related assets to SRI. As part of the deal, Xerox would keep most of the patent rights inside PARC, and benefit from a preferred research agreement with SRI/PARC.

== Description ==
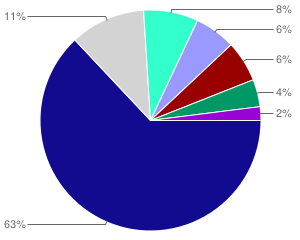
SRI awards by source Department of Defense (63%) National Institutes of Health (11%) Business and industry (8%) US State and Local (6%) US National Science Foundation (6%) US Department of Education (4%) Foundations (2%)

=== Employees and financials ===
As of February 2015, SRI employs approximately 2,100 people. In 2014, SRI had about $540 million in revenue. In 2013, the United States Department of Defense consisted of 63% of awards by value; the remainder was composed of the National Institutes of Health (11%); businesses and industry (8%); other United States agencies (6%); the National Science Foundation (6%); the United States Department of Education (4%); and foundations (2%).

As of February 2015, approximately 4,000 patents have been granted to SRI International and its employees.

=== Facilities ===
SRI is primarily based on a 63-acre (0.25 km^{2}; 0.10 sq mi) campus located in Menlo Park, California, which is considered part of Silicon Valley. This campus encompasses 1,300,000 square feet (120,000 m^{2}) of office and lab space. In addition, SRI has a 254-acre (1.028 km^{2}; 0.397 sq mi) campus in Princeton, New Jersey, with 600,000 square feet (56,000 m^{2}) of research space. There are also offices in Washington, D.C., and Tokyo, Japan. In total, SRI has 2,300,000 square feet (210,000 m^{2}) of office and laboratory space.

=== Organization ===
SRI International is organized into seven units (generally called divisions) focusing on specific subject areas.

Name	Research area	Ref.
Advanced Technology and Systems	SRI's largest organizational unit manages complex projects for government and commercial clients in areas such as chemistry, physics, and materials science; geospace studies and space and marine technology; surveillance and remote sensing; applied optics and secure circuits; and robotics, medical devices, and nanotechnology.	
Biosciences	SRI Biosciences works with academic, commercial, foundation, and government clients and partners to bring new medicines to market through basic research, pharmaceutical discovery, preclinical development, and clinical translation. SRI has helped move more than 100 drugs into clinical trials.	
Education	SRI Education works with government officials, private foundations, and commercial clients to provide research-based analysis and evaluation of programs to identify trends, understand outcomes, and guide public policy and practice. Focus areas include early learning, educational technology, social and emotional learning, teacher quality assessments, college and career readiness, and large-scale surveys.	
Global Partnerships	It comprises three groups: the Center for Science, Technology, and Economic Development, the Center for Innovation Leadership, the Energy Center, and a team focused on R&D programs for international clients.	
Information and Computing Sciences	For its government and commercial clients, this division conducts R&D activities to understand the computational principles underlying human and machine intelligence and create computer-based systems that solve problems. ICS is organized into four laboratories, one of which is SRI's Artificial Intelligence Center. The division focuses on artificial intelligence, speech recognition, natural language processing, bioinformatics, and computer security.	
Mission Solutions	Mission Solutions performs technology and services in support U.S. government-deployed systems. The division focuses on information operations, navigation, and survivability systems and systems and signal technology.	
Products and Solutions	This SRI division transitions R&D technology into products for its government and commercial clients. It maintains a portfolio that includes biometric identification systems, real-time video processing systems, integrated video and sensor exploitation solutions, and video test tools.	

== Staff members and alumni ==
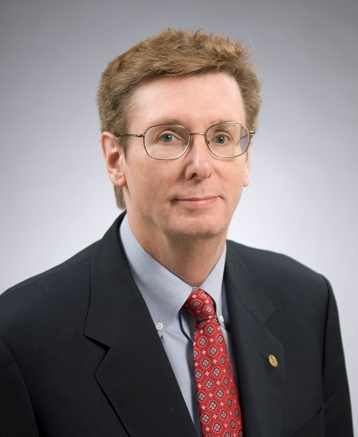
Curtis Carlson

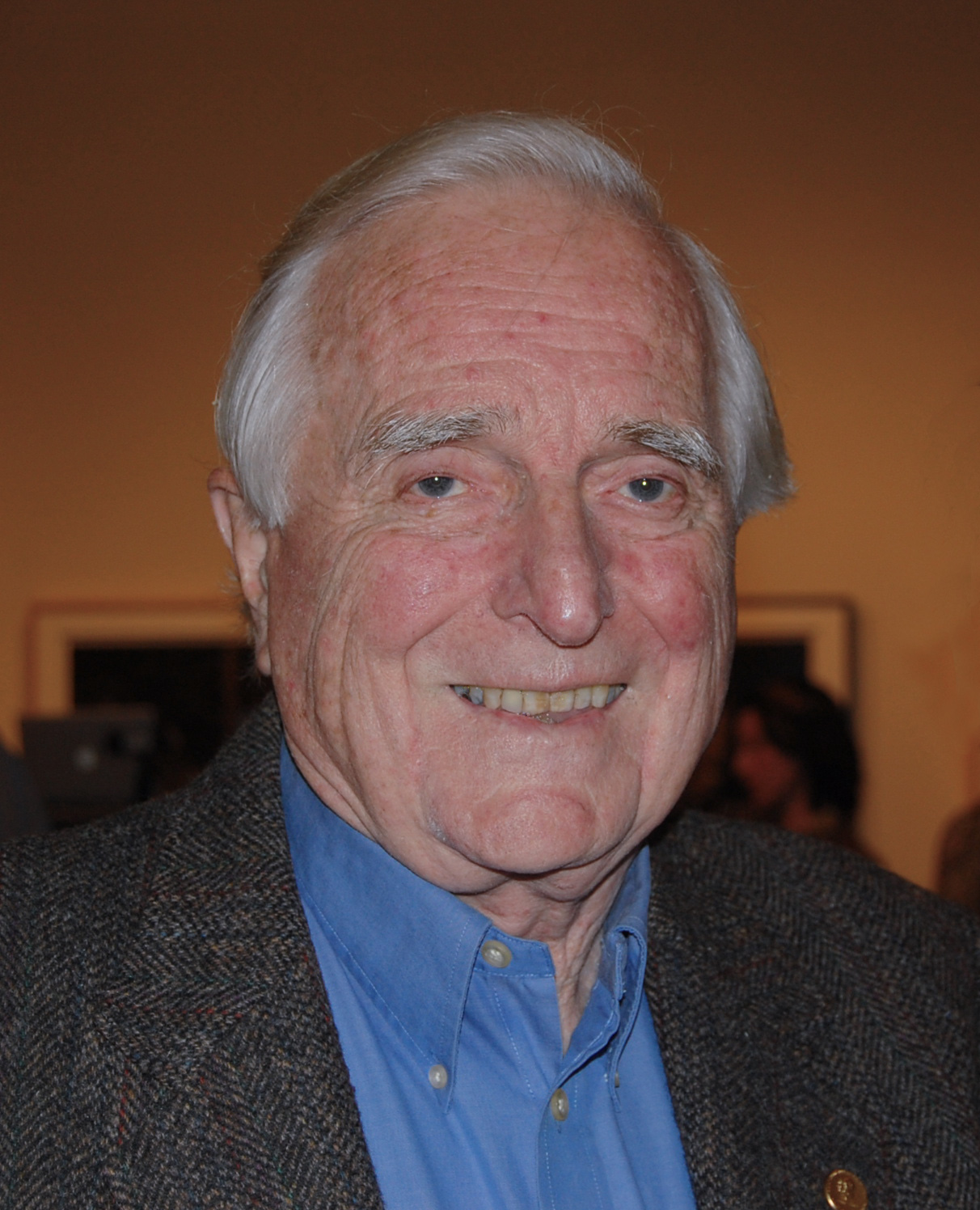
Douglas Engelbart

SRI has had a chief executive of some form since its establishment. Before the split with Stanford University, the position was known as the director; after the split, it is known as the company's president and CEO. SRI has had nine so far, including William F. Talbot (1946–1947), Jesse E. Hobson (1947–1955), E. Finley Carter (1956–1963), Charles Anderson (1968–1979), William F. Miller (1979–1990), James J. Tietjen (1990–1993), William P. Sommers (1993–1998) Curtis Carlson (1998–2014). More recently, the role was split into two. The current CEO is David Parekh and the president is Manish Kothari (formerly president of SRI Ventures).

SRI also has had a board of directors since its inception, which has both guided and provided opportunities for the organization. The current board of directors includes Samuel Armacost (Chairman of the Board Emeritus), Mariann Byerwalter (chairman), William A. Jeffrey, Charles A. Holloway (vice-chairman), Vern Clark, Robert L. Joss, Leslie F. Kenne, Henry Kressel, David Liddle, Philip J. Quigley, Wendell Wierenga and John J. Young Jr.

Its notable researchers include Elmer Robinson (meteorologist), co-author of the 1968 SRI report to the American Petroleum Institute (API) on the risks of fossil fuel burning to the global climate. Many notable researchers were involved with the Augmentation Research Center. These include Douglas Engelbart, the developer of the modern GUI; William English, the inventor of the mouse; Jeff Rulifson, the primary developer of the NLS; Elizabeth J. Feinler, who ran the Network Information Center; and David Maynard, who would help found Electronic Arts.

The Artificial Intelligence Center has also produced a large number of notable alumni, many of whom contributed to Shakey the robot; these include project manager Charles Rosen, as well as Nils Nilsson, Bertram Raphael, Richard O. Duda, Peter E. Hart, Richard Fikes, and Richard Waldinger. AI researcher Gary Hendrix went on to found Symantec. Former Yahoo! President and CEO Marissa Mayer performed a research internship at the Center in the 1990s. The CALO project (and its spin-off, Siri) also produced notable names including C. Raymond Perrault and Adam Cheyer.

Several SRI projects produced notable researchers and engineers long before computing was mainstream. Early employee Paul M. Cook founded Raychem. William K. MacCurdy developed the Hydra-Cushion freight car for Southern Pacific in 1954; Hewitt Crane and Jerre Noe were instrumental in the development of Electronic Recording Machine, Accounting; Harrison Price helped The Walt Disney Company design Disneyland; James C. Bliss developed the Optacon; and Robert Weitbrecht invented the first telecommunications device for the deaf.

== Spin-off companies ==
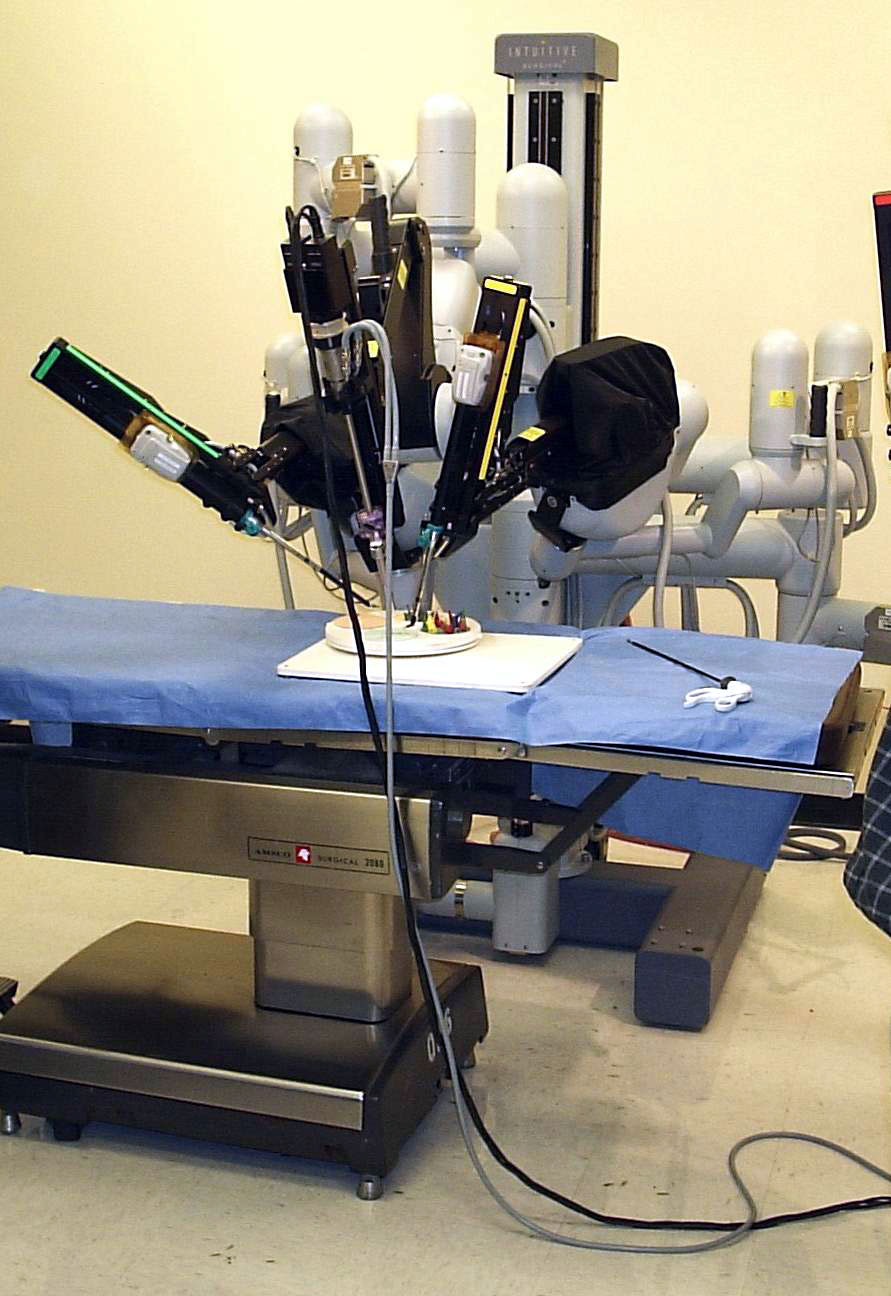
Intuitive Surgical's robotic surgery system, the da Vinci Surgical System

Working with investment and venture capital firms, SRI and its former employees have launched more than 60 spin-off ventures in a wide range of fields, including Siri (acquired by Apple), Tempo AI (acquired by Salesforce.com), Redwood Robotics (acquired by Google), Desti (acquired by HERE), Grabit, Kasisto, Passio, Artificial Muscle, Inc. (acquired by Bayer MaterialScience), Nuance Communications, Intuitive Surgical, Ravenswood Solutions, and Orchid Cellmark.

Some former SRI staff members have also established new companies. In engineering and analysis, for example, notable companies formed by SRI alums include Weitbrecht Communications, Exponent and Raychem. Companies in the area of legal, policy and business analysis include Fair Isaac Corporation, Global Business Network and Institute for the Future.

Research in computing and computer science-related areas led to the development of many companies, including Symantec, the Australian Artificial Intelligence Institute, E-Trade, and Verbatim Corporation. Wireless technologies spawned Firetide and venture capital firm enVia Partners. Health systems research inspired Telesensory Systems.

== See also ==
- List of R&D laboratories
- The Mother of All Demos
