= List of SRI International people =

Notable people from Stanford Research Institute

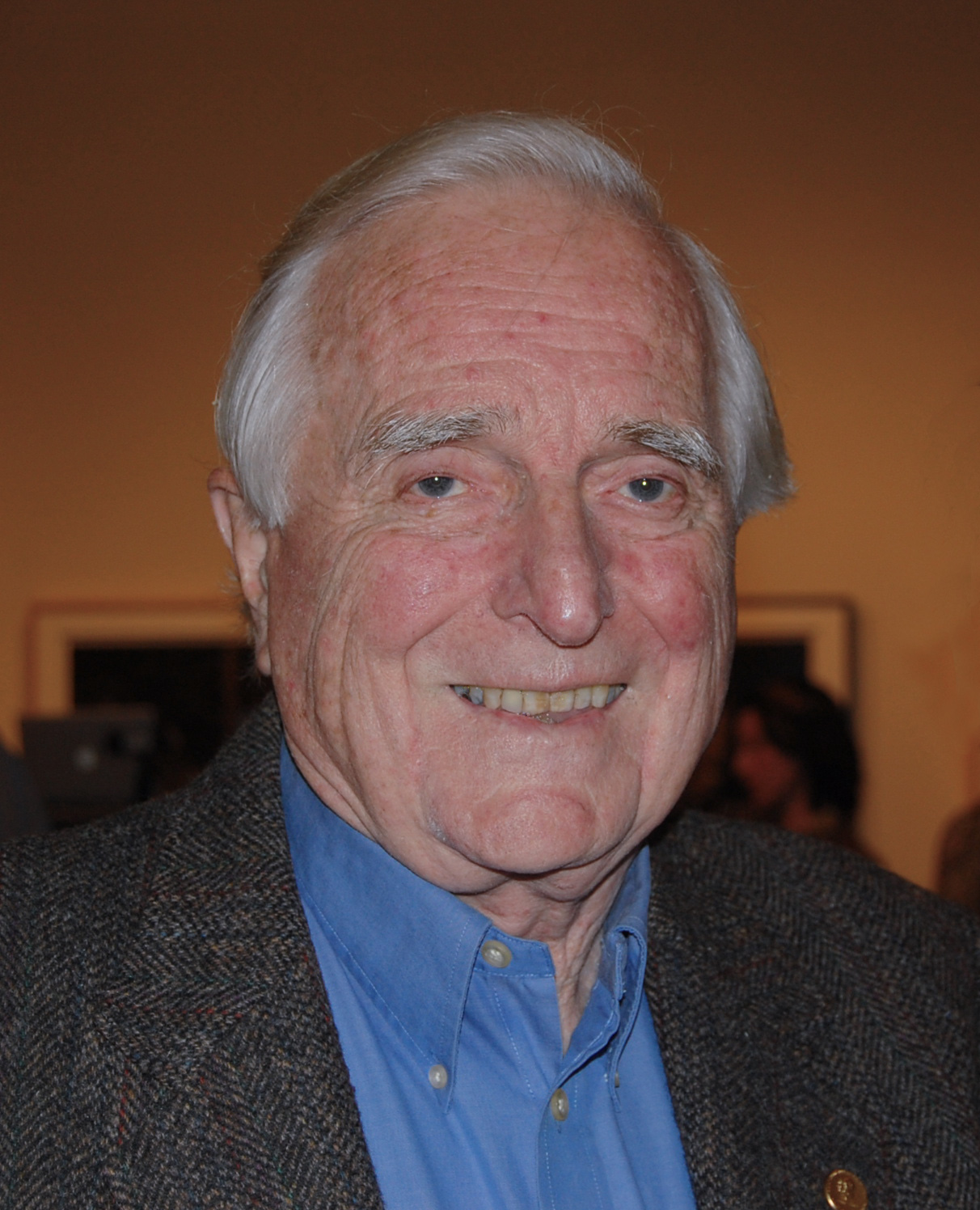
Douglas Engelbart, SRI's most famous alumnus, invented many features of modern computers through SRI's Augmentation Research Center.

SRI International (SRI), originally known as the Stanford Research Institute, is one of the world's largest contract research institutes. SRI, based in Menlo Park, California, was established by the trustees of Stanford University in 1946 as a center of innovation to support economic development in the region. In 1970, SRI formally separated from Stanford University and, in 1977, became known as SRI International. The separation was a belated response to Vietnam war protesters at Stanford University who believed that SRI's Defense Advanced Research Projects Agency (DARPA)-funded work was essentially making the university part of the military–industrial complex. Sarnoff Corporation, a wholly owned subsidiary of SRI since 1988, was fully integrated into SRI in January 2011.

SRI's focus areas include telecommunication, computing, economic development and science and technology policy, education, energy and the environment, engineering systems, pharmaceuticals and health sciences, homeland security and national defense, materials and structures, video processing, computer vision, and robotics. SRI currently employs about 2500 people, and has an alumni association.

SRI has had a chief executive of some form since its establishment. Prior to the split with Stanford University, the position was known as the director; after the split, it is known as the company's president and CEO. SRI has had nine so far, including William F. Talbot (1946–1947), Jesse E. Hobson (1947–1955), E. Finley Carter (1956–1963), Charles Anderson (1968–1979), William F. Miller (1979–1990), James J. Tietjen (1990–1993), William P. Sommers (1993–1998), Curtis Carlson (1998–2014), and most recently, William A. Jeffrey (2014–present). SRI also has had a board of directors since its inception, which has served to both guide and provide opportunities for the organization. The current board of directors includes Marianne Byerwalter (chairman), Charles A. Holloway (vice chairman), Samuel Armacost, Vern Clark, William A. Jeffrey (current SRI president and CEO), Robert L. Joss, Leslie F. Kenne, Henry Kressel, David Liddle, Philip J. Quigley, Wendell Wierenga, and John J. Young, Jr.

Many notable SRI researchers were involved with the Augmentation Research Center. These include Principal Investigator Douglas Engelbart, the developer of the modern GUI; William English, who contributed to the design of Engelbart's computer mouse; Jeff Rulifson, the primary software architect of the NLS; Elizabeth J. Feinler, who ran the Network Information Center; and David Maynard, who would help found Electronic Arts. The Artificial Intelligence Center has also produced many notable alumni, many of whom contributed to Shakey the robot; these include project manager Charles Rosen as well as Nils Nilsson, Bertram Raphael, Richard O. Duda, Peter E. Hart, Richard Fikes and Richard Waldinger. Artificial intelligence researcher Gary Hendrix went on to found Symantec. The CALO project (and its spin-off, Siri) also produced notable names including C. Raymond Perrault and Adam Cheyer.

Several SRI projects produced notable researchers and engineers long before computing was mainstream. William K. MacCurdy developed the Hydra-Cushion freight car for Southern Pacific in 1954; Hewitt Crane and Jerre Noe were instrumental in the development of Electronic Recording Machine, Accounting; Harrison Price helped The Walt Disney Company design Disneyland; James C. Bliss developed the Optacon; and Robert Weitbrecht invented the first telecommunications device for the deaf.

== A ==
Name	Notability	References
Thomas J. Ahrens	Head of the Geophysics Section of the Poulter Laboratory from 1962 to 1967.	
Charles Anderson	SRI's President and CEO from 1968 to 1980	
Samuel Armacost	Business executive who was formerly the president, director, and CEO of BankAmerica Corporation. He has chaired or served on the boards of directors of several major organizations, and has been on SRI's board since 1981; he was also SRI's chairman from 1998 to 2010.	

== B ==
Name	Notability	References
William B. Bader	Vice President and Senior Officer of SRI's Washington, D.C. office from 1981–1988; Vice President of SRI's policy division from 1998 to 1992.	
Charles Alden Black	SRI Executive in the 1950s known for aquaculture and oceanography, and for his marriage to Shirley Temple Black.	
James C. Bliss	Electrical engineer and entrepreneur best known for his pioneering role in developing technological aids for visually impaired people, including the Optacon.	
H. Dean Brown	Worked at SRI from 1967 to 1976 and was head of the Systems Development Group, Information Science and Engineering Division. He specialized in computer-aided instruction, man-machine studies, educational policy and planning, and nuclear reactor physics. He was also a member of Willis Harman's Futures Research Program.	
Mariann Byerwalter	Member of the board of directors of several companies. Was previously the chief financial officer and vice president for business affairs for Stanford University. She has been on SRI's board of directors since 1998 and was named its chairman in 2014.	

== C ==
Name	Notability	References
Curtis Carlson	CEO and President of SRI from 1998 to 2014, former member of SRI's board of directors. Carlson was awarded Worcester Polytechnic Institute's Robert H. Goddard Alumni Award in 2002 and the Society for Information Display's Otto H. Schade Award in 2006.	
E. Finley Carter	SRI's third Director from 1955 to 1966. Was a 1949 IEEE Fellow.	
Adam Cheyer	Co-founder of Siri and was a director of engineering in the iPhone group at Apple. Prior to Siri, he was a computer scientist and project director in SRI's Artificial Intelligence Center, where he was the Chief Architect on the CALO project.	
Vern Clark	Formerly Chief of Naval Operations in the United States Navy, he has been on SRI's board of directors since 2007, and was its chairman from 2010 to 2014.	
Mark A. Clifton	Has been SRI's vice president for products and services since February 2008. He was also CEO and president of the SRI-owned Sarnoff Corporation from October 2009 until its absorption in January 2011.	
Don Cone	Technician and researcher who developed and ran the Packet Radio Van that was used in the first ARPANET internetworked transmission.	
Paul M. Cook	Radiochemist who founded Raychem and was awarded the National Medal of Technology.	
Tom N. Cornsweet	In the late 1960s and early 1970s, he designed or co-designed several instruments for measuring properties of the eye, including eyetrackers, auto-refractors, and optical fundus scanners.	
Hewitt Crane	Engineer known for work at SRI on ERMA (Electronic Recording Machine, Accounting), magnetic digital logic, neuristor logic, the development of an eye-movement tracking device, and the creation of a pen-input device for computers. He was named an IEEE Fellow in 1968.	

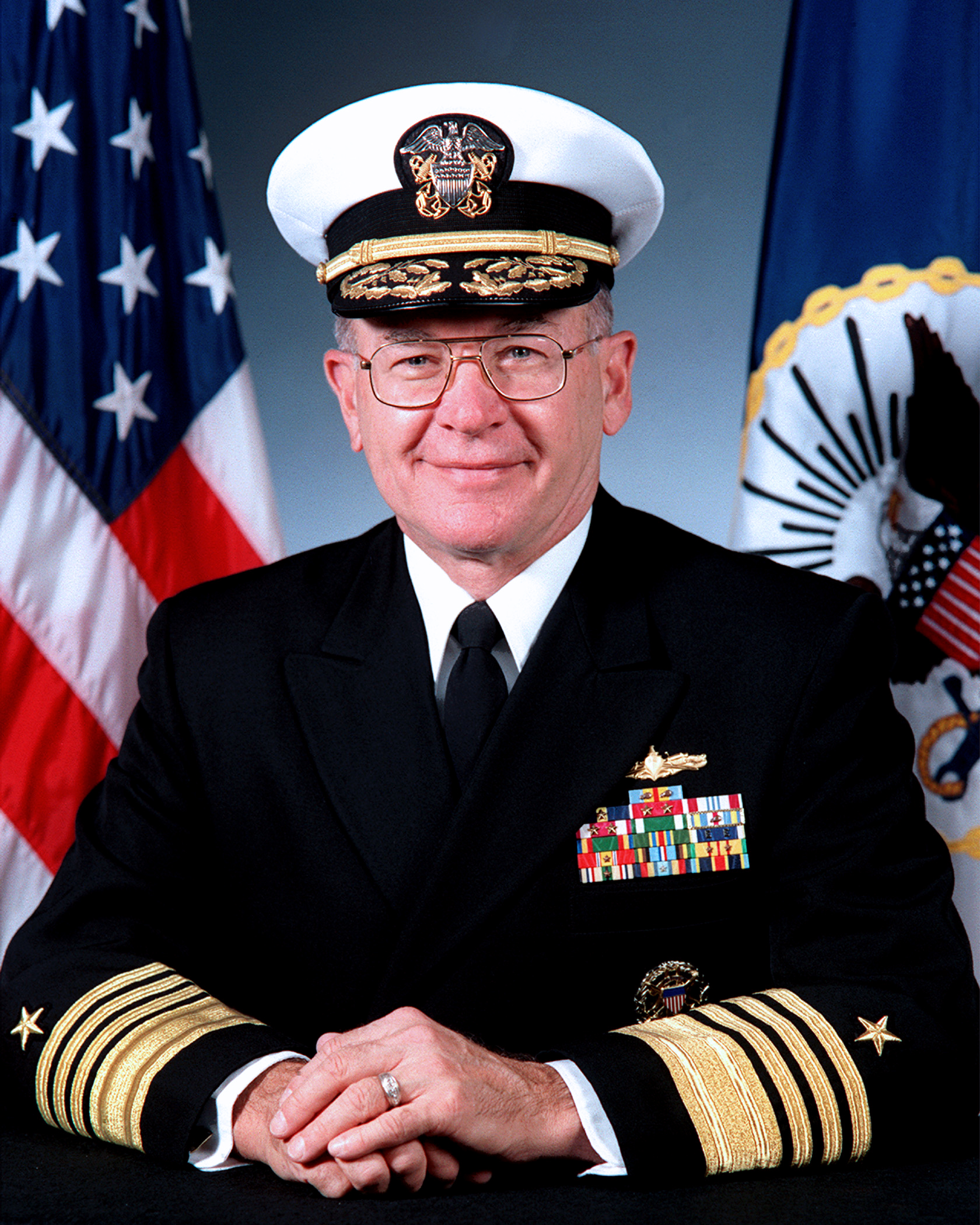
Vern Clark, Chairman of SRI's board of directors from 2010-2014.

== D ==
Name / Notability / References; Richard O. Duda / Professor Emeritus of Electrical Engineering at San Jose State University renowned for his work on sound localization and pattern recognition. While at SRI, Duda and Peter E. Hart were the authors of "Pattern Classification and Scene Analysis", originally published in 1973. This classic text is a widely cited reference. He is an IEEE Fellow and AAAI Fellow.

== E ==
Name	Notability	References
William Alden Edson	Electrical engineer and IEEE Fellow who worked at SRI from the mid-1970s until his retirement in 1986, and part time until April 2006.	
Douglas Engelbart	Engelbart recruited a research team in his new Augmentation Research Center, and became the driving force behind the design and development of the On-Line System, or NLS. He and his team developed computer-interface elements such as bit-mapped screens, the mouse, hypertext, collaborative tools, and precursors to the graphical user interface. Engelbart showcased the chorded keyboard and many more of his and ARC's inventions in 1968 at the so-called mother of all demos. Engelbart was awarded the National Medal of Technology.	
William English	Computer engineer who contributed to the development of the computer mouse while working for Douglas Engelbart at SRI's Augmentation Research Center.	
Alvin C. Eurich	Helped organize SRI and served as its chairman.	

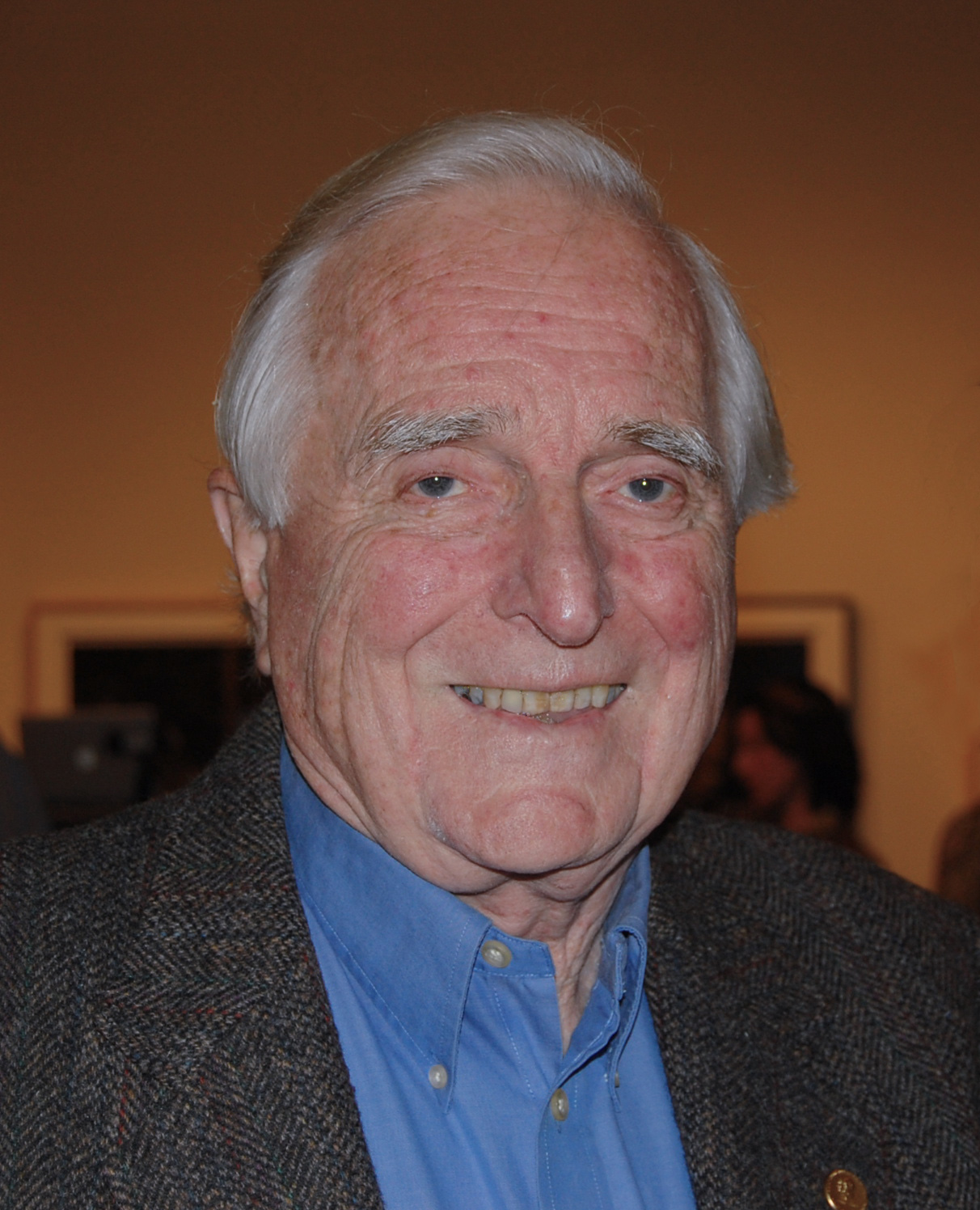
Douglas Engelbart, known for innovations in the NLS and The Mother of All Demos.

== F ==
Name	Notability	References
Elizabeth J. Feinler	From 1972 until 1989 she was director of SRI's Network Information Systems Center. Her group operated the Network Information Center (NIC) for the ARPANET as it evolved into the Defense Data Network (DDN) and the Internet.	
Richard Fikes	Contributed to the Shakey the Robot project, including the development of the STRIPS algorithm.	
Thomas J. Furst	Furst has been SRI's senior vice president and chief financial officer since 1996. He was the director of Sarnoff Corporation until its absorption in January 2011.	

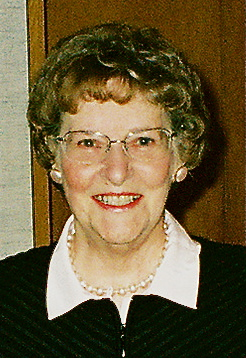
Elizabeth J. Feinler

== G ==
Name	Notability	References
Michael Georgeff	Former program director at SRI's Artificial Intelligence Center and later director of the Australian Artificial Intelligence Institute.	
Weldon B. Gibson	Longtime executive at SRI, where he worked full-time from 1947 until 1988, and part time as Senior Director Emeritus until his death in 2001. He was closely associated with the organization, and was known as "Mr. SRI".	

== H ==
Name	Notability	References
Willis Harman	Senior social scientist at SRI that started a futures research program, exploring the national and global future. He worked on long-term strategic planning and policy analysis for an assortment of corporations, government agencies, and international organizations.	
Peter E. Hart	While at SRI's Artificial Intelligence Center, Hart co-authored 20 papers, among them the initial exposition of the A* search algorithm and the variant of the Hough transform now widely used in computer vision for finding straight line segments in images. He also contributed to the development of Shakey the Robot.	
Gary Hendrix	Natural language analyst who founded Symantec, an international corporation which sells computer software, particularly in the fields of information management and antivirus software. He started at SRI's Artificial Intelligence Center after publishing a paper about Shakey the Robot while working on his Ph.D. at the University of Texas.	
Jerry Hobbs	From 1977 to 2002 he was with SRI's Artificial Intelligence Center, where he was a principal scientist and program director of the Natural Language Program. He has written numerous papers in the areas of parsing, syntax, semantic interpretation, information extraction, knowledge representation, encoding commonsense knowledge, discourse analysis, the structure of conversation, and the Semantic Web.	
Charles A. Holloway	Has been a professor at Stanford University's Graduate School of Business since 1968 and has been a member of SRI's board of directors since 2003.	
Jesse E. Hobson	SRI's second Director from 1947 to 1955	
Albert S. Humphrey	Business and management consultant	

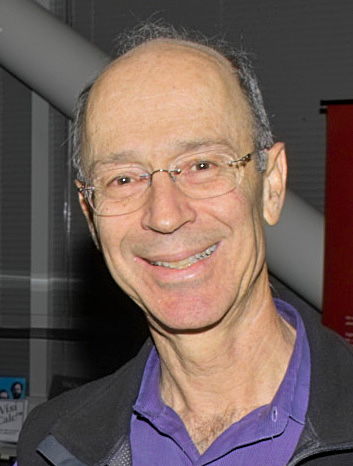
Peter E. Hart, who developed the A* search algorithm.

== I ==
Name / Notability / References; Charles Irby / Chief software architect on SRI's oN-Line System (NLS) that was used in The Mother of All Demos, which established many of the user interface standards that exist today. He was later a lead designer on the Xerox Star and the Nintendo 64.

== K ==
Name	Notability	References
Leslie P. Kaelbling	MIT professor recognized for adapting partially observable Markov decision process from operations research for application in artificial intelligence and robotics. Founding editor of the Journal of Machine Learning Research. 1997 IJCAI Computers and Thought Award recipient.	
Leslie F. Kenne	Leslie F. Kenne is a retired Lieutenant General in the United States Air Force, and has been on SRI's board since 2008.	
Thomas Kilduff	Neuroscientist that focuses on sleep research; discovered sleep-related neuropeptide hypocretin. Named AAAS Fellow in 2009.	
Henry Kressel	Partner and the senior managing director of the private equity firm Warburg Pincus. He has been a board member of SRI International since 2001.	
Michael Kudlick	Developed the file transfer (FTP) and mail (email) protocols for ARPANET while working at the Augmentation Research Center.	

== L ==
Name	Notability	References
Leslie Lamport	Noted computer scientist who developed LaTeX. While at SRI from 1977 to 1985, he focused on concurrent computing, sequential consistency and distributed computing. This period included at least three of his highly cited works; these include "Time, Clocks, and the Ordering of Events in a Distributed System", "How to Make a Multiprocessor Computer That Correctly Executes Multiprocess Programs" and "The Byzantine Generals' Problem".	
David Liddle	Co-founder of Interval Research Corporation, consulting professor of computer science at Stanford University, and credited with heading development of the Xerox Star computer system. He has been on SRI's board of directors since January 2012.	

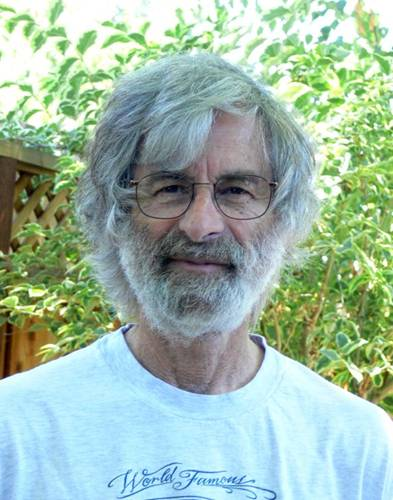
Leslie Lamport, developer of LaTeX.

== M ==
Name	Notability	References
William K. MacCurdy	Developed the Hydra-Cushion freight car for Southern Pacific in 1954; cushioned rail cars are still the standard today.	
William Mark	Senior Technology Advisor, Commercialization; former Vice president of SRI and head of their Information and Computing Sciences Division; he was also a principal investigator of the CALO project.	
David Maynard	Worked on Engelbart's team that produced The Mother of All Demos while at SRI. He would later become a founding member of Electronic Arts.	
Frank R. Mayo	Research chemist who won the 1967 Award in Polymer Chemistry from the American Chemical Society due to his work on the Mayo–Lewis equation.	
Michael McKubre	Electro-chemist in the forefront of cold fusion energy development.	
William F. Miller	SRI's President and CEO from 1979 to 1990	
Arnold Mitchell	Social scientist who created the psychographic methodology, Values, Attitudes and Lifestyles (VALS).	
Thomas H. Morrin	Morrin was the first member and director of SRI's Engineering Group from 1948 to 1963. He played a key role in bringing many notable projects to SRI, including Electronic Recording Machine, Accounting; a large contract with the United States Army dedicated to continuous, broad technical support, the Combat Development Experimentation Center (CDEC); and a few projects from Southern Pacific, including William K. MacCurdy's Hydra-Cushion.	
Kristien Mortelmans	Senior microbiologist emeritus at SRI International's Biosciences Center for Immunology and Infectious Diseases; noted for her contributions to the Ames test and applications thereof; also studies the biodegradation of explosives, the study of antibiotic resistance, and industrial microbiology (developing plastics and fuels).	
Karen Myers	Vice President, Information and Computing Sciences and Lab Director, Artificial Intelligence Center; noted for her research in automated planning and scheduling, autonomy, personalization technologies, mixed-initiative problem solving, and multi-agent systems.	

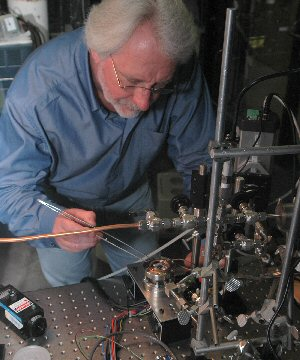
Michael McKubre working on a deuterium gas-based cold fusion cell.

== N ==
Name	Notability	References
Peter G. Neumann	Computer science researcher who has worked at SRI since 1971. He edits the RISKS Digest columns for ACM Software Engineering Notes and Communications of the ACM. He founded ACM SIGSOFT and is a Fellow of the ACM, IEEE and AAAS.	
Nils Nilsson	Nilsson, along with Charles A. Rosen and Bertram Raphael, led a research team in the construction of Shakey the Robot, resulting in the A* search algorithm and the field of automated planning and scheduling.	
Jerre Noe	Computer scientist and assistant director of engineering who led the technical team for the Electronic Recording Machine, Accounting project, Bank of America's first foray into computerized banking.	

== P ==
Name	Notability	References
C. Raymond Perrault	Artificial intelligence researcher and the director of the Artificial Intelligence Center at SRI As of 2012. He was a co-principal investigator of the CALO project, which is the predecessor for several AI technologies including Siri.	
Donn B. Parker	Worked at SRI for 30 years in information and computer security, and was named an ACM Fellow in 2008.	
Thomas Poulter	Arctic explorer and biological researcher.	
Harrison Price	Research economist specializing in how people spend their leisure time and resources. Price guided Walt Disney in the siting and development of Disneyland in Southern California and of Walt Disney World in Central Florida.	

== Q ==
Name / Notability / References; Philip J. Quigley / Retired chief executive officer of Pacific Telesis Corporation and a current director of Wells Fargo & Company. He has been on SRI's board of directors since 1998.

== R ==
Name	Notability	References
Bertram Raphael	Computer scientist known for his contributions to artificial intelligence, including the development of the A* search algorithm, the creation of Shakey the Robot, and the co-founding of the Journal of Artificial Intelligence.	
Elizabeth Rauscher	From 1974 to 1978, she was a researcher at SRI's Radio Physics Laboratory. She founded the Fundamental Fysiks Group in May 1975.	
Charles Rosen	Worked at SRI from 1957 to 1978, where he founded the Artificial Intelligence Center and was a key contributor to Shakey the Robot.	
Jeff Rulifson	Computer scientist that led the team that developed the oN-Line System (NLS) at the Augmentation Research Center, and was later involved in the creation of ARPANET.	
John Rushby	Computer scientist that has worked for SRI since 1983; he developed the Prototype Verification System theorem prover.	
Donald J. Russell	Executive at Southern Pacific and long-time member of both Stanford's Board of Trustees and SRI's Board of Directors who brought transportation business to SRI, starting with the Hydra-Cushion freight car.	

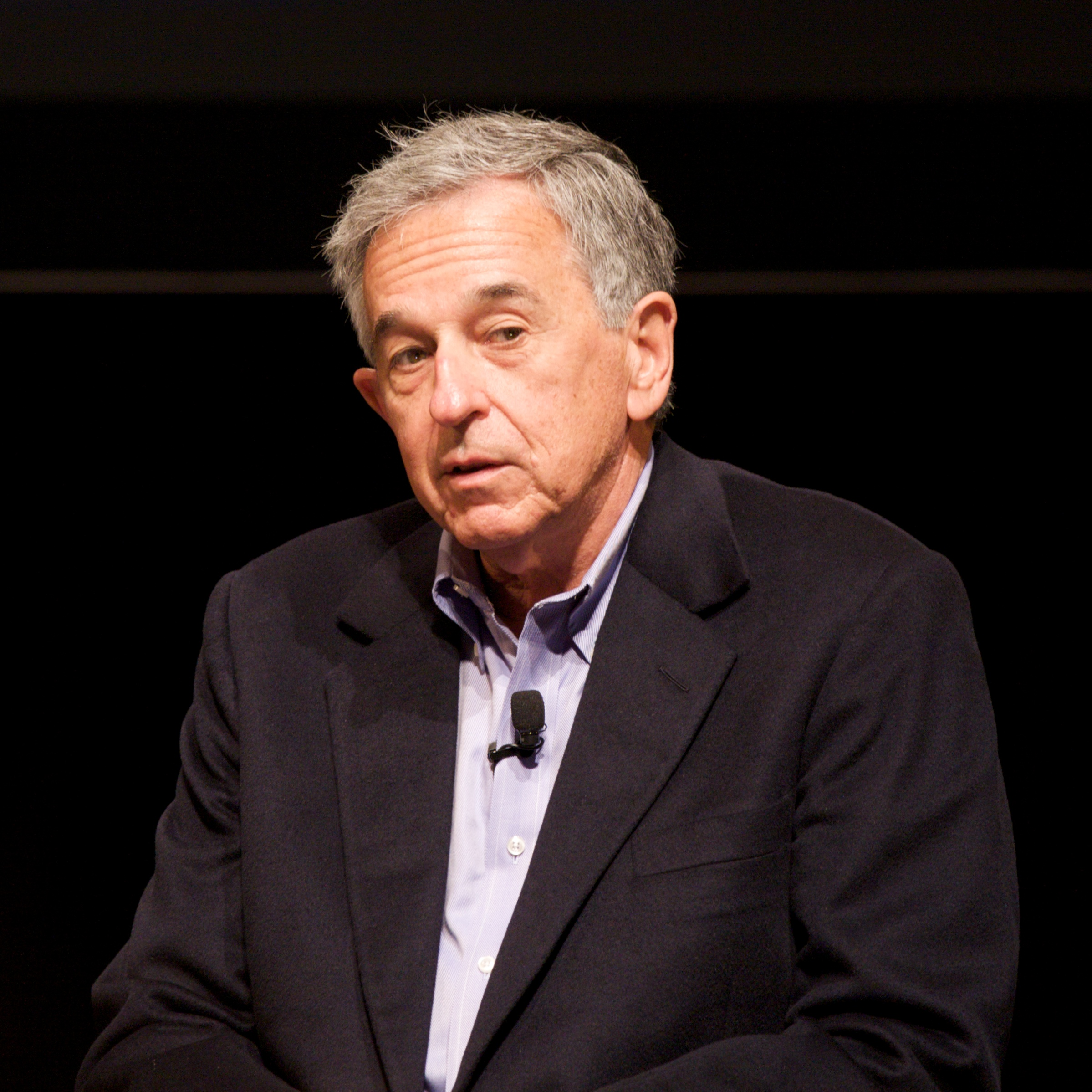
Jeff Rulifson led the team that developed the oN-Line System.

== S ==
Name	Notability	References
Peter Schwartz	Worked at SRI as a futurist from 1972 to 1982, where he specialized in scenario planning. He was eventually director of the Strategic Environment Center.	
Natarajan Shankar	Has worked at SRI's Computer Science Laboratory since 1989, and specializes in the fields of mathematics and logic, and has contributed extensively to the Prototype Verification System. He was named a SRI Fellow in 2009.	
William P. Sommers	SRI's President and CEO from 1993 to 1998	
Robert E. Swain	Swain was a strong proponent of the establishment of a research institute at Stanford University, which would eventually become SRI International.	

== T ==
Name	Notability	References
William F. Talbot	SRI's first Director from 1946 to 1947	
Jay Martin Tenenbaum	E-commerce pioneer, founder of CommerceNet	
James J. Tietjen	SRI's President and CEO from 1990 to 1993	
Donald Tresidder	Was Stanford University's president during the establishment of SRI International, and was instrumental in its founding. He strongly desired that the new organization accept contracts from private industry and not government organizations, and fired director William F. Talbot when he did not adhere to this vision.	

== V ==
Name	Notability	References
John van Geen	Advanced the acoustically coupled modem in 1966 to the point where it was viable to use over a telephone line.	
Oswald Garrison Villard, Jr.	In 1969, when Stanford University ceased classified work due to student protests, Villard moved his group to SRI, where he developed stealth technologies to counteract radar and sonar. In the 1980s, he developed small antennas that could receive jammed transmissions, allowing many people to receive the Voice of America radio program, especially after the Tiananmen Square protests of 1989.	

== W ==
Name	Notability	References
Richard Waldinger	Artificial intelligence researcher that has worked in SRI's Artificial Intelligence Center since 1969. He has contributed to Shakey the robot, program synthesis, and the SNARK theorem prover. He is a fellow of the Association for the Advancement of Artificial Intelligence.	
David H. D. Warren	Computer scientist that worked at the Artificial Intelligence Center in the 1970s and 1980s, particularly on the programming language Prolog; Warren wrote the first compiler for Prolog, and the Warren Abstract Machine execution environment for Prolog is named after him.	
Robert Weitbrecht	Engineer at SRI and later the spin-off company Weitbrecht Communications who invented the teleprinter and the modem (a form of acoustic coupler).	
Norman Winarsky	Has been vice president of SRI Ventures since 2001. Co-founder and board member of Siri.	

== X-Z ==
Name / Notability / References; John J. Young, Jr. / United States Assistant Secretary of the Navy (Research, Development and Acquisitions) from 2001 to 2005 and Under Secretary of Defense for Acquisition, Technology and Logistics from 2007 to 2009. He has been on SRI's board of directors since September 2009.

== See also ==
- List of SRI International spin-offs
