= List of SRI International spin-offs =

This is a list of spin-offs from SRI International. SRI International (SRI), previously known as Stanford Research Institute, is a research and innovation center. To commercialize its innovative technologies, SRI engages in licensing agreements and collaborates with investment and venture capital companies to initiate a diverse range of business ventures. SRI has launched more than 60 spin-off ventures; this includes four public companies with combined market capitalizations exceeding $20 billion.

== Engineering and systems ==
| Name | Notability | References |
|---|---|---|
| Applied Communications | Founded around 1967 by Robert Weitbrecht. Created early modems for the deaf community. The company is now known as Weitbrecht Communications. | |
| American Microsystems | Designed and manufactured integrated circuits and semiconductors. Purchased by Gould in 1982 and now known as AMI Semiconductor, which was purchased by ON Semiconductor. | |
| Anderson-Jacobson | First major producer of acoustically coupled modems. Acquired by CXR Telecom in 1988, which changed its name to Microtel International. | |
| Averatek | Formed by SRI and CSL LLC, offers products manufactured by a proprietary metal "print and plate" process used to make flexible circuit materials and components. | |
| Confidencial | Established in 2022 to secure sensitive information and collaboration for enterprises. | |
| Develco | Created general electronics systems. | |
| Electro-Optical Systems | Initially established in 1955. Worked on electrooptical shutter, aerial cameras and ion propulsion. Became Xerox Electro-Optical in 1967 and subsequently sold to Loral. | |
| Evergreen Engineering | Product development, including medical instrumentation. Established in 1977 by Steve Johnson and George Eilers. | |
| Failure Analysis Associates | Analysis of failure modes and causes. Now known as Exponent. | |
| Granger Associates | Established in 1956, Granger focused on communications, antennas, and electrostatic dischargers. Acquired by Digital Switch Corporation, which in turn merged with Alcatel-Lucent. | |
| Katun Corporation | World's largest supplier of after-market copier parts with $360 million revenue in 2001. Sold to Banc of America Investors and Svoboda Collins Inc. in 2002 | |
| Kimball Resources | Provided energy management and trading services. Founded in 1985. | |
| Mirage Systems | Develops military stealth technology and "Ground Penetrating Synthetic Aperture Radar" (GPSAR) for Black Hawk helicopters, unmanned and light aircraft. | |
| Raychem | Established in 1957, Raychem created insulation products, including shrink-wrap wire insulation. It was purchased by Tyco International in 1999 for $2.9 billion. | |
| Scientific Products | Created electronic products, one of which was a metronome. | |
| Strategic Business Insights (SBI) | Formerly SRI Consulting-Business Intelligence, combines ongoing research with consulting services to create insights that affect customers, business, and technology. | |
| Superflex | Robotics project, aiming at human augmentation. | |
| Systems Control, Inc. (SCI) | Created engineering systems. | |
| Telecommunications International (TCI) | Founded in 1961 to design and manufacture antennas. | |
| Vista Research | Remote sensing and signal processing applications, including leak detection and location. | |

== Legal, policy and finance ==
| Name | Notability | References |
|---|---|---|
| Center for Continuing Study of the California Economy | Performs long-term studies of the economy of California for both public and private sector clients. | |
| Decision Focus Inc. | Analysis-based planning and market analysis. Merged with Aeronomics in 1997 to make DFI/Aeronomics Inc., which changed its name to Talus Solutions and was acquired by Manugistics in 2000. Manugistics was acquired by JDA Software in 2006. | |
| Economic Research Associates | Performed tourism market analysis, particularly for Disney World and other theme parks. Sold to Planning Research Corporation in 1969. | |
| Fair Isaac Corporation | Helps companies win new customers and markets. Their software managed about 85% of credit cards worldwide as of 2006. | |
| Global Business Network | Strategy consulting organization. | |
| Harrison Price Company | Founded by Harrison Price in 1978. Economic consultants. | |
| Institute for the Future | Think tank that assists corporations with long-term planning. | |
| Litigation Risk Analysis | Applied decision analysis to legal risk estimation. | |
| Litigation Risk Management Institute | Performed risk management and analysis. | |
| SmartOrg | Performed business development and research services. | |
| Strategic Decisions Group (SDG) | Decision analysis-based planning; bought by Navigent and then returned to SDG via a management buyout. | |
| Strategic Economic Decisions | Decision analysis and business strategy. Founded in 1981 by Horace "Woody" Brock. | |
| The Beron Group | Created decision analysis services and related tools. Founded in 1985. | |

== Information and computing sciences ==
| Name | Notability | References |
|---|---|---|
| Alterego | Created software to customize web page contents to thin clients. Acquired by Macromedia in 2002. | |
| Australian Artificial Intelligence Institute (AAII) | Contract research organization that specializes in artificial intelligence in Australia. | |
| ANSA Software | Built Paradox commercial relational database software. The company was purchased by Borland in 1987 who licensed it to Corel in 1996. | |
| August Systems | Created fault-tolerant software. | |
| BusinessLand | One of the first companies to sell personal computers; founded in 1982, and by 1988 had over $1 billion sales per year. Sold to JWP, Inc. in 1991 for $54 million. | |
| China Mobilesoft | Created software for mobile device manufacturers, primarily for end users in China. Acquired by PalmSource in 2004, which was acquired by ACCESS in 2005. | |
| Cohesive Network Services | Provided network engineering services. Purchased for $100 million in 1999 by Exodus Communications. | |
| Communications Intelligence Corporation | Supplies electronic signature solutions and biometric signature verification to the financial industry. Founded in 1981 by Hew Crane, Earle Jones, John Ostrem and Peter Edberg. | |
| Comware International | Built gateways for IBM systems. Moved to sensing storage and display systems. | |
| Cybercash | Provided online financial transactions. Acquired by Verisign. | |
| DataQuest | Created market surveys and studies of technical fields. Acquired by ACNielsen in 1978 and Gartner Group in 1995. | |
| DenseNet | Created optical signal processing and switching devices. | |
| Desti | Travel guide based on the CALO artificial intelligence project | |
| Digideck | Created data compression software for sound recordings. Founded in 1986 and sold to Datacast in 1996. | |
| Discern Communications | Acquired by Spanlink Communications. Automated question-answering for customer service centers. | |
| E-Trade | Online discount equity trading | |
| enVia Partners | A venture capital firm that launches companies that focus on wireless technologies. | |
| Etak | Founded in 1983, this company created digital maps for navigation systems. Acquired by Tele Atlas in 2000. | |
| e-Vue | Dissolved company. Offered MPEG-4 compliant encoding and authoring tools. | |
| Firetide | Produced network devices for a cheap, rapidly deployable WiFi service. | |
| FX Development Group | Founded in 1989, this company created terminals used for foreign exchange, bond and energy trading. They were acquired by Dow Jones & Company in 1991. | |
| GWcom | Created two-way pagers and provided cell phone services in China. Split into two companies, GWtech and Byair. | |
| Global Internet Access Services | Internet service provider, founded in 1987. Sold to Verio, who subsequently sold it to Nippon Telegraph and Telephone around 1996. | |
| Global Internet Software | Wrote network security software for Windows NT machines. Purchased for $40 million in 1997 by Cisco Systems; their technology was integrated into Cisco's PIX firewall. | |
| Grabit | Produces industrial automation and materials handling solutions. | |
| Innovation Research of California | Created software that helped the creative process in an organization. Renamed to Innovation Engines in 2000. | |
| Interop | Specialized in internet communications and enterprise networking equipment. | |
| Kestrel Institute | Developed logic programming and AI software. | |
| Kuato Studios | Game company developing a platform designed to make learning more entertaining. | |
| Machine Intelligence Corp (MIC) | AI application that improved assembly line work. | |
| Metapath | Created local area networking equipment; founded in 1984. | |
| Microbot | Created miniature robots for teaching. Sold to UMI around 1991. | |
| MobileSoft Technology | Creator of linux-based embedded systems, based in China. | |
| Netiva Software | Created database systems for internet applications. Renamed to Portera Systems in 1998 and was acquired by Exigen Group in 2002. | |
| Neural Systems Corp | Created "trainable" logic to increase recording density. | |
| Nuance Communications | Provides speech, biometrics, automotive, mobile, and imaging solutions for enterprise, healthcare, government, and other industries. | |
| Ordinate | Created software to measure the quality of spoken language. | |
| Packethop | Creates packet routing systems for wireless networks. | |
| Reactive Network Solutions | Created network security products to protect against denial of service attacks. | |
| Redwood Robotics | Acquired by Google in 2013; it was working on a new generation of robot arms that are simple to program, inexpensive, and safe to operate alongside people. | |
| Rooftop Communications | Fixed site wireless internet access. Sold for $57 million in 1999 to Nokia. | |
| SecureSoft | Created secure database products. Renamed to Crosslogix in 1997, awarded $22 million in venture capital funds in 2000, and purchased by BEA Systems in February 2003. | |
| Secure Products | Develops anti-counterfeiting and anti-diversion systems based on material marking and recognition technology. | |
| Siri | Acquired by Apple in 2010. Its virtual personal assistant technology was first included in the iPhone 4S. | |
| Skypilot Networks | Created wireless internet access products. Acquired by Trilliant Incorporated in 2009. | |
| Social Kinetics | Acquired by RedBrick Health in 2010, provides methods and technology for driving the success of enterprise social media. | |
| Sportvision | Offers virtual advertising and imaging solutions for television, including the yellow line in football and the yellow puck in hockey. Previously known as PVI Virtual Media Services. | |
| Symantec | Founded by Gary Hendrix in 1979, this company started as an AI-based database query language and system called QandA; evolved into large antivirus vendor. | |
| Syntelligence | Created AI software applications, founded in 1983. | |
| Systar | Software applications for computer networking. | |
| Teleos Research | Created robotic systems and devices. | |
| Tempo AI | Created a smart calendar for the iPhone. | |
| TGV | Founded in 1988, this company created communications software and simulation software for VAX computers. TGV stood for "Two Guys and a Vax". The company was sold to Cisco Systems in 1996. | |
| Tout | Offers a web application that captures life's "defining moments" via real-time video streaming and sharing. | |
| Trapit | Offers a virtual personal assistant that uses artificial intelligence to understand your interests and personalize the web. | |
| Verbatim Corporation | Established in 1969, created recording media including floppy diskettes. Acquired by Mitsubishi Chemical. | |
| Vocera Communications | Created wireless communications systems | |
| Wireless Security Corp | Created WiFi security systems. Acquired by McAfee in 2005. | |

== Biosciences ==
=== Health science ===
| Name | Notability | References |
|---|---|---|
| Artificial Muscle | Acquired by Bayer MaterialScience. Develops, designs, and manufactures actuator and sensing components based on electroactive polymers. In 2011, AMI announced ViviTouch, bringing sensory vibration to the mobile gaming experience. | |
| CCS Associates | Founded in 1985 on analysis and risk assessment of chemicals in the environment; moved to drug development and toxicology. | |
| CONSULT it | Provides consulting services, primarily in biotechnology, pharmaceutical and chemical fields; also serves as a venture capital firm. | |
| DaVinci Healthcare Partners | Performed healthcare research and development, focusing on cancer care and related areas. | |
| Genetrace Systems | Created drug leads through genetic profiling. | |
| Intuitive Surgical | Creates systems for robotic-assisted minimally invasive surgery, most notably the da Vinci Surgical System. | |
| Health Industries Research Company | Performed market research for healthcare companies, with offices in several states. | |
| Health Strategies Group | Provided research and consulting services for healthcare products companies. | |
| Intuity Medical | Offers diabetes management solutions. They are developing a blood glucose monitoring system designed to make testing easy, convenient and discreet. | |
| Locus Pharmaceuticals | Accelerates discovery and development of novel, small molecule drug therapies. | |
| Menlo Biomedical | Global pharmaceutical and healthcare research organization. Purchased by Isis Research in 2000 and Synovate Healthcare in 2003. | |
| Orchid CellMark | Offers proprietary pharmacogenetics and microfluidics platform technologies | |
| Pangene Corporation | Created anticancer and antiviral enzyme inhibitors. | |
| Redcoat Solutions | Created a product to detect the presence of bed bugs in a room. | |
| Songbird Hearing | Created the world's first disposable hearing aid. | |
| SynVax Pharmaceuticals | Created biologically active peptides based on patents granted while at SRI. | |
| Telesensory Systems | Created devices to aid handicapped people. | |

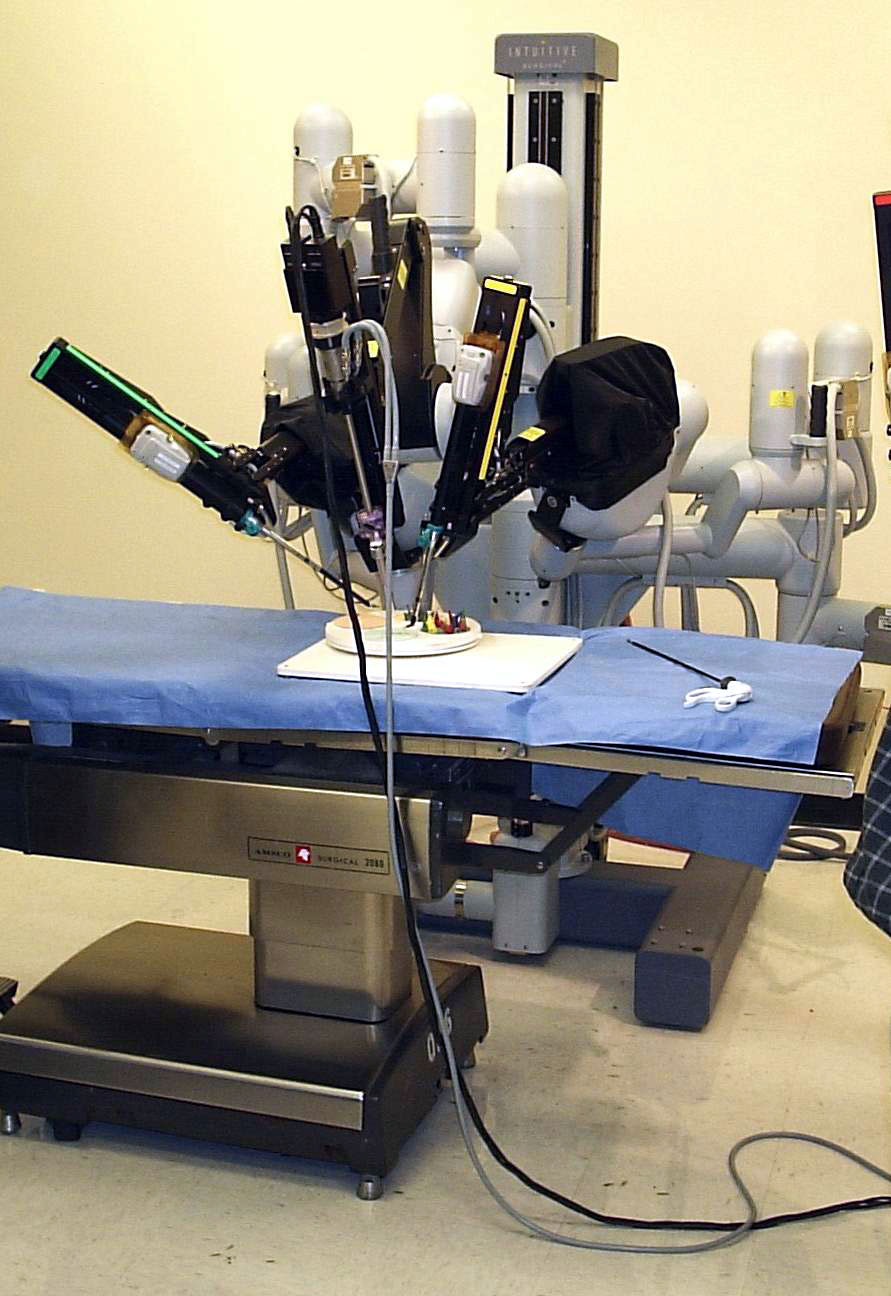
Intuitive Surgical's robotic surgery system, the da Vinci Surgical System

=== Food science ===
| Name | Notability | References |
|---|---|---|
| AgIndustries | Created strategic analyses for crop protection and other agricultural industries. | |
| Ridge Vineyards | California winery specializing in premium Cabernet Sauvignon, Zinfandel, and Chardonnay wines. | |
| Tragon Corporation | Started as taste testing company in 1974, but expanded into a broad consulting organization for the food industry. | |

== Physical sciences ==
| Name | Notability | References |
|---|---|---|
| 4C Technology | Created silicon-based preceramic polymers. Failed in 1999. | |
| Electroprint Corp | Financed by Sun Chemical in 1971, this company created an electronically controlled stencil screening system to place images on cloth. | |
| Explosives Technology Co. | Explosive products including the cutters that separated the ascent and descent vehicles in the first lunar departure. The company was sold to Ducommun in 1971. | |
| Finnigan Instruments | Created smaller and cheaper gas chromatograph mass spectrometers. Now known as Thermo Finnigan and Thermo Electronics. | |
| Horner Associates | Computer-aided chemical design | |
| Lamina Ceramics | Now a subsidiary of Lighting Science Group Corporation. Makes advanced lighting products. | |
| Lightscape Materials | Develops and supplies phosphor solutions for the LED industry | |
| Power Survey Company | Provides mobile contact voltage detection services to utilities and municipalities worldwide. | |
| Princeton Lightwave | Makes high-performance optical components for advanced network applications. | |
| SRI Consulting (SRIC) | A division of IHS Inc., SRIC is a leading business research service for the chemical industry. | |

== See also ==
- List of SRI International people
