= Charles Irby =

Software architect

Charles H. Irby was a software architect on SRI International's oN-Line System (NLS), where he worked to establish many of the user interface standards that exist today. He also led the design group for the Xerox Star. He co-founded Metaphor Computer Systems and led the design of its products.

== Education ==
Irby earned a Bachelor's in Physics and a Master's in Computer Science from University of California, Santa Barbara, and completed the required coursework towards a doctorate.

== Career ==
Irby joined SRI International's Augmentation Research Center after witnessing the 1968 The Mother of All Demos, to work on oN-Line System (NLS), eventually becoming chief architect for the system.

He then worked at Xerox PARC as the director of the Advanced Development Group in their Office System Division, Irby led the user interface design of the Xerox Star.

Irby then co-founded and was the Senior Vice President of Engineering for Metaphor Computer Systems, and was later Executive Vice President of product development at General Magic, which created the Magic Cap and Telescript products. Most recently, Irby worked for Silicon Graphics (SGI), where he contributed to their consumer products and technology, and managed the engineering team that had previously developed the Nintendo 64. Irby retired in 1997.

He was a presenter at Douglas Engelbart's December 8, 1998 "Unfinished Revolution" event at Stanford University.
