= The Mother of All Demos =

1968 computer demonstration by Douglas Engelbart

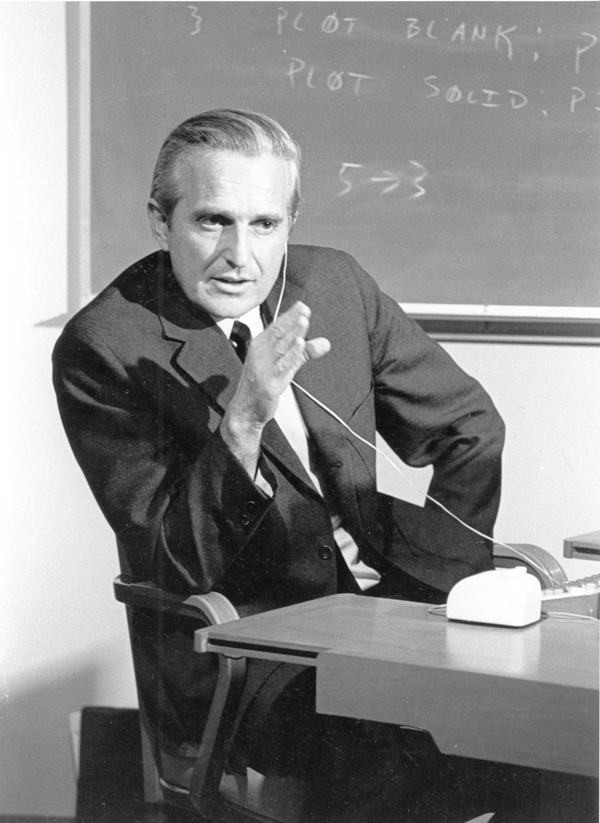
Engelbart practicing for the demo

"The Mother of All Demos" was a landmark computer demonstration, named retroactively, of developments by Stanford Research Institute's Augmentation Research Center. It was presented at the Association for Computing Machinery / Institute of Electrical and Electronics Engineers (ACM/IEEE)—Computer Society's Fall Joint Computer Conference in San Francisco, by Douglas Engelbart, on December 9, 1968.

The 90-minute live demonstration featured the introduction of a complete computer hardware and software system called the oN-Line System or, more commonly, NLS, which demonstrated for the first time many of the fundamental elements of modern personal computing, including windows, hypertext, graphics, efficient navigation and command input, video conferencing, the computer mouse, word processing, dynamic file linking, revision control, and a collaborative real-time editor.

Engelbart's presentation was the first to publicly demonstrate all of these elements in a single system. The demonstration was highly influential and spawned similar projects at Xerox PARC in the early 1970s. The underlying concepts and technologies influenced the operating systems of the Apple Macintosh, the Atari ST, the Commodore Amiga, the Acorn Archimedes, and the Microsoft Windows graphical user interface, in the 1980s and 1990s.

== Background ==
Much of Engelbart's thought that led to the development of his Augmentation Research Center (ARC), as well as the oN-Line System, was derived from the "research culture" of World War II and the early Cold War. A notable source of inspiration to Engelbart was the article "As We May Think", written by Vannevar Bush in The Atlantic magazine, which Engelbart read while stationed as a United States Navy radar technician in the Philippines in 1946. In Engelbart's view, in order to steer society into the right use of scientific knowledge derived from the war, that knowledge would need to be better managed and regulated.

In his book From Counterculture to Cyberculture, Fred Turner gave voice to this view, which arose from seeing the unintended effects of technology on the postwar world:

[T]he American military had developed technologies with which it might destroy the world. In its wake, scientists and technologists had begun to fan out around the globe, seeking to use their knowledge to eradicate disease and increase food production, often in an effort to win the cold war loyalties of Third World nations. Engelbart had read about these efforts and saw that they often backfired. Rapid food production led to the depletion of the soil; the eradication of insects led to ecological imbalances.

This ultimately led to the idea that beyond merely performing calculations, computers could be used to augment the capabilities of the human mind.

== Demonstration ==
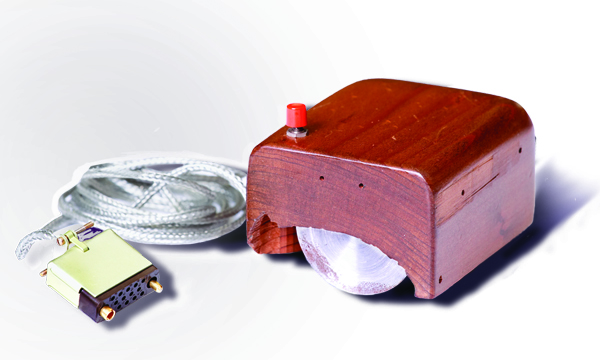
The first prototype of a computer mouse, as designed by Bill English from Douglas Engelbart's sketches

Engelbart had assembled a team of computer engineers and programmers at his Augmentation Research Center (ARC) located in Stanford University's Stanford Research Institute (SRI) in the early 1960s. His idea was to free computing from merely being about number crunching and for it to become a tool for communications and information-retrieval. He wanted to turn Vannevar Bush's idea for a Memex machine into reality, where a machine used interactively by one person could "augment" their intelligence.

Over the course of six years, with the funding help of both NASA and ARPA, his team went about putting together all the elements that would make such a computer system a reality. At the urging of ARPA's director, Robert Taylor, the NLS would make its first public appearance at the 1968 Fall Joint Computer Conference in San Francisco's Civic Auditorium.

The conference session was presented under the title A research center for augmenting human intellect. Approximately 1,000 computer professionals were in attendance in the auditorium to witness the presentation. Notable attendees in the audience included Alan Kay, Charles Irby and Andy van Dam, as well as Bob Sproull.

Engelbart, with the help of his geographically distributed team (including Bill Paxton), with Bill English directing the presentation's technical elements, demonstrated NLS's functions. (Note: English was listed as the conference paper's co-author and is acknowledged as one of the principal engineers responsible for NLS and the demo.) The presentation used an Eidophor video projector that allowed the video output from the NLS computer to be displayed on a large 6.7-metre (22 ft) high screen so the audience could see what Engelbart was doing.

The Augment researchers also created two customized homemade modems at 1200 baud – high-speed for 1968 – linked via a leased line to transfer data from the computer workstation keyboard and mouse at the Civic Auditorium to their Menlo Park headquarters' SDS-940 computer. (Note: In 1968, 1200 baud—yielding 1.2 kbit/s at the time—was fast for a modem, and would be considered so for a decade. The modems also were only unidirectional, so one was needed for uplink and the other for downlink.)

In order to provide live two-way video between the lab and the conference hall, two microwave links were used. English also commanded a video switcher that controlled what was displayed on the big screen. The camera operator in Menlo Park was Stewart Brand, who at the time was a non-computer person, best known as the editor of the Whole Earth Catalog. Stewart Brand advised Engelbart and the team about how to present the demo. Engelbart got to know Stewart Brand when they experimented with LSD at the same lab.

During the 90-minute presentation, Engelbart used his mouse prototype to move around the screen, highlight text, and resize windows. This was the first time that an integrated system for manipulating text onscreen was presented publicly. (Note: The German company Telefunken invented a "Rollkugel" mouse in the 1960s, releasing it several months prior to Engelbart's presentation. It appeared in its advertising literature for the Telefunken SIG-100 monitor in October 1968. For more information refer to the history of the computer mouse.)

At separate times, his Augment associates Jeff Rulifson and Bill Paxton appeared in another portion of the screen to help edit the text remotely from ARC. While they were editing they could see each other's screen, talk and see each other as well. He further demonstrated that clicking on underlined text would then link to another page of information, demonstrating the concept of hypertext.

When he finished the demonstration, the audience gave him a standing ovation. To further demonstrate the system, a separate room was set aside so that attendees could take a closer look at the NLS workstations and ask Engelbart questions. One last notion is that of Engelbart's NLS system. As Fred Turner stated in his book From Counterculture to Cyberculture:

Engelbart promulgated a philosophy of 'bootstrapping', in which each experimental transformation of the socio-technical system that was the NLS would feed back into the system itself, causing it to evolve (and presumably to improve).

== Influence ==
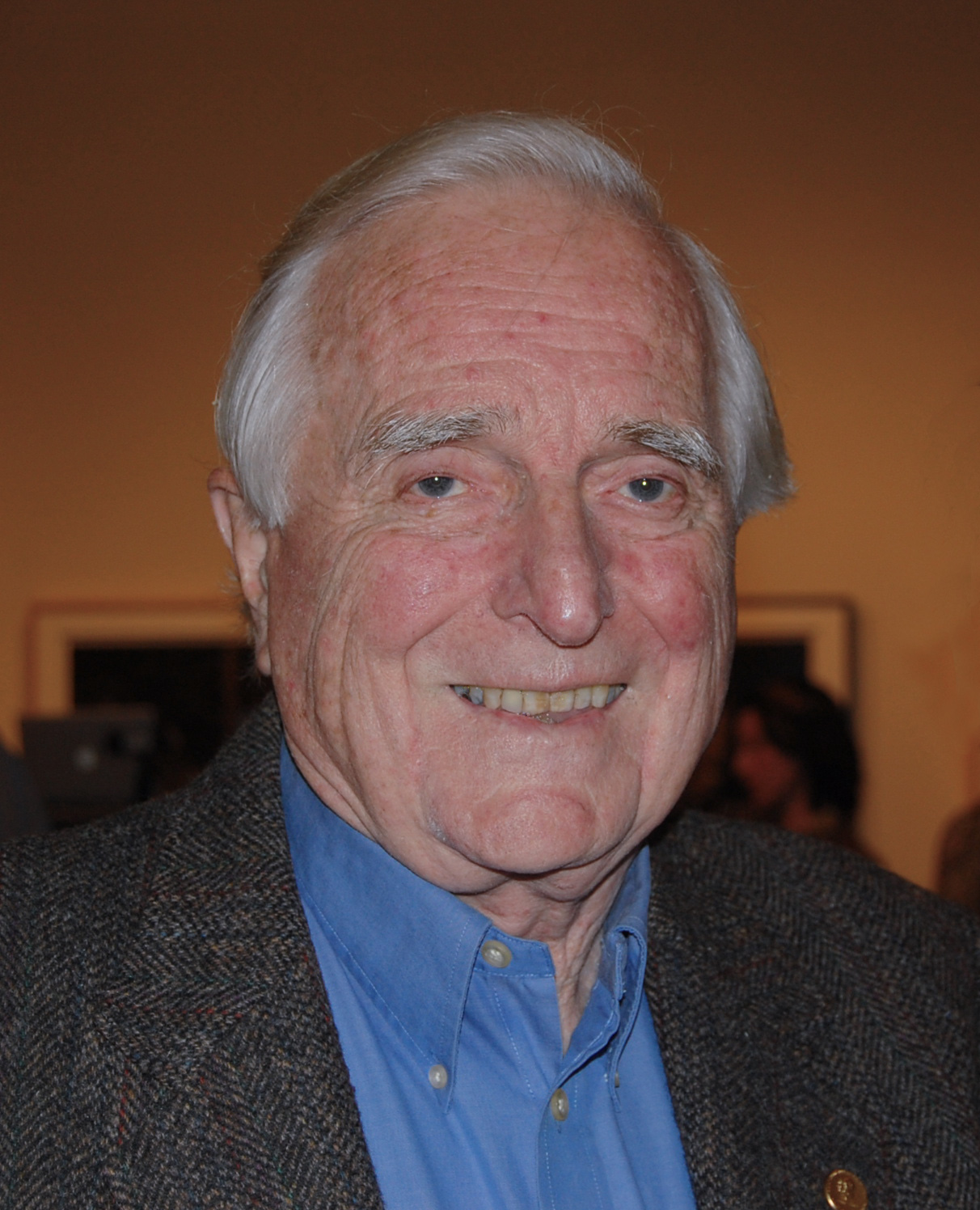
Douglas Engelbart in 2008, at the 40th anniversary celebrations of "The Mother of All Demos" in San Francisco

Prior to the demonstration, a significant portion of the computer science community thought Engelbart was "a crackpot". When he was finished, he was described as "dealing lightning with both hands". Van Dam was working on a similar system, but had only begun work on it in 1967, and was stunned to see how mature NLS was: he practically accosted Engelbart with his line of questioning in the post-presentation question and answer session. After he finished interrogating Engelbart, van Dam agreed the NLS demo was the greatest thing he ever witnessed. Van Dam would go on to become a leader in teaching computer graphics in the 1970s. The actual impact on computer science, however, was limited:

Everybody was blown away and thought it was absolutely fantastic and nothing else happened. There was almost no further impact. People thought it was too far out and they were still working on their physical teletypes, hadn't even migrated to glass teletypes yet. So it sparked interest in a small vigorous research community but it didn't have impact on the computer field as a whole.

— Andy van Dam, Reflections on a Half-Century of Hypertext (29:15). Keynote at Hypertext 2019 conference

As the 1970s started, much of Engelbart's team departed ARC and went their own ways, with many of them ending up at the Xerox Palo Alto Research Center (PARC). Among these people were Bill English, who would further improve upon the mouse. Also migrating to PARC was Engelbart's former backer at NASA and ARPA, Robert Taylor. Alan Kay, also in attendance at the demo, would go on to design an object-oriented computing environment called Smalltalk while he was at PARC.

By 1973, the Xerox Alto was a fully functional personal computer similar to the NLS terminal which Engelbart had demonstrated in 1968, but much smaller and physically refined. With its mouse-driven GUI, the Alto would go on to influence Steve Jobs and Apple's Macintosh computer and operating system in the 1980s. Eventually, Microsoft's Windows operating system would follow the Macintosh and use a multi-button mouse in the same way that the Alto and the NLS system did.

Engelbart's influence peaked at the conference, and he was mostly remembered throughout the 1970s and much of the 1980s as the inventor of the mouse and hypertext, famously adapted by Apple and Microsoft. On the demo's 30th anniversary in 1998, Stanford University held a major conference to celebrate Engelbart's visionary impact on computing and the World Wide Web. By the time the 40th anniversary was celebrated, Engelbart's demo was acknowledged as one of the most important in computer history.

In 2015, a performance art musical presentation called The Demo depicted the event. It was composed and performed by Mikel Rouse and Ben Neill, with its premiere at Stanford's Bing Concert Hall.

== Bibliography ==
- Bardini, Thierry (2000). Bootstrapping: Douglas Engelbart, Coevolution, and the Origins of Personal Computing. Stanford: Stanford University Press. ISBN 978-0-8047-3871-2.
- Blackstone, John (December 9, 1998). "Of Mice and Man". CBS News. New York. Archived from the original on December 11, 2013.
- Brown/MIT (1995). "1995 Vannevar Bush Symposium, Tape 2 – Doug Engelbart". Doug Engelbart Video Archives. The Internet Archive.
- Bülow, Ralf (April 28, 2009). "Auf den Spuren der deutschen Computermaus" [On the trail of the German computer mouse] (in German). Hannover: Heise Verlag GmbH & Co. KG. Archived from the original on November 27, 2013.
- Edwards, Benj (December 9, 2008). "The computer mouse turns 40". San Francisco: Macworld. Archived from the original on January 2, 2014.
- Engelbart, Douglas C.; English, William K. (1969). "A research center for augmenting human intellect". AFIPS Fall Joint Computer Conference. 33: 395–410.
- Gladwell, Malcolm (May 16, 2011). "CREATION MYTH: Xerox PARC, Apple, and the truth about innovation". The New Yorker. New York. Archived from the original on December 5, 2013.
- Engelbart, Douglas (2008a) [1968]. "Original Program Announcement for Mother of All Demos". Coding paradise. Archived from the original on September 24, 2013.
- Markoff, John (2005). What the Dormouse Said: How the Sixties Counterculture Shaped the Personal Computer Industry (E-book ed.). New York: Penguin Group. ISBN 978-1-1012-0108-4. "E-book pages are approximate due to device and fonts used"
- Markoff, John (March 25, 2015). "The Musical 'The Demo' at Stanford Recreates the Dawn of the Digital Age". The New York Times.
- Metroactive (June 1, 2005). "From Pranksters to PCs: An excerpt from John Markoff's 'What the Dormouse Said' explains how the '60s counterculture shaped the computer industry". Metro, Silicon Valley's Weekly Newspaper. San Jose. Archived from the original on January 7, 2014.
- Metz, Cade (December 11, 2008). "The Mother of All Demos — 150 years ahead of its time". The Register. London. Archived from the original on December 3, 2013.
- Shiels, Maggie (December 12, 2008). "The Valley Visionaries". dot.life. London: BBC News. Archived from the original on August 27, 2013.
- Sorensen, Benjamin (April 5, 2015). "World premiere of 'The Demo' is beautiful, but misses the mark". The Stanford Daily.
- SRI Staff (2008). "Robert Sproull (Opening remarks)". Engelbart and the Dawn of Interactive Computing: 40th Anniversary Celebration. San Francisco: SRI International. Archived from the original on September 16, 2012.
- Turner, Fred (2006). From Counterculture to Cyberculture: Stewart Brand, the Whole Earth Network, and the Rise of Digital Utopianism. Chicago and London: University of Chicago Press. ISBN 9780226817415.
- Tweney, Dylan (December 9, 2008). "Dec. 9, 1968: The Mother of All Demos". Wired. Archived from the original on December 11, 2013.
- VanHemert, Kyle (March 30, 2015). "The Most Epic Demo in Computer History is Now an Opera". Wired.
- Wired Staff (January 1, 2004). "The Click Heard Round The World". Wired. Archived from the original on December 22, 2016.
- Wolvertone, Troy (December 9, 2008). "Remembering Engelbart's epic demo". Mercury News. San Jose. Archived from the original on December 11, 2013.
