= Elizabeth J. Feinler =

American information scientist (born 1931)

Elizabeth "Jake" Feinler
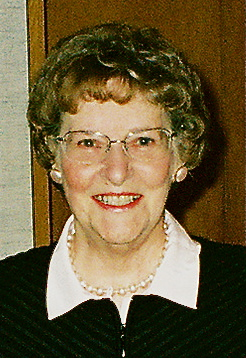
- Jake Feinler, c.2011
- Born: Elizabeth Jocelyn Feinler; March 2, 1931 (age 95); Wheeling, West Virginia, U.S.
- Citizenship: American
- Education: West Liberty State College and Purdue University
- Known for: Running the original ARPANET NIC at SRI
- Scientific career
- Fields: Computer science
- Workplaces: SRI, NASA Ames, Computer History Museum

Elizabeth Jocelyn "Jake" Feinler (born March 2, 1931) is an American information scientist. From 1972 until 1989 she was director of the Network Information Systems Center at the Stanford Research Institute (SRI International). Her group operated the Network Information Center (NIC) for the ARPANET as it evolved into the Defense Data Network (DDN) and the Internet. While at NIC, she and her team created the Host Naming Registry (WHOIS) and the top-level domain naming convention (.com, .gov, .org… etc) that the internet still uses today. Before her inventions the internet would have not been able to scale and grow as much as it has today. Without her contributions users would have constantly use their IP address to get to their desired website, with the top-level naming convention it has made the navigation much more user friendly and convenient. The impact that her contribution has made is to make the internet much more usable for the average person and much easier for the internet to be managed as each domain there was a person who was attached to it, which is what the Host Naming Registry was for. Her contributions to the internet are still being used despite her retirement and is now managed by ICANN.

== Early life and education ==
Feinler was born on March 2, 1931, in Wheeling, West Virginia, where she also grew up. In 1954, she received an undergraduate degree from West Liberty State College, the first from her family to attend college.

== Career ==
=== Early career ===
Feinler was working toward a Ph.D. in biochemistry from Purdue University when she decided to earn some money by working for a year or two before starting on her thesis. Working at the Chemical Abstracts Service in Columbus, Ohio, she served as an assistant editor on a huge project to index the world's chemical compounds. There she became intrigued with the challenges of creating such large data compilations and never returned to biochemistry. Instead, in 1960, she relocated to California and joined the Information Research Department at the Stanford Research Institute (now SRI International) where she worked to develop the Handbook of Psychopharmacology and the Chemical Process Economics Handbook.

=== ARPANET and NIC ===
Feinler was leading the Literature Research section of SRI's library when, in 1972, Doug Engelbart recruited her to join his Augmentation Research Center (ARC), which was sponsored by the Information Processing Techniques Office of the US Defense Advanced Research Project Agency (DARPA). Her first task was to write a Resource Handbook for the first demonstration of the ARPANET at the International Computer Communication Conference. By 1974 she was the principal investigator to help plan and run the new Network Information Center (NIC) for the ARPANET.

The NIC provided reference service to users (initially over the phone and by physical mail), maintained and published a directory of people (the "white pages"), a resource handbook (the "yellow pages", a list of services) and the protocol handbook. After the Network Operations Center at Bolt, Beranek and Newman brought new hosts onto the network, the NIC registered names, provided access control for terminals, audit trail and billing information, and distributed Request for Comments (RFCs). Feinler, working with Steve Crocker, Jon Postel, Joyce Reynolds and other members of the Network Working Group (NWG), developed RFCs into the official set of technical notes for the ARPANET and later the Internet. The NIC provided the first links to on-line documents using the NLS Journal system developed at ARC. Engelbart continued leading-edge research in the ARC, while the NIC provided a service to all network users. This led to establishing the NIC as a separate project with Feinler as manager.

The NWG and Feinler's team defined a simple text file format for host names in 1974, and revised the format several times as the networks evolved. The host table itself was continuously updated on almost a daily basis. In 1975, the Defense Communication Agency (DCA) took operational control and support, and over time split the ARPANET into research and military networks. DCA used the name Defense Data Network to refer to the combination, and the NIC served as its information center. When e-mail and the File Transfer Protocol (FTP) became available around 1976, the NIC used them to deliver information to users via the network. In 1977, Postel moved to the Information Sciences Institute, and the RFC editor and number assignment functions moved with him, while the NIC stayed at SRI. By 1979, Feinler and her group were working on ways to scale up the name service. In 1982, an Internet protocol was defined by Ken Harrenstien and Vic White in her group to access the online directory of people, called Whois. As the Internet expanded, the Domain Name System was designed to handle the growth by delegating naming authority to distributed name servers. Her group became the overall naming authority of the Internet, developing and managing the name registries of the top-level domains of .mil, .gov, .edu, .org, and .com. Even the names of the top-level domains, based on generic categories such as .com were suggestions of the NIC team, approved by the Internet developer community.

=== Later career ===
After Feinler left SRI, in 1989, she worked as a network requirements manager and helped develop guidelines for managing the NASA Science Internet (NSI) NIC at the NASA Ames Research Center. Feinler donated an extensive collection of early Internet papers to the Computer History Museum in Mountain View, California, and after she retired from NASA in 1996 worked as a volunteer at the museum to organize the material. She published a history of the NIC in 2010. In 2012, Feinler was inducted into the Internet Hall of Fame by the Internet Society. In July, 2013 she received the Jonathan B. Postel Service Award "for her contributions to the early development and administration of the Internet through her leadership of the Network Information Center (NIC) for the ARPANET".

== Retirement ==
At the turn of the 21st century, Feinler was inducted into the SRI Alumni Hall of Fame. In retirement she consistently volunteers at the Computer History Museum located in Mountain View, California. Feinler describes her role at CHM:

"Over the years, while running the Network Information Center (NIC) on the Internet, I collected close to 1500 shelf feet of papers pertaining to the Internet. Currently I am working as a volunteer at the Computer History Museum in Mountain View to organize these papers. I am also writing a Finding Aid to assist scholars who may want to use the collection. It will describe the contents, significance, and organization scheme of the collection. While most in Silicon Valley are charging ahead, I can safely say I am going backwards. :-) If you haven't been to the museum, check it out. It has a great collection of artifacts, exhibits and documents. In May the Babbage Machine exhibit opens. Who can resist a computer with 8,000 mechanical moving parts!!!!"

== Nickname ==
Feinler explains how she got her nickname, "Jake":

When I was born, double names were popular. My real name is Elizabeth Jocelyn Feinler, and my family was going to call me Betty Jo to match my sister’s name, Mary Lou. Only two at the time, my sister’s version of Betty Jo sounded like Baby Jake. I always say, Thank goodness they dropped the "Baby".

== See also ==
- List of pioneers in computer science
