= E. Finley Carter =

American electrical engineer

- Born: July 1, 1901; Elgin, Texas
- Died: January 18, 1979 (aged 77); Palo Alto, California
- Education: Rice Institute
- Awards: IEEE Fellow; IEEE Founders Medal (1969)
- Scientific career
- Workplaces: General Electric; United Research Corporation; Sylvania Electric Products; SRI International

Emmett Finley Carter (July 1, 1901 - February 18, 1979) was an electrical engineer that worked at several companies; most notably, he was in upper management of Sylvania Electric Products and was the director, and later president, of SRI International from 1956 to 1963.

== Early life and education ==
Carter was born on July 1, 1901, in Elgin, Texas, to Alfred Hinds Carter and Jimmie Lucretia Stevens. He graduated from Rice Institute (in Houston, Texas) in 1922 with a degree in electrical engineering.

== Early career ==
After graduation, he joined General Electric in Schenectady, New York, where he developed high-power broadcast transmitters for WGY in Schenectady; KGO in Oakland; and KOA in Denver. He held a variety of positions, particularly in research and development, leaving the company in charge of a division.

In 1929, Carter became the director of the radio division of United Research Corporation in New York, which was part of Warner Pictures. In this position, he designed Brunswick radios, circuits, and receivers, and held several patents covering his work during this period.

He joined Sylvania Electric Products in September 1932 as a consulting engineer, and would eventually become assistant chief engineer; in February 1941, he organized a new industrial relations department of Sylvania, and was elected director of Sylvania in March, 1943. In 1945, Carter was named Vice President of Engineering and in 1952 he was named Vice President and Technical Director.

== Later career ==
In 1954, Carter joined the Sanford Research Institute (SRI), now known as SRI International, as a Manager of Research Operations, reporting to director Jesse E. Hobson; his duties focused on coordinating interdisciplinary research efforts, particularly the ones that involved both physical and life sciences, or both economics and engineering.

In 1956, Carter became the director of SRI, and a member of its board of directors. In 1959, SRI reorganized its leadership structure, and Carter was named the organization's first president. In 1958, SRI established its Life Sciences division under Bruce Graham. Carter was president until 1963, and retired from SRI in 1965.

== Awards and memberships ==
Carter was a member of the IEEE, American Radio Relay League, Sigma Xi, Eta Kappa Nu, and Tau Beta Pi. He was a fellow of the Institute of Radio Engineers, and served on its board of directors.

He was named an IEEE Fellow in 1949, and received the IEEE Founders Medal in 1969 "for outstanding contributions to the electrical engineering profession and to the Institute of Electrical and Electronics Engineers through wise and imaginative leadership in the planning and administration of technical developments in electronics and telecommunications".
