= Bill English (computer engineer) =

American computer engineer (1929–2020)

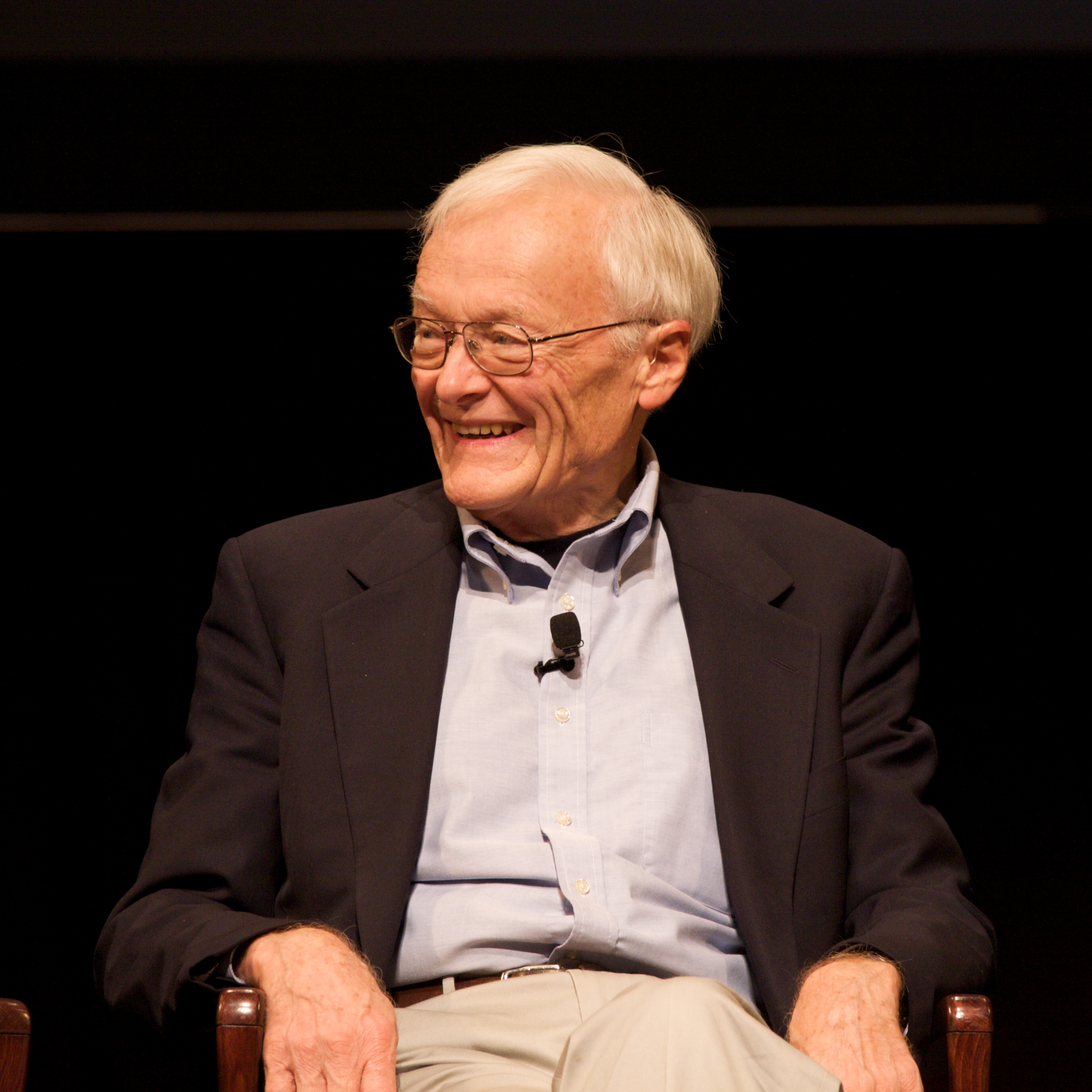
- William English in 2008
- Born: William Kirk English; January 27, 1929; Lexington, Kentucky, U.S.
- Died: July 26, 2020 (aged 91); San Rafael, California, U.S.
- Known for: Development of the computer mouse
- Scientific career
- Institutions: SRI International's ARC; Xerox PARC; Sun Microsystems

William Kirk English (January 27, 1929 – July 26, 2020) was an American computer engineer who contributed to the development of the computer mouse while working for Douglas Engelbart at SRI International's Augmentation Research Center. He would later work for Xerox PARC and Sun Microsystems.

== Early life ==
English was born on January 27, 1929, in Lexington, Kentucky. The only son of Harry English and Caroline (Gray) English, he had two half-brothers from his father's previous marriage. Harry English was an electrical engineer who managed coal mines and Caroline was a homemaker. William, or Bill as he was known, attended a boarding school in Arizona and then studied electrical engineering at the University of Kentucky.

== Career ==
English served in the US Navy until the late 1950s, including postings in northern California and Japan. He then joined the Stanford Research Institute in the 1960s to work on magnets, and built one of the first all-magnetic arithmetic units with Hewitt Crane. In 1964, he was the first person to join Douglas Engelbart's lab, the Augmentation Research Center.

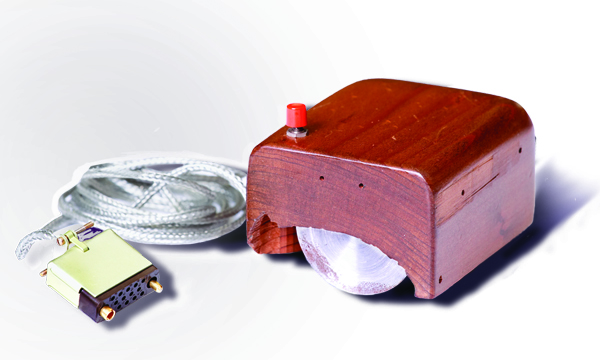
The SRI prototype mouse, designed by Engelbart and built by English

He and Douglas Engelbart share credit for creating the first computer mouse in 1963; English built the initial prototype, and was its first user, based on Engelbart's notes. English led a 1965 project, sponsored by NASA, which evaluated the best way to select a point on a computer display; the mouse was the winner. English was also instrumental at The Mother of All Demos in 1968, which showcased the mouse and other technologies developed as part of their NLS (oN-Line System). In particular, English figured out how to connect a terminal in the San Francisco Civic Auditorium to the host computer at SRI 30 miles (48 km) away, and also transmitted audio and video between the locations.

He left SRI in 1971 and went to Xerox PARC, where he managed the Office Systems Research Group. While working at PARC, English developed a ball mouse, in which a ball replaced the original set of wheels. It worked similarly to a moveable ball-based mouse device called Rollkugel, which had been developed by Telefunken, Germany, and was offered since 1968 as input device for their computers.

In 1989, he went to work for Sun Microsystems on internationalization efforts.

English died of respiratory failure in San Rafael, California, on July 26, 2020, aged 91.
