= Michael Kudlick =

- Born: December 8, 1934; Washington, D.C.
- Died: February 16, 2008 (aged 73); San Francisco, California
- Resting place: Mount Tamalpais Cemetery
- Education: University of Maryland, MIT
- Awards: 1981 USF Distinguished Teacher Award
- Scientific career
- Workplaces: SRI International's ARC, University of San Francisco

Michael Douglas Kudlick (December 8, 1934 – February 16, 2008) was a computer scientist and professor of computer science, most known for developing the file transfer and mail protocols for ARPANET while working for the Augmentation Research Center at SRI International, and later as a noted professor and academic administrator at the University of San Francisco.

== Early life and education ==
Kudlick earned a bachelor of science from the University of Maryland in 1956. Kudlick then served in the United States Navy. He later earned a Ph.D. from the Massachusetts Institute of Technology in 1966.

== Career ==
After earning his Ph.D. Kudlick worked for Shell Development and later the Augmentation Research Center (ARC) at SRI International. At the ARC he contributed to the development of the computer mouse. He also worked on the ARPANet File Transfer Protocol committee, which established how file transfers work on ARPANET, and its successor, the internet; the standard is RFC542, "File Transfer Protocol for the ARPA Network". Kudlick was also on the Network Mail committee which wrote RFC469.

From 1974 to 1997, Kudlick was a professor of computer science at the University of San Francisco (USF). While there, he served as chair of the computer science department, received USF's Distinguished Teaching award in 1981, and was the adviser to USF's chapter of the Association for Computing Machinery. USF alum Alfred Chuang donated $2.5 million to USF in 2001 to fund the construction of a computer science classroom named for Kudlick.
