= Thierry Bardini =

French sociologist (born 1960s)

Thierry Bardini (born 1960s) is a French sociologist, author of the book Bootstrapping, about Douglas Engelbart. He is a full professor in the Department of Communication at the Université de Montréal, Canada. He is known for his work on innovation and sociology of technology.

== Education and career ==
Bardini holds a degree in agronomy (1986) and his first work was on agriculture production systems. He wrote his PhD thesis on technical systems in agriculture. (Note: BARDINI, T. (1991) Modèle technique et modernisation. Le cas du lait de brebis dans le rayon de Roquefort, 1950-1985 (Université de Paris X: Nanterre, 1991). Lille: A.N.R.T, Université de Lille III, 1991.) He also did fieldwork on the history of agriculture in Venezuela (Note: ARVANITIS, R. & BARDINI, T. (1990) Le rôle de l'ingénieur agronome dans la situation politique de l'agriculture vénézuélienne: 1936-1948. Cahiers des Sciences Humaines, 26, 429-446. ARVANITIS, R. & BARDINI, T. (1992) El papel del ingeniero agrónomo en el contexto político de la agricultura venezolana. IN FREITES, Y. & TEXERA, Y. (Eds.) Tiempos de cambio. La ciencia en Venezuela 1936-1948. Caracas, Fondo Editorial Acta Científica Venezolana.) and on a multi-disciplinary research project around the jack-bean Canavalia ensiformis agriculture and similar topics in Venezuela, (Note: ARVANITIS, R. & BARDINI, T. (1992) Analyse d'un programme multidisciplinaire de recherche par deux méthodes d'analyse des réseaux: le cas du groupe de Recherche sur Canavalia. IN ARVANITIS, R. & GAILLARD, J. (Eds.) Les indicateurs de science pour les pays en développement / Science Indicators for Developing Countries. Paris, Editions de l'ORSTOM.) before working in the United States on innovation diffusion under the direction of Everett Rogers at the University of Southern California Annenberg School for Communication. He then left for Université de Montréal, where he co-directs the Workshop in Radical Empiricism (with Brian Massumi).

== Books ==
In 2000, he published Bootstrapping: Douglas Engelbart, Coevolution, and the Origins of Personal Computing, a book about Douglas Engelbart's career and the rise and fall of the Augmentation Research Center at Stanford Research Institute.

He has published a book titled Junkware in the Posthumanities Series at Minnesota Press in 2011.
