= Bertram Raphael =

American computer scientist (born 1936)

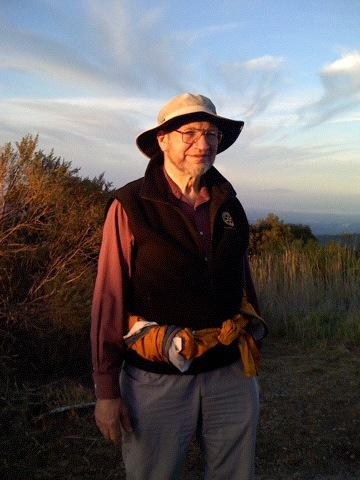
- Born: November 16, 1936 (age 89); New York City, US
- Education: Rensselaer Polytechnic Institute; Brown University; Massachusetts Institute of Technology
- Scientific career
- Fields: Artificial intelligence
- Workplaces: SRI International
- Doctoral advisor: Marvin Minsky
- Website: raphaelconsulting.com

Bertram Raphael (born November 16, 1936) is an American computer scientist known for his contributions to artificial intelligence.

== Early life and education ==
Raphael was born in 1936 in New York City. He received his bachelor's degree in physics from the Rensselaer Polytechnic Institute in 1957, and an MS degree in Applied Math from Brown University in 1959. He was a student of Marvin Minsky at the Massachusetts Institute of Technology and received his PhD in mathematics in 1964.

== Career ==
Raphael started at SRI International in 1964 as a consultant. After completing his Ph.D. at MIT, he was at the University of California, Berkeley for an academic year, and subsequently joined SRI full-time in April 1965. He was a long-time member of SRI's Artificial Intelligence Center, and was its director from 1970 to 1973. While at SRI, he helped invent the A* search algorithm and develop Shakey the robot, which was one of the first projects sponsored by DARPA; Raphael directed work on Shakey from 1970 to 1971. He also co-founded the Journal of Artificial Intelligence.

In 1976, he sold the NLS technology developed by the Augmentation Research Center (ARC), led by Douglas Engelbart, to Tymshare.

From 1980 to 1990 Raphael worked as a research manager at Hewlett Packard. From 1990 to 1997 he helped his wife, Anne, operate Compass Point Travel Inc., a business that she had founded in 1980 in Mountain View, California.

He was a Senior Fulbright Lecturer in Vienna during 1973 and 1974.

A 1971 statement attributed to Raphael, "AI is a collective name for problems which we do not yet know how to solve properly by computer", was identified by Quote Investigator as the earliest known expression of the notion now known as the AI effect.

== Selected publications ==
Books

- The Thinking Computer: Mind Inside Matter (W.H. Freeman & Company, 1976)

Dissertation

- SIR (Semantic Information Retrieval program) on the logical representation of knowledge for question-answering systems (MIT, 1964)

== See also ==
- History of artificial intelligence
