= William F. Talbot =

- Born: October 29, 1904; Loup City, Nebraska
- Died: November 1967 (aged 63)
- Education: State University of Iowa
- Scientific career
- Workplaces: DuPont; Sun Chemical; Office of Strategic Services; Stanford Research Institute; Rubberset Company; Bristol Myers

William Fletcher Talbot (October 29, 1903 – November 1967) was a research chemist and the founding director of SRI International, a position he held from 1946 to 1947.

== Early life and education ==
Born in Loup City, Nebraska in 1903, Talbot received M.S. and Ph.D. degrees from the State University of Iowa.

== Career ==
Initially a teacher, Talbot joined E. I. du Pont as a research chemist. He was then a research chemist for A. D. Little. He was later the technical director of the Sun Chemical Company (formerly the General Printing Ink Company) and president of its Fine Chemicals Division. While on leave from Sun in 1944, he was the assistant director of research and development for the Office of Strategic Services. During his career, he developed melamine resin, a type of plastic used for molding and casting. Talbot held several patents.

Unofficially appointed in September 1946 and officially appointed in January 1947, he was SRI International's first director. He helped establish the organization and set its early priorities. Due to a dispute with Stanford University president Donald Tresidder, he offered his resignation and reluctantly left SRI in December 1947. Talbot believed SRI should seek contracts from governmental organizations (and be what is now considered a defense contractor); Tressider believed the organization should be independent from government interference.

Talbot went on to work for the Rubberset Company and later for Bristol Myers. He died in 1967.
