= Nils John Nilsson =

American computer scientist (1933–2019)

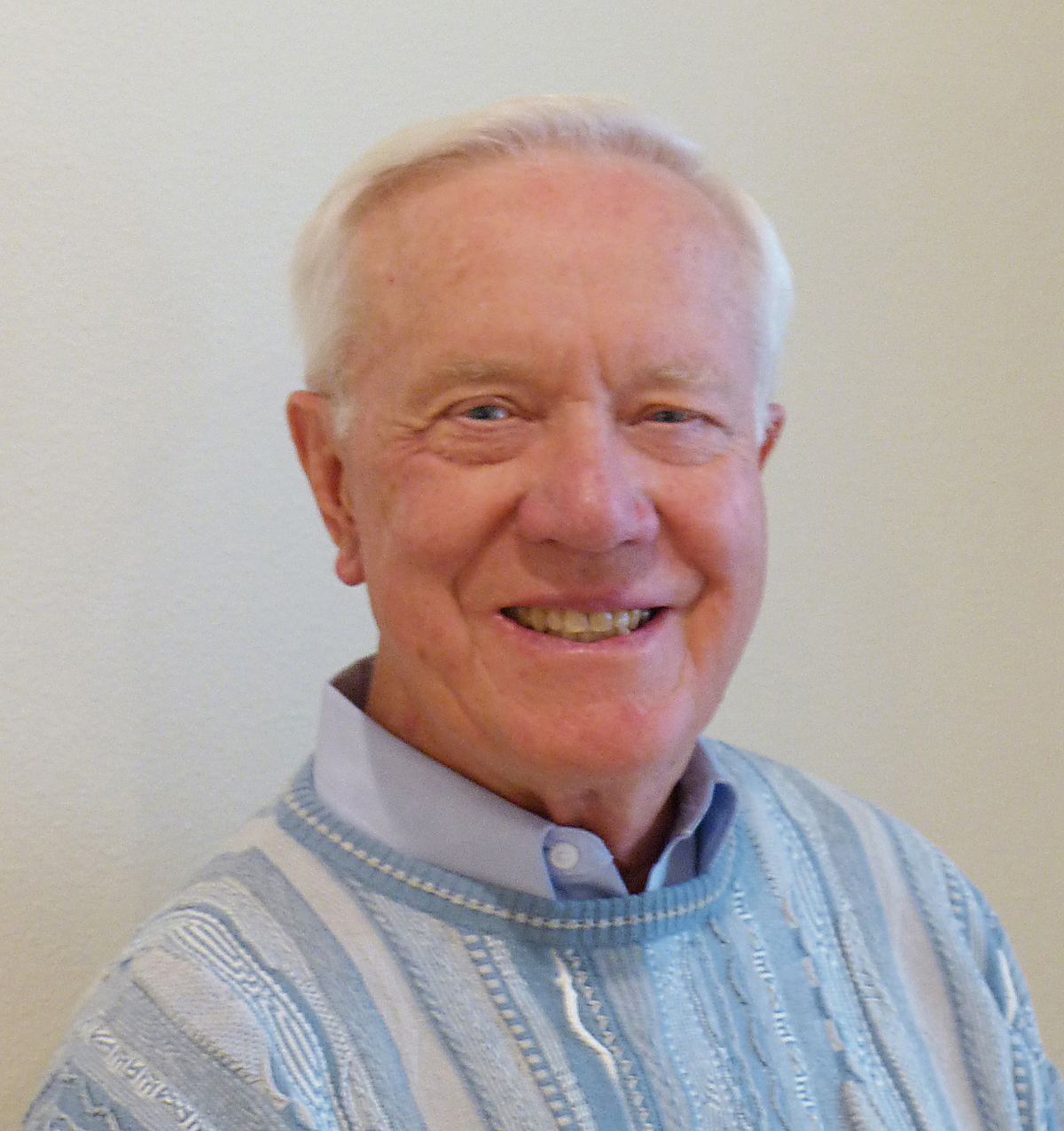
- Nilsson in 2013
- Born: February 6, 1933; Saginaw, Michigan, U.S.
- Died: April 23, 2019 (aged 86); Medford, Oregon, U.S.
- Education: Stanford University
- Scientific career
- Fields: Artificial intelligence
- Workplaces: SRI International; Stanford University
- Thesis: An Application of the Theory of Games to Radar Reception Problems (1958)
- Doctoral advisor: Willis Harman
- Doctoral students: Leslie P. Kaelbling
- Website: ai.stanford.edu/~nilsson/

Nils John Nilsson (February 6, 1933 – April 23, 2019) was an American computer scientist. He was one of the founding researchers in the discipline of artificial intelligence. He was the first Kumagai Professor of Engineering in computer science at Stanford University from 1991 until his retirement. He is particularly known for his contributions to search, planning, knowledge representation, and robotics.

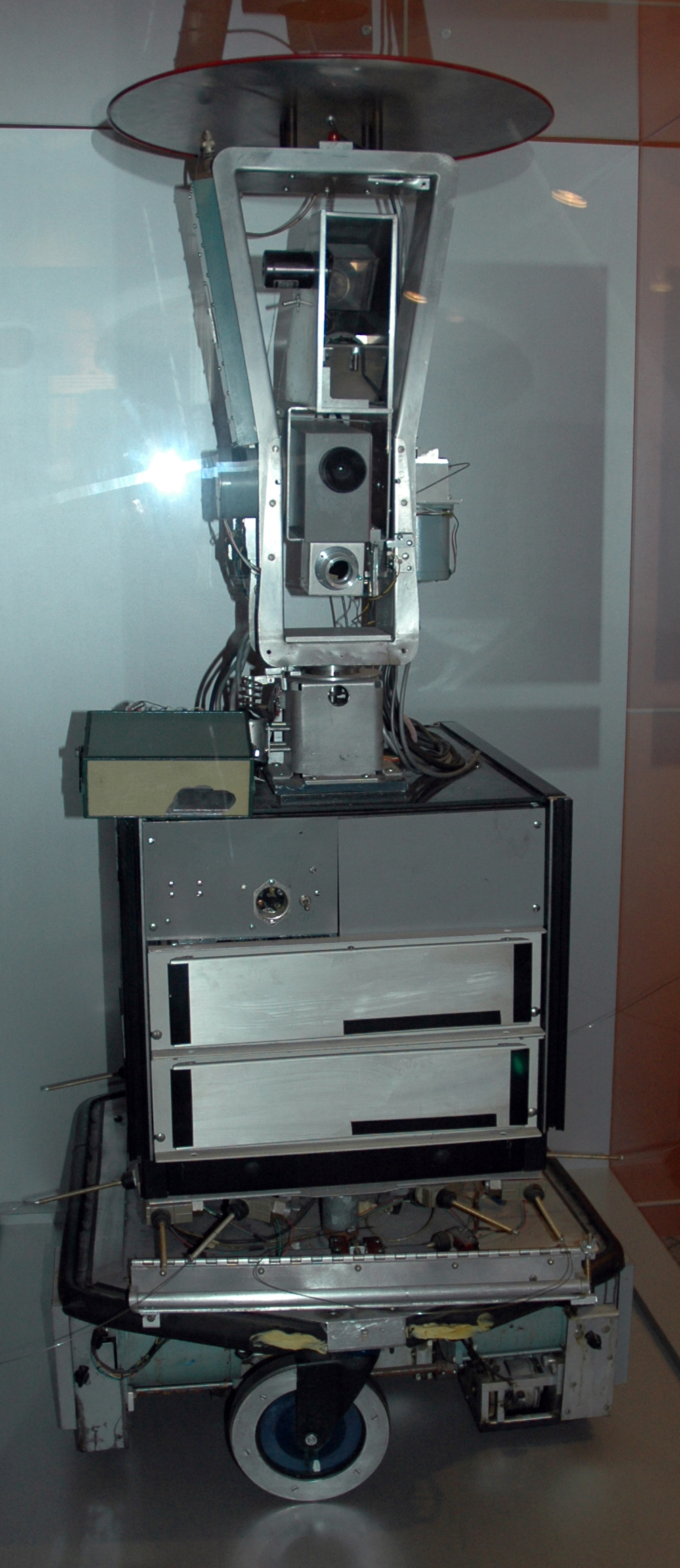
Shakey at the Computer History Museum, Mountain View, California

== Early life and education ==
Nilsson was born in Saginaw, Michigan, in 1933. He received his Ph.D. from Stanford in 1958, and spent much of his career at SRI International, a private research lab spun off from Stanford.

Nilsson served as a lieutenant in the U.S. Air Force from 1958 to 1961; he was stationed at the Rome Air Development Center in Rome, New York.

== Career ==
=== SRI International ===
Starting in 1966, Nilsson, along with Charles A. Rosen and Bertram Raphael, led a research team in the construction of Shakey, a robot that constructed a model of its environment from sensor data, reasoned about that environment to arrive at a plan of action, then carried that plan out by sending commands to its motors. This paradigm has been enormously influential in AI. Textbooks such as Introduction to Artificial Intelligence, Essentials of Artificial Intelligence, and the first edition of Artificial Intelligence: A Modern Approach show this influence in almost every chapter. Although the basic idea of using logical reasoning to decide on actions is due to John McCarthy, Nilsson's group was the first to embody it in a complete agent, along the way inventing the A* search algorithm and founding the field of automated temporal planning. In the latter pursuit, they invented the STRIPS planner, whose action representation is still the basis of many of today's planning algorithms. The subfield of automated temporal planning called classical planning is based on most of the assumptions built into STRIPS.

=== Stanford University ===
In 1985, Nilsson became a faculty member at Stanford University, in the Computer Science Department. He was chair of the department from 1985 to 1990. He was the Kumagai Professor of Engineering from the foundation of the Chair in around 1991 until his retirement, and remained Kumagai Professor Emeritus until his death.

He was the fourth President of the AAAI (1982–83) and a Founding Fellow of that organization. Nilsson wrote or coauthored several books on AI, including two that have been especially widely read—Principles of Artificial Intelligence (1982) and Logical Foundations of Artificial Intelligence (1987).

== Awards and memberships ==
In 2011, Nilsson was inducted into IEEE Intelligent Systems' AI's Hall of Fame for the "significant contributions to the field of AI and intelligent systems".

== Personal life ==
On July 19, 1958, Nilsson married Karen Braucht, with whom he had two children. Braucht died in 1991. In 1992 he married Grace Abbott, who had four children from a previous marriage.

Nilsson died on April 23, 2019, at his home in Medford, Oregon, at the age of 86.

== Selected publications ==
- — (1982) [1980], Principles of Artificial Intelligence, Springer-Verlag, ISBN 978-3-540-11340-9. In the early 1980s, it was one of the first Western textbooks on AI to be translated into Chinese and published in China.
- Genesereth, Michael; — (1987) [1976], Logical Foundations of Artificial Intelligence, Morgan Kaufmann, ISBN 978-1-493-30598-8.
- — (1990), The Mathematical Foundations of Learning Machines, Morgan Kaufmann, ISBN 978-1-558-60123-9.
- — (1998), Artificial Intelligence: A New Synthesis, Morgan Kaufmann, ISBN 978-1-558-60467-4.
- — (2009), The Quest for Artificial Intelligence, Cambridge University Press, ISBN 978-0-521-11639-8.
  - Free Web version (pagination differs)
  - 2012 corrections and updates (linked from Nilsson's page for the book), not integrated into either version
- — (2014), Understanding Beliefs, MIT Press, ISBN 978-0-262-52643-2.

== See also ==
- Morgan Kaufmann Publishers
