= Philip J. Quigley =

Philip J. Quigley is the retired chief executive officer of Pacific Telesis Corporation. He has been on the board of directors of Wells Fargo & Company, SRI International, and several other Fortune 500 companies.
