= Samuel Armacost =

American business executive

Samuel H. Armacost
- Born: March 29, 1939 (age 87)
- Education: Denison University; Stanford University
- Employers: BankAmerica Corporation; SRI International; Chevron Corporation

Samuel Henry Armacost (born March 29, 1939) is an American business executive who was formerly the president, director, and CEO of BankAmerica Corporation. He has chaired or served on the boards of directors of major organizations such as SRI International and Chevron Corporation.

== Education ==
Armacost holds a BA in economics from Denison University and an MBA from Stanford University.

== Career ==
President, director and chief executive officer of BankAmerica Corporation from 1981 until 1986, where his tenure was controversial.

Managing director of Merrill Lynch Capital Markets from 1987 until 1990. Managing director of Weiss, Peck & Greer L.L.C. from 1990 until 1998.

He was the chairman of SRI International, formerly Stanford Research Institute, an independent research, technology development and commercialization organization, from 1998 to 2010, and has been a member of the board of directors since 1981.

He has also been the lead director of Chevron Corporation since 1982. Other board of director positions include Callaway Golf Company, Del Monte Foods, and Exponent Inc. He is a member of the Advisory Board of the California Academy of Sciences. From 1971 to 1972, he served as an advisor to the State Department's Office of Monetary Affairs.
