= Norman Winarsky =

American author and angel investor

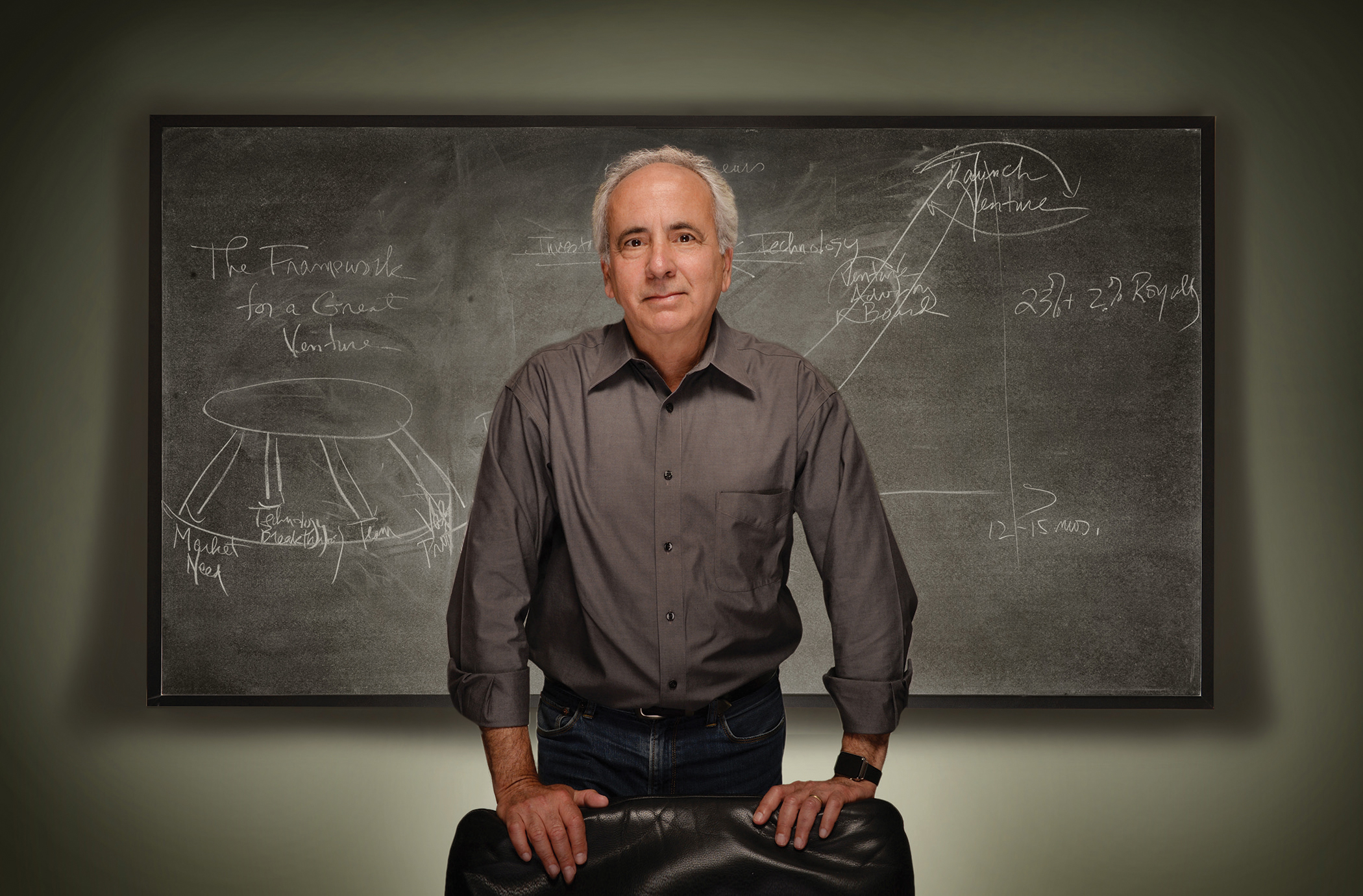
- Norman Winarsky at SRI International headquarters Menlo Park, CA in 2015.
- Education: University of Chicago
- Scientific career
- Workplaces: Institute for Advanced Study; Sarnoff Corporation; SRI International; Stanford University

Norman Winarsky is an American author and angel investor. He was the President of SRI Ventures at SRI International. He is a founder of SRI's venture process, which includes venture and license incubation, seed funding, the Entrepreneur-In-Residence program, and the nVention venture forum.

Winarsky was a co-founder and board member of Siri, which was spun out from SRI in January 2008 and acquired by Apple Inc. in 2010. He is author of If You Really Want to Change the World: A Guide to Creating, Building, and Sustaining Breakthrough Ventures. He is a Lecturer at Stanford Graduate School of Business, Venture Partner at Relay Ventures, and an Advisor to Health2047.

He was a visiting scholar at Stanford, chairman of the University of Chicago Visiting Committee for the Physical Sciences, and a member of the National Academy Committee on Forecasting Future Disruptive Technologies. He was also a National Science Foundation Fellow, an invited member of the mathematics department of the Institute for Advanced Study in Princeton, New Jersey, and an assistant professor at SUNY at Albany.

In 2000, Norman and his team received an Emmy Award for outstanding achievement in technological advancement. In addition, he has received RCA's highest honor, the Sarnoff Award.

Norman graduated with a B.A., M.S., and Ph.D. in Mathematics from the University of Chicago, and was awarded Summa Cum Laude and Phi Beta Kappa. In addition, he was awarded the Paul J. Cohen award for the outstanding student in Mathematics.

== Early life and education ==
Winarsky earned a Bachelor of Arts in 1969, a Master of Science in 1970, and a Ph.D. in 1974, all in mathematics and from the University of Chicago. His Ph.D. thesis, "Reducibility of Principal Series Representations of p-Adic Groups" was completed under the advisement of Paul Sally. From 1969 to 1974, Winarsky was a National Science Foundation Fellow, and was a member of the mathematics department of the Institute for Advanced Study in Princeton, New Jersey from 1971 to 1972, and the summers from 1973 to 1976.

== Career ==
After receiving his Ph.D., Winarsky was initially an assistant professor of mathematics at the State University of New York. In 1976, Winarsky joined RCA Laboratories, later known as Sarnoff Corporation.

Winarsky has been SRI International's vice president, Ventures and Strategic Business Development, since November 2001; in this position, he is responsible for licensing and spin-offs.

Since 2010, he has been a visiting scholar at Stanford University, researching regions of innovation.

== Awards and memberships ==
1. In 1984, Winarsky received the Sarnoff Award, RCA Laboratories' highest honor, for "development of the physical understanding and computer software for simulating electron trajectories in picture tubes". In 2011, he received an alumni service award from the University of Chicago.
