= InterNIC =

Organization responsible for Internet domain name allocations (1972–1998)

- Successor: ICANN; ARIN
- Formation: 1972
- Founder: Elizabeth J. Feinler
- Dissolved: September 18, 1998
- Purpose: Manage Internet protocol numbers and Domain Name System root
- Parent organization: Stanford Research Institute (until 1991); Network Solutions (from 1991)
- Website: internic.net
- Formerly called: Network Information Center (NIC)

InterNIC, known as the Network Information Center (NIC) until 1993, was the organization primarily responsible for Domain Name System (DNS) domain name allocations and X.500 directory services. From its inception in 1972 until October 1, 1991, it was run by the Stanford Research Institute, now known as SRI International, and led by Jake Feinler. From October 1991 until September 18, 1998, it was run by Network Solutions. Thereafter, the responsibility was assumed by the Internet Corporation for Assigned Names and Numbers (ICANN).

It was accessed through the domain name internic.net, with email, FTP and World Wide Web services run at various times by SRI, Network Solutions, Inc., and AT&T. This website is still active today, operated by ICANN, and currently provides reference documents and information related to domain registration. The InterNIC also coordinated the IP address space, including performing IP address management for North America prior to the formation of ARIN. InterNIC is a registered service mark of the U.S. Department of Commerce. The use of the term is licensed to the Internet Corporation for Assigned Names and Numbers (ICANN).

== SRI ==
The first central authority to coordinate the operation of the network was the Network Information Center (NIC). The NIC was based in Doug Engelbart's lab, the Augmentation Research Center, at the Stanford Research Institute (now SRI International) in Menlo Park, California.

In 1972, Elizabeth J. Feinler, better known as Jake, became principal investigator of the project.

The Internet Assigned Numbers Authority (IANA) assigned the numbers, while the NIC published them to the rest of the network. Jon Postel fulfilled the role of manager of IANA, in addition to his role as the RFC Editor, until his death in 1998.

The NIC provided reference service to users (initially over the phone and by physical mail), maintained and published a directory of people (the "white pages"), a resource handbook (the "yellow pages", a list of services) and the protocol handbook. After the Network Operations Center at Bolt, Bernek and Newman brought new hosts onto the network, the NIC registered names, provided access control for terminals, audit trail and billing information, and distributed Request for Comments (RFCs). Feinler, working with Steve Crocker, Jon Postel, Joyce Reynolds and other members of the Network Working Group (NWG), developed RFCs into the official set of technical notes for the ARPANET and later the Internet. The NIC provided the first links to online documents using the NLS Journal system developed at SRI's Augmentation Research Center.

On the ARPANET, hosts were given names to be used in place of numeric addresses. Owners of new hosts sent email to HOSTSMASTER@SRI-NIC.ARPA to request an address. A file named HOSTS.TXT was distributed by the NIC and manually installed on each host on the network to provide a mapping between these names and their corresponding network address. As the network grew, this became increasingly cumbersome. A technical solution came in the form of the Domain Name System, designed by Paul Mockapetris.

The Defense Data Network Network Information Center (DDN-NIC) at SRI handled all registration services, including the top-level domains mil, gov, edu, org, net, com and us. DDN-NIC also performed root nameserver administration and Internet number assignments under a United States Department of Defense contract starting in 1984.

== Network Solutions ==
In 1990, the Internet Activities Board proposed changes to the centralized NIC/IANA arrangement. The Defense Information Systems Agency (DISA) awarded the administration and maintenance of DDN-NIC, which had been managed by SRI since 1972, to Government Systems, Inc (GSI), which subcontracted it to the small private-sector firm Network Solutions.

On October 1, 1991, the NIC services were moved from a DECSYSTEM-20 machine at SRI to a Sun Microsystems SPARCserver running SunOS 4.1 at GSI in Chantilly, Virginia.

By the 1990s, most of the growth of the Internet was in the non-defense sector, and even outside the United States. Therefore, the US Department of Defense would no longer fund registration services outside of the mil domain.

The National Science Foundation started a competitive bidding process in 1992; subsequently, in 1993, NSF created the Internet Network Information Center, known as InterNIC, to extend and coordinate directory and database services and information services for the NSFNET; and provide registration services for non-military Internet participants. NSF awarded the contract to manage InterNIC to three organizations; Network Solutions provided registration services, AT&T provided directory and database services, and General Atomics provided information services. General Atomics was disqualified from the contract in December 1994 after a review found their services not conforming to the standards of its contract. General Atomics' InterNIC functions were assumed by AT&T.

=== Inappropriate domain names ===
Beginning in 1996, Network Solutions rejected domain names containing English language words on a "restricted list" through an automated filter. Applicants whose domain names were rejected received an email containing the notice: "Network Solutions has a right founded in the First Amendment to the U.S. Constitution to refuse to register, and thereby publish, on the Internet registry of domain names words that it deems to be inappropriate." Domain names such as "shitakemushrooms.com" would be rejected, but the domain name "shit.com" was active since it had been registered before 1996.

Network Solutions eventually allowed domain names containing the words on a case-by-case basis, after manually reviewing the names for obscene intent. This profanity filter was never enforced by the government and its use was not continued by ICANN when it took over governance of the distribution of domain names to the public.

== Transfer to ARIN and ICANN ==
The InterNIC project included Internet IP number assignment, ASN assignment, and reverse DNS zone (in-addr.arpa) management tasks until December 1997 when the American Registry for Internet Numbers (ARIN) came into operation. At that time, responsibility for these tasks was transferred by the National Science Foundation from the InterNIC project to ARIN via modification of the cooperative agreement with Network Solutions.

The InterNIC Directory and Database services provided by AT&T were discontinued on March 31, 1998, after their cooperative agreement with NSF expired.

In 1998, both IANA and InterNIC project were reorganized under the control of the Internet Corporation for Assigned Names and Numbers (ICANN), a California non-profit corporation contracted by the US Department of Commerce to manage a number of Internet-related tasks. The role of operating the DNS was privatized, and opened up to competition, while the central management of name allocations would be awarded on a contract tender basis. In July 2010, the IAB and Number Resource Organization agreed that ICANN should perform the in-addr.arpa zone technical management tasks, and this transition to ICANN was completed in February 2011.

== In popular culture ==
In Uplink: Hacker Elite, a database of InterNIC is featured. It can also be hacked in-game and it ironically has no security.

== See also ==
- Regional Internet registry
- APNIC
- LACNIC
- AFRINIC
- RIPE NCC
- Autonomous system (Internet)
