= Artificial Intelligence Center =

American computer laboratory

SRI Artificial Intelligence Center
- SRI logo
- Type: Private
- Industry: Artificial intelligence
- Founded: 1966
- Founder: Charles Rosen
- Key people: C. Raymond Perrault (Director)
- Services: Research
- Parent: SRI International
- Website: www.sri.com/about/organization/information-computing-sciences/aic archived

The Artificial Intelligence Center is a laboratory in the Information and Computing Sciences Division of SRI International. It was founded in 1966 by Charles Rosen and studies artificial intelligence.

One of their early projects was Shakey the Robot, the first general-purpose mobile robot. More recently, the center funded early development of CALO and Siri. The center has also provided the military with various technology.

== See also ==
- Augmentation Research Center
