= William P. Sommers =

American business executive (1933–2007)

- Born: July 22, 1933; Detroit, Michigan
- Died: January 7, 2007 (aged 73); Ponte Vedra Beach, Florida
- Education: University of Michigan
- Spouse: Josie Sommers
- Scientific career
- Workplaces: Booz Allen Hamilton; Iameter; SRI International

William Paul "Bill" Sommers (July 22, 1933 – January 7, 2007) was an engineer and business executive of several companies, including Booz Allen Hamilton, Iameter, and SRI International.

== Education ==
Sommers was born in Detroit in 1933. He held a Bachelor of Science, a Master of Science in Engineering, and a Ph.D. in engineering and aeronautical engineering, all from the University of Michigan. Sommers donated a significant amount to his alma mater.

== Career ==
Sommers worked at Booz Allen Hamilton for 29 years. He was then executive vice president of Iameter, a health care cost containment company. From 1993 to 1998, he was the CEO of SRI International. While at SRI International, he focused on cost cutting to bring the organization back to profitability.
