= Mariann Byerwalter =

American businesswoman

- Education: Stanford University; Harvard University
- Scientific career
- Workplaces: Franklin Resources; Stanford University; SRI International

Mariann Byerwalter is Chairman of the Board of Directors of Pacific Life Insurance Company, where she has been a director since 2005. Byerwalter is the Lead Independent Director of Franklin Resources Inc., and has served as a director since 2015. She was Interim President and CEO of Stanford Hospital and Clinics from January 2016 to July 2016. She served on the Board of Directors at Stanford Hospital and Clinics (now Stanford HealthCare) from 1999 through 2024 and was Chairman of the Board of Directors from 2006 through 2013.

Byerwalter served as Chairman of the Board at SRI International from 2014 to 2020, and as a director from 1997 through December 2023. She served three terms on the Stanford University Board of Trustees between 1992 and 2012. Byerwalter served on the Board of Directors of Lucile Packard Children's Hospital from 1994 until 1996, and from 2000 through 2023. She was a Trustee for SchwabFunds from 2000 to 2015, chairing the Governance Committee for four years, and has served on several other private, public and non-profit boards over the last three decades.

Byerwalter was Chief Financial Officer and Vice President for Business Affairs of Stanford University from 1996 to 2000, and Special Assistant to the President through 2001. Prior to this, she was co-founder and partner of America First Financial Corporation, which raised funds to purchase and turn-around failed savings and loans from the government. Byerwalter was the Chief Operating Officer, Chief Financial Officer and a Director of AmericaFirst Eureka Holdings, the holding company for EurekaBank, a publicly traded institution. She was the Chief Financial Officer of EurekaBank from 1993 to 1996, and was a member of the EurekaBank Board of Directors from 1988 until the company was sold to Bay View Capital in 1998.

== Education ==
Before earning her Masters Degree in Business Administration (MBA) from Harvard Business School in 1984, Byerwalter earned a Bachelors Degree in Economics and Political Science/Public Policy from Stanford University in 1982. She was elected as one of Stanford’s student body presidents from 1981 – 1982. At commencement, she was the recipient of the Chancellor JE Wallace Sterling Award.

== Awards ==
Byerwalter was selected as an Outstanding Director for 2014 by the San Francisco Business Times and Silicon Valley Business Journal. She was named a Distinguished Honoree for the 2014 Harvard Business School “50 Years of Women at HBS” gala. She was recognized in the San Francisco Business Times’ “Most Influential Business Women in the Bay Area” for 2001, 2002, and 2017 and received the 1998 Financial Woman of the Year Award from the Financial Women’s Association of San Francisco.

Byerwalter received the 2015 Stanford University Gold Spike Award, one of the University’s highest honors for exceptional volunteer service and leadership. She was also awarded the 2015 Stanford Medical School’s Dean’s Medal, given to individuals whose scientific, medical, humanitarian or other contributions have significantly advanced the mission of Stanford Medicine.
