= Thomas J. Furst =

- Education: Villanova University; College of William & Mary
- Occupation: Chief financial officer

Thomas J. Furst is the senior vice president and chief financial officer of SRI International, a position he has held since 1996. He was the director of the Sarnoff Corporation until its absorption into SRI.

== Early life and education ==
Furst earned bachelor of science in economics from Villanova University and a Master of Business Administration from the College of William & Mary.

== Career ==
Furst held management positions in finance with HRB-Singer and RCA. He was then vice president of financial operations at PRC.

In 1991, Furst served as the chief financial executive of Booz Allen Hamilton's Worldwide Technology Business. In 1996, he became SRI International's chief financial officer.
