= James J. Tietjen =

- Born: March 29, 1933; New York City, New York
- Died: August 10, 2016 (aged 83); Belle Mead, New Jersey
- Education: Pennsylvania State University; Iona College
- Scientific career
- Workplaces: SRI International; RCA Corporation

James Joseph Tietjen (March 29, 1933 – August 10, 2016) was dean of the Wesley J. Howe School of Technology Management at Stevens Institute of Technology from 1996 to 2000, and was president and CEO of SRI International from 1990 to 1994.

== Education ==
Tietjen earned a B.S. in chemistry from Iona College, and an MS and a Ph.D. in physical chemistry from Pennsylvania State University.

== Career ==
Tietjen was an executive of the David Sarnoff Research Center (previously known as RCA Laboratories) from 1985 to 1990. Tietjen also served as a director of C-COR and SynQuest.

From 1990 to 1994, he was the president and CEO of SRI International. From July 1996 to August 2000, he was the dean of the Wesley J. Howe School of Technology Management at Stevens Institute of Technology. He died at his home in Belle Mead, New Jersey on August 10, 2016, at the age of 83.
