= Sun Chemical =

American producer of printing inks and pigments

- Type: Private
- Industry: Chemical
- Founded: 1945; 81 years ago
- Headquarters: Parsippany-Troy Hills, U.S.
- Products: Inks, coatings, pigments, electronic materials, brand protection
- Revenue: $3,500,000,000 USD
- Number of employees: 20,000 (2018)
- Website: sunchemical.com

Sun Chemical is one of the world's largest producer of printing inks and pigments and is located in Parsippany-Troy Hills, New Jersey. It was incorporated in 1945. The company has its roots as the Lorilleux & Cie. Paris in 1818, but was incorporated under the Sun name in 1945. The company operates the Daniel J. Carlick Technical Center in Carlstadt, New Jersey.

Sun Chemical is a member of the DIC Corporation group of companies based in Japan. The company provides materials to packaging, publication, coatings, plastics, cosmetics and other industrial markets, including electronic materials, functional and specialty coatings, brand protection and product authentication technologies.

== Sites ==
=== Africa ===
==== South Africa ====
In South Africa the chemical company trades under the name Sun Chemical S.A(Pty)Ltd. There is 1 manufacturing site and 13 inplant sites.

===== Manufacturing Sites =====
- Prospecton, Kwazulu-Natal - this site has two factories, manufacturing liquid inks and paste inks.

===== Inplant sites =====
- Gauteng - 4 inplants
- KwaZulu-Natal - 6 inplants
- North West - 1 inplant
- Western Cape - 2 inplants
