= Jesse E. Hobson =

- Born: May 2, 1911; Marshall, Indiana
- Died: November 5, 1970 (aged 59); Seattle, Washington
- Awards: IEEE Fellow
- Scientific career
- Institutions: SRI International; Armour Research Foundation

Jesse Edward Hobson (May 2, 1911 – November 5, 1970) was an American electrical engineer and the director of SRI International from 1947 to 1955. Prior to SRI, he was the director of the Armour Research Foundation.

== Early life and education ==
Hobson was born in Marshall, Indiana. He received bachelor's and master's degrees in electrical engineering from Purdue University and a PhD in electrical engineering from the California Institute of Technology. Hobson was also selected as a nationally outstanding engineer.

Hobson married Jessie Eugertha Bell on March 26, 1939, and they had five children.

== Awards and memberships ==
Hobson was named an IEEE Fellow in 1948.
