= Harrison Price =

American economist (1921–2010)

Harrison A. Price
- Born: May 17, 1921; Oregon City, Oregon
- Died: August 15, 2010 (aged 89); Pomona, California
- Occupation: Economist
- Known for: Feasibility Studies for Amusement/Theme Parks

Harrison Alan "Buzz" Price (May 17, 1921 – August 15, 2010) was an American research economist specializing in how people spend their leisure time and resources. Price guided Walt Disney in the siting and development of Disneyland in Southern California and of Walt Disney World in Central Florida.

== Early life and education ==
Price was born in Oregon City, Oregon on May 17, 1921, and moved with his family to San Diego in 1930. Price earned his undergraduate degree in 1942 from the California Institute of Technology, where he majored in mechanical engineering. He served in the United States Army during World War II and then spent three years as a sales engineer in South America before returning to the United States to attend Stanford University, where he earned a Master of Business Administration degree in 1951.

== Career ==
Price's method of leisure-time economic analysis combined aspects of architecture and planning, along with economics and sociology. While with the Stanford Research Institute (now SRI International), Price worked for Walt Disney starting in 1953, producing 150 studies regarding the development of potential theme parks. Price considered several locations in Southern California for the company's first theme park, suggesting that Disneyland be located in Anaheim after considering accessibility, climate and projected profitability. Price performed research in the 1960s for a Disney park to be located on the East Coast, Price considered prospective locations in Florida, New York City and Washington, D.C. before deciding that the Orlando, Florida area would be the preferable site for Walt Disney World given its mild winters. He also helped in the selection of Chiba, Japan for the site of Tokyo Disneyland. Michael Eisner credited Price with being "as much responsible for the success of the Walt Disney Co. as anybody except Walt Disney himself".

Price went into business for himself and formed Economics Research Associates in 1958, which he sold off in 1969. In 1978, he established the Harrison Price Company. As a consultant, Price advised the developers of the 1964 New York World's Fair in New York and the 1984 Louisiana World Exposition, as well as for theme parks such as Busch Gardens, Knott's Berry Farm, SeaWorld and Six Flags. He was one of the founders of the California Institute of the Arts, created based on a concept of Walt Disney that became the first degree-granting institution of higher learning in the United States created specifically for students of both the visual and the performing arts.

In 2004, Price published an autobiography titled Walt's Revolution!: By the Numbers.

His brother-in-law was conductor Robert Shaw.

== Death ==
A resident of Pomona, California, Price died there at age 89 on August 15, 2010, due to anemia. He was survived by his wife, the former Ann Shaw, as well as by two daughters, two sons, nine grandchildren and two great-grandchildren.

== Awards ==
Award	Title	Year
Lifetime Achievement	Themed Entertainment Association	1994
Hall of Fame	International Association of Amusement Parks and Attractions	1995
Disney Legend	Walt Disney Company	2003
