= Jeff Rulifson =

American computer scientist

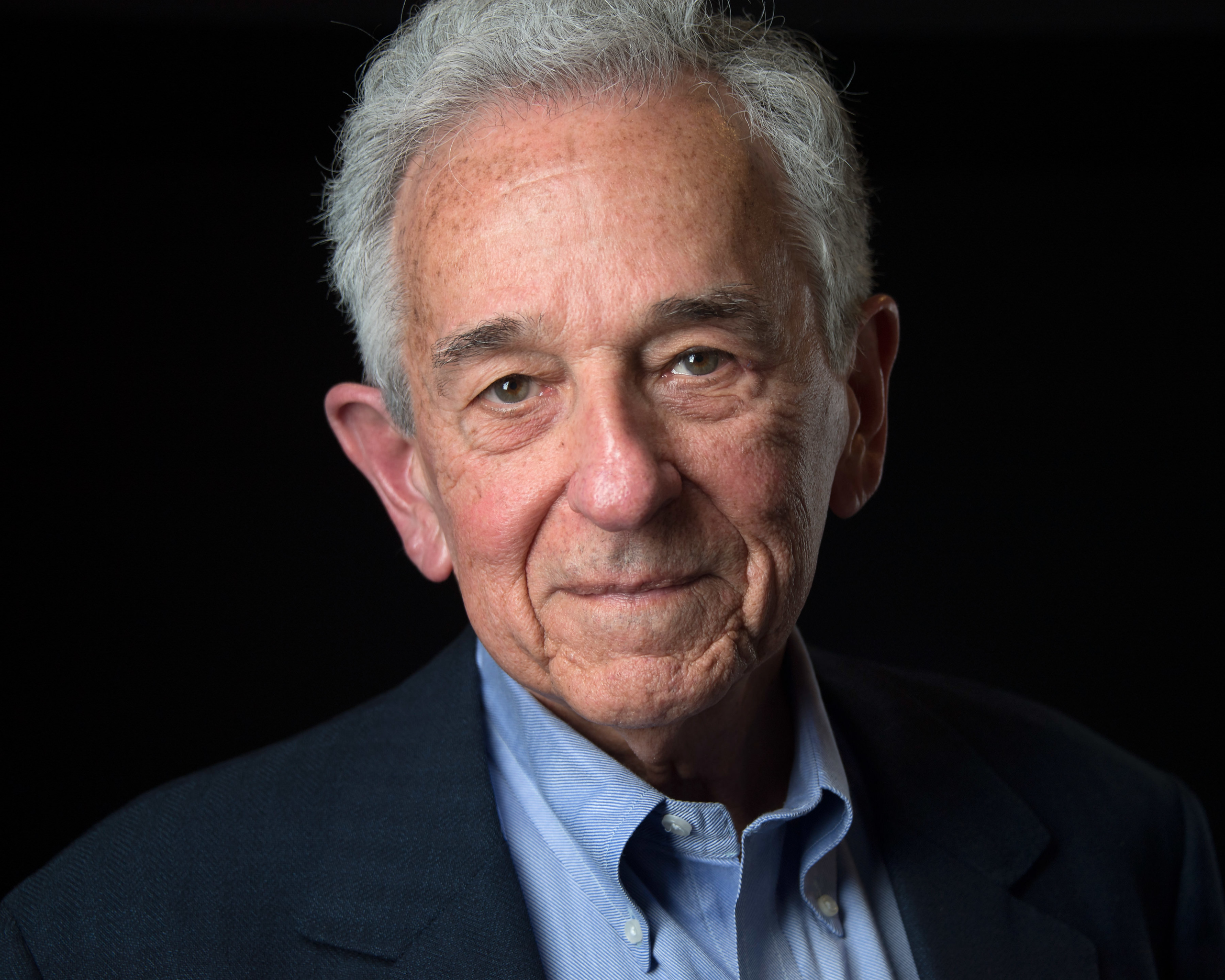
- Jeff Rulifson in 2008
- Born: August 20, 1941 (age 85)
- Education: University of Washington; Stanford University
- Known for: Development of the oN-Line System (NLS)
- Scientific career
- Fields: Computer science
- Workplaces: Stanford Research Institute; Xerox PARC; ROLM; Sun Microsystems; Syntelligence

Johns Frederick (Jeff) Rulifson (born August 20, 1941) is an American computer scientist.

== Early life and education ==
Johns Frederick Rulifson was born August 20, 1941, in Bellefontaine, Ohio. His father was Erwin Charles Rulifson and mother was Virginia Helen Johns. Rulifson married Janet Irving on June 8, 1963, and had two children. He received a B.S. in mathematics from the University of Washington in 1966. Rulifson earned a Ph.D. in computer science from Stanford University in 1973.

== Career ==
Rulifson joined the Augmentation Research Center, at the Stanford Research Institute (now SRI International) in 1966, working on a form of software called “timesharing”. He led the software team that implemented the oN-Line System (NLS), a system that foreshadowed many future developments in modern computing and networking. Specifically, Rulifson developed the command language for the NLS, among other features. His first job was to create the first display-based on the CDC 3100, and the programs he wrote included the first online editor. He also redesigned its file structure. Rulifson was also lead programmer and wrote the program and demonstration files for the first public demonstration of the computer mouse in 1968. He was also the chief programmer of the first use of hypertext. Although Douglas Engelbart was the founder and leader of ARC, Rulifson's innovative programming was essential to the realization of Engelbart's vision. Rulifson was also involved in the development of NIL. Rulifson was the SRI's representative to the "network working group" in 1968, which led to the first connection on the ARPANET. He described the Decode-Encode Language (DEL), which was designed to allow remote use of NLS over ARPANET. Although never used, the idea was small "programs" would be down-loaded to enhance user interaction. This concept was fully developed in Sun Microsystems's Java programming language almost 30 years later, as applets. Simultaneously, he was involved in the development of the AI programming language QA4. This system was used for the planning done by Shakey, one of the first robots.

He left SRI to join the System Sciences Laboratory (SSL) within Xerox PARC in 1973. Here he began work on personal computing and the creation of local networks. One of his first actions was to develop the concept for the desktop icon. By 1978 he was the manager of the center's Office Research Group, where he introduced the use of interdisciplinary scholars into the group's work. Specifically, he was the first computer scientist to begin working alongside anthropologists, hiring several at Xerox to improve their use of field research and enter the field of social science research.

At PARC, he worked on implementing distributed office systems. In 1980, he worked for ROLM as an engineering manager and joined Syntelligence, an artificial intelligence applications vendor in Sunnyvale, California, in 1985. He began working for Sun Microsystems Laboratories in 1987, and held positions including as a director of engineering, technology development, and research groups. He then managed Ivan Sutherland's lab from 2003 until his retirement. He is an emeritus board member of the Doug Engelbart Institute and Chairman of The Open Group.

Jeff Rulifsons papers and research from 1956 to 1997 are held at the Computer History Museum, with a guide to his work entitled Guide to the Jeff Rulifson papers, written by Bo Doub, Kim Hayden, and Sara Chabino Lott.

== Awards ==
In 1990, Rulifson won the Association for Computing Machinery's Software System Award for implementing groundbreaking innovations such as hypertext, outline processors, and video conferencing. In 1994, he was inducted as a Fellow of the Association for Computing Machinery, for his “pioneering work on augmenting human intellect with hypertext, outline processors, and video conferencing.” In 2006 Rulifson was named to the SRI International Hall of Fame.
