= Augmentation Research Center =

Computing research institute

- Company type: Private
- Industry: Computer software Computer hardware
- Founded: 1960s
- Founder: Douglas Engelbart
- Parent: SRI International

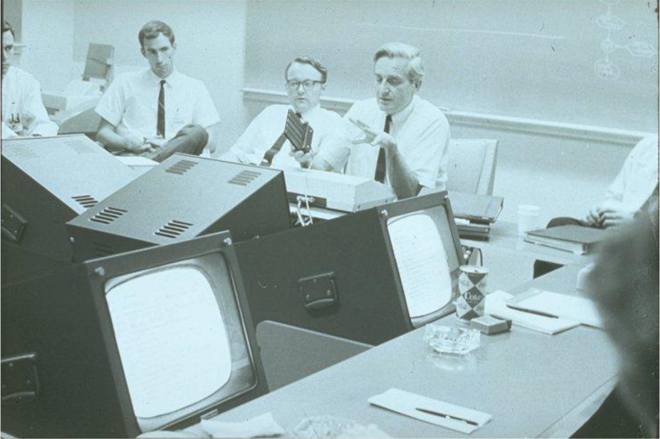
Don Andrews, Bill English, and Doug Engelbart at SRI's Augmentation Research Center during a meeting with sponsors of the program in 1969

SRI International's Augmentation Research Center (ARC) was founded in the 1960s by electrical engineer Douglas Engelbart to develop and experiment with new tools and techniques for collaboration and information processing.

The main product to come out of ARC was the revolutionary oN-Line System, better known by its abbreviation, NLS. ARC is also known for the invention of the "computer mouse" pointing device, and its role in the early formation of the Internet.

Engelbart recruited workers and ran the organization until the late 1970s when the project was commercialized and sold to Tymshare, which was eventually purchased by McDonnell Douglas.

== Beginnings ==
Some early ideas by Douglas Engelbart were developed in 1959 funded by the Air Force Office of Scientific Research (now Rome Laboratory). They focused on methods of improving human intellectual capacity through the use of computers, specifically using interactivity. Ideas proposed center on aligning computer interfaces with the human brain by using displays and "other transducers". Further refinement of these ideas led to a March 10, 1960 essay Man-Machine Intelligent-Team Research where Engelbart breaks human cognition into "Activity Units", with an information-handling and materials-handling facility. He envisions information and material/objects freely flowing in and out, with a constant exchange of information between facilities. Engelbart takes this idea of "Activity Units" and made an expended functional model for implementation into a computer, looping into his cognition theory processors, displays, storage, and other discrete components. By October, 1962, a finalized framework document titled Augmenting Human Intellect: A Conceptual Framework was published which fully defined his theories dating back to a 1959 collection of notes.

J. C. R. Licklider, the first director of the United States Department of Defense's Advanced Research Project Agency (DARPA) Information Processing Techniques Office (IPTO), funded the project in early 1963. First experiments were done trying to connect a display at SRI to the massive one-of-a-kind AN/FSQ-32 computer at the System Development Corporation in Santa Monica, California.

== NASA funding ==
NASA began to provide major funding at the behest of Robert Taylor in 1964. A custom graphical workstation was built around a commercial computer, the CDC 160A, and a CDC 3100, which handled a single user at a time. In 1965, Taylor became IPTO director, leading to increased funding. In 1968 an SDS 940 computer running the Berkeley Timesharing System allowed multiple users as part of the oN-Line System (NLS).

The project was first called ARNAS after the sponsors. For a few years it was then called the Augmented Human Intellect Research Center, which got shortened to the Augmentation Research Center around 1969.

== The Mother of All Demos ==
During a 90-minute session at the Fall Joint Computer Conference in December 1968, Engelbart, Bill English, Jeff Rulifson and other ARC staffers presented their work with the NLS in a live demonstration, including real-time video conferencing, windowed task management, and interactive editing in an era when batch processing was still the paradigm for using computers. This was later called "the Mother of All Demos".

== Further NLS Development ==
ARC continued the development the NLS after its appearance at the 1968 Fall Joint Computer Conference, largely in support of existing NASA and ARPA contracts. This includes a 1969 study for the Rome Air Development Center on using NLS-derived technologies for improved management efficiency and a more general 1972 report for NASA detailing overall research progress. The NLS would continue development until its eventual spinoff to Tymshare.

== Reference library service ==
Engelbart had volunteered ARC to provide the first reference library service on the ARPANET while it was being designed. The first message sent on ARPANET was between the ARC computer and UCLA. Larry Roberts continued to fund the ARC through DARPA IPTO until he left in 1974. The library service evolved into the Internet Network Information Center managed by Elizabeth J. Feinler. Bertram Raphael was put in charge of the project in 1976.

== Sale to Tymshare ==
The technology was sold to Tymshare in 1977, with 20 members of the former SRI group (including Engelbart) becoming Tymshare employees. Only about three or four people were left to continue the NIC, although this group grew quickly along with the Internet. Jon Postel left in 1977 to join the Information Sciences Institute. A number of early participants moved on to careers at Xerox, Hewlett-Packard, Apple Computer, Sun Microsystems, and other leading computer companies.

Tymshare renamed the software Augment and offered it as a commercial service via its new Office Automation Division. At Tymshare, Engelbart soon found himself marginalized and relegated to obscurity. Operational concerns at Tymshare overrode Engelbart's desire to do further research. Various executives, first at Tymshare and later at McDonnell Douglas, which acquired Tymshare in 1984, expressed interest in his ideas, but never committed the funds or the people to further develop them. His interest inside of McDonnell Douglas was focused on the enormous knowledge management and IT requirements involved in the life cycle of an aerospace program, which served to strengthen Engelbart's resolve to motivate the information technology arena toward global interoperability and an open hyperdocument system. Engelbart retired from McDonnell Douglas in 1986, determined to pursue his work free from commercial pressure.

== Books about ARC ==
The complex story of the rise and fall of ARC has been documented in a book by sociologist Thierry Bardini. From the perspective of the 1960s counter-culture revolution, John Markoff, in his book What the Dormouse Said, also follows Englebart's persistence in creating ARC as not only a collection of talented off-beat engineers working in direct contrast to the Stanford Artificial Intelligence Laboratory nearby, but also as a sociological experiment that constructed and tested methods for group creation and design.

ARC was also indirectly covered in many other books about Xerox PARC, since that is where many ARC employees later fled to (and brought some of Engelbart's ideas with them). Taylor had founded the Computer Systems Laboratory at PARC in 1970.
