= Management of hearing loss =

- Specialty: Audiology

Treatment depends on the specific cause if known as well as the extent, type, and configuration of the hearing loss. Most hearing loss results from age and noise, is progressive, and irreversible. There are currently no approved or recommended treatments to restore hearing; it is commonly managed through using hearing aids. A few specific types of hearing loss are amenable to surgical treatment. In other cases, treatment involves addressing underlying pathologies, but any hearing loss incurred may be permanent.

== Public health considerations ==
Management of hearing loss in older age especially is increasingly gaining specialized attention with "hearing health" becoming a recognized domain within overall health to support for healthy aging. A number of public health studies have shown the presence of a relationship between unaddressed hearing loss in older adults (i.e., not addressed with hearing aids or other strategies) and other conditions such as depression and declines in cognition and dementia. Many of these types of studies however only provide incomplete knowledge about these relationships with hearing loss. Such findings need to be interpreted cautiously as none are currently indicating that one condition causes the other.

The current evidence available can be more properly interpreted as providing scientific rationale for needing to support and conduct more and different types studies in order to accurately decipher whether other conditions like dementia are due to hearing loss. Managing hearing loss through a variety of strategies has been shown to provide substantial benefits for improving quality-of-life, communication, and psychosocial wellness, yet the majority of these studies do not reflect the shifting demographics found within the U.S. population. A systematic review of the literature found that race/ethnicity as well as sex were not well-represented nor at times tracked as participants in a large number of clinical trials.

== Hearing aids ==
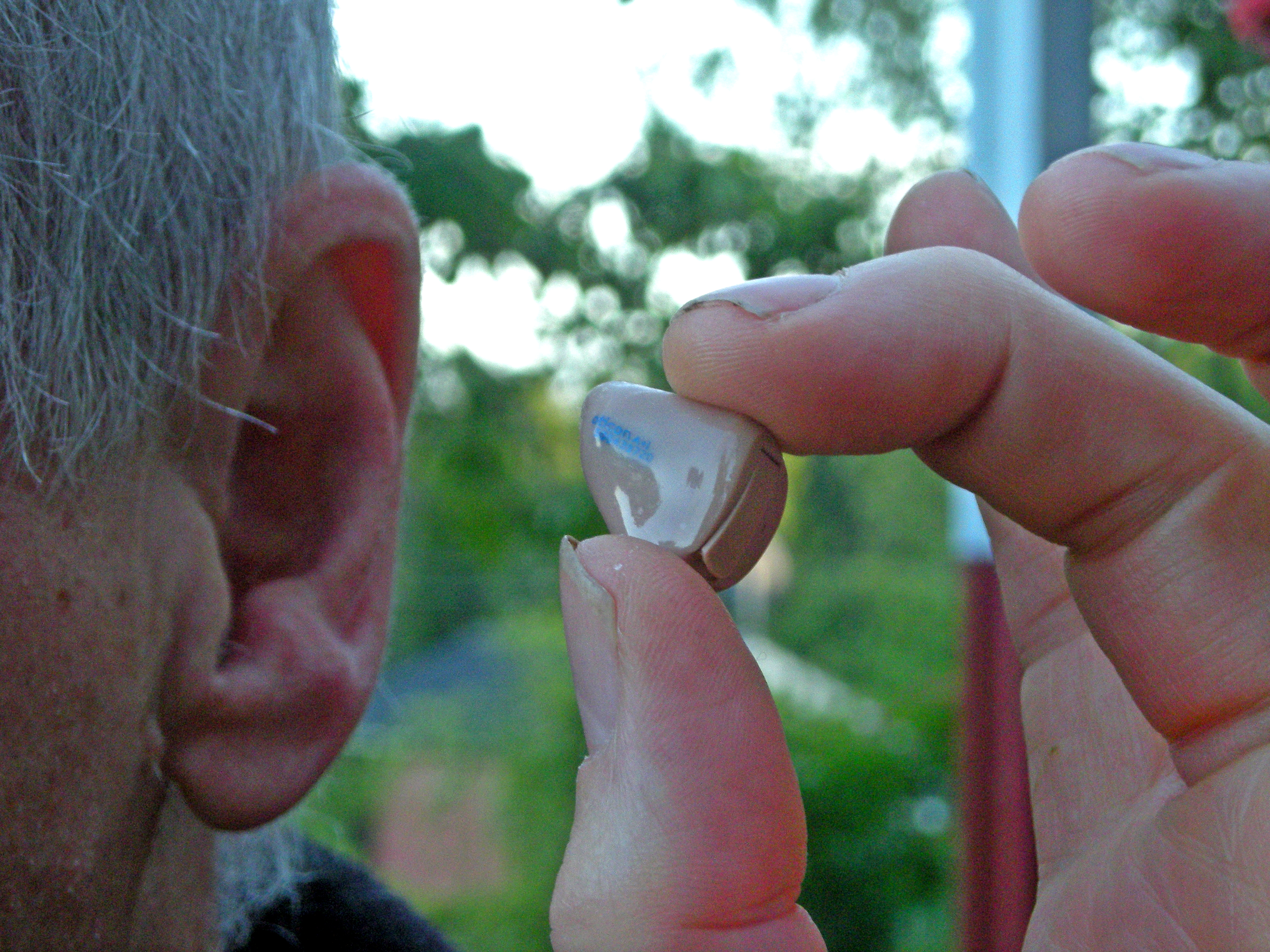
An in-the-canal hearing aid.

Hearing aids are devices that work by improving audibility of environmental sounds and speech comprehension for users with hearing loss. They amplify sound vibrations traveling through the air so that the user may follow voices and conversations around them better. Hearing aids have been shown to benefit adults with mild to moderate hearing loss in common everyday situations and may potentially contribute to some notable improvements in physical, social, emotional, and mental well-being. Despite these benefits, hearing aid use remains low among older adults in the United States with less than 20% of those with hearing loss reportedly using them in a nationally representative survey. Furthermore, up to 40% of adults who have hearing aids for hearing loss fail to use them, or do not use them to their full effect. A range of factors likely contribute to the low use of hearing aids such as, user dissatisfaction with the quality of device performance (e.g., increasing background noise instead of desirable sounds); issues with comfort, care, or maintenance of the device; aesthetic factors; issues with accessing necessary care; financial factors including challenges in affordability; and other prohibitive factors due to personal preferences.

There is little evidence that interventions to encourage the regular use of hearing aids, (e.g. improving the information given to people about how to use hearing aids), increase daily hours of hearing aid use, and there is currently no agreed set of outcome measures for measuring success for this type of intervention.

=== US Medicare coverage ===
Hearing aids are traditionally acquired through licensed hearing care professionals such as audiologists or hearing instrument specialists in a clinic- or storefront-based setting in the United States. Traditional Medicare policies do not cover the cost of professionally acquired hearing aids nor any rehabilitative services associated with it. The same policy also only provides coverage for hearing exams that are medically relevant, and otherwise do not cover the costs of an exam if one were for purposes of fitting a hearing aid. Some supplemental Medicare Advantage plans offer limited coverage, although a 2016 analysis of the Medicare Current Beneficiary Survey (MCBS) revealed that 75% of hearing-related services were still paid out-of-pocket.

=== Wireless hearing aids ===
A wireless device has two main components: a transmitter and a receiver. The transmitter broadcasts the captured sound, and the receiver detects the broadcast audio and enables the incoming audio stream to be connected to accommodations such as hearing aids or captioning systems.

Three types of wireless systems are commonly used: FM, audio induction loop, and InfraRed. Each system has advantages and benefits for particular uses. FM systems can be battery operated or plugged into an electrical outlet. FM system produce an analog audio signal, meaning they have extremely high fidelity. Many FM systems are very small in size, allowing them to be used in mobile situations. The audio induction loop permits the listener with hearing loss to be free of wearing a receiver provided that the listener has a hearing aid or cochlear implant processor with an accessory called a "telecoil". Listeners without a telecoil must carry a receiver with an earpiece. As with FM systems, the infrared (IR) system also requires a receiver to be worn or carried by the listener. An advantage of IR wireless systems is that people in adjoining rooms cannot listen in on conversations, making it useful for situations where privacy and confidentiality are required. Another way to achieve confidentiality is to use a hardwired amplifier, which contains or is connected to a microphone and transmits no signal beyond the earpiece plugged directly into it.

=== Over-the-counter hearing aids ===
Growing concerns surrounding the accessibility and affordability of hearing care, including hearing aids, in the United States contributed to the publication of an expert consensus report recommending the introduction of legislative actions. One legislative policy, the Over-the-Counter Hearing Aid Act of 2017 compelled the Food and Drug Administration (FDA) to create a new class of technologies that would facilitate the regulation of devices which members of the public may purchase over-the-counter. The legislation originally instituted a statutory deadline of three years (August 18, 2020) for the FDA to implement these new measures, but competing priorities due to the COVID-19 response reportedly delayed progress.

== Assistive devices ==
Many deaf and hard of hearing individuals use assistive devices in their daily lives:

- Individuals can communicate by telephone using telephone typewriters (TTY). Other common names are textphone, minicom and telecommunications device for the deaf (TDD). These devices look like typewriters or word processors and transmit typed text over regular telephone lines. This allows communication through visual messaging. TTYs can transmit messages to individuals who don't have TTY by using the National Relay service which is an operator that acts as a messenger to each caller. For mobile phones, software apps are available to provide TDD/textphone functionality on some carriers/models to provide 2-way communications.
- There are several new telecommunications relay service technologies including IP Relay and captioned telephone technologies. A deaf or hard of hearing person can communicate over the phone with a hearing person via a human translator. Phone captioning is a service in which a hearing person's speech is captioned by a third party, enabling a deaf or hard of hearing person to conduct a conversation with a hearing person over the phone. Wireless, Internet and mobile phone/SMS text messaging are beginning to take over the role of the TDD.
- Real-time text technologies, involving streaming text that is continuously transmitted as it is typed or otherwise composed. This allows conversational use of text.
- Instant messaging software.
- Videophones and similar video technologies can be used for distance communication using sign language. Video conferencing technologies permit signed conversations as well as permitting a sign language–English interpreter to voice and sign conversations between a deaf or hard of hearing person and that person's hearing party, negating the use of a TTY device or computer keyboard.
- Video relay service and video remote interpreting (VRI) services also use a third-party telecommunication service to allow a deaf or hard-of-hearing person to communicate quickly and conveniently with a hearing person, through a sign language interpreter.
- Hearing dogs are a specific type of assistance dog specifically selected and trained to assist the deaf and hard of hearing by alerting their handler to important sounds, such as doorbells, smoke alarms, ringing telephones, or alarm clocks.
- The advent of the Internet's World Wide Web and closed captioning has given the deaf and hard of hearing unprecedented access to information. Electronic mail and online chat have reduced the need for deaf and hard-of-hearing people to use a third-party Telecommunications Relay Service to communicate with the hearing and other deaf people.
- A person with hearing loss cannot always hear the phone or distinguish their own ringtone from another. A signaling transmitter can be attached to a phone that will cause a light or a vibration device to activate. Transmitters can also be used to activate visual cues to represent fire alarms.
- Individuals with hearing loss require phones with amplifiers that have a higher power of amplification when compared to a regular phone. The Hearing Aid Telephone Interconnect System is a hands free amplification system which allows people to amplify sound when using telephones, cell phones, computer and pay phones by way of the attachment of a portable unit.
- Computer-animated avatars, such as SiMAX, can be used to translate websites and other parts of daily life into sign language.

== Direct-to-consumer technologies ==
There is increasing evidence about the benefits that certain direct-to-consumer technologies, sometimes referred to as personal sound amplification products (PSAPs), provide as an alternative to conventional hearing aids acquired through licensed professionals. Options can range from smaller devices worn at the ear-level which look very similar to some types of hearing aids to larger "body-worn" types that are hand-held, which may be more appropriate for individuals with certain physical limitations.

=== Smartphone- and tablet-based technologies ===
The continuing innovation of consumer technologies introduces more accessibility options through applications and built-in operating system features that people with hearing loss may explore for supporting effective communication. For example, speech-to-text applications can be used to generate live captions to read should an individual be in a more challenging listening environment or situation. Some applications that provide additional amplification are also available that users may download.

== Communication strategies ==
Hearing care professionals also promote the use of certain communication strategies, which can be used in conjunction with technologies like hearing aids or without, for maintaining effective communication. Strategies broadly include two categories: Communication behaviors and environmental modification. Some examples of communication behaviors include:

- Ensuring attention
- Maintaining face-to-face conversations
- Speaking slow and low
- Not shouting
- Rephrasing vs. repeating

Along with environmental modifications like removing background noise and ensuring good lighting, applying communication strategies can help speakers and listeners enhance their conversations.

=== Face Masks ===
The increased use of face masks during the COVID-19 pandemic has also highlighted increased reports of the communication barriers they introduce. Face masks reduce the audibility of speech and eliminates many meaningful visual facial cues, making it more difficult for people with hearing loss to effectively communicate. In addition the a few of the behavioral strategies described above, the use of clear face masks are also promoted in addition.

== Surgery ==
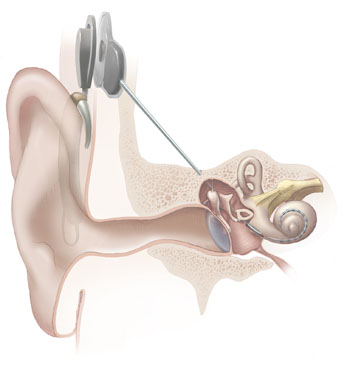
Illustration of a cochlear implant

There is no treatment, surgical or otherwise, for sensorineural hearing loss due to the most common causes (age, noise, and genetic defects). For a few specific conditions, surgical intervention can provide a remedy:

- surgical correction of superior canal dehiscence
- myringotomy, surgical insertion of drainage ventilation tubes in the tympanic membrane. Such placement is usually temporary until the underlying pathology (infection or other inflammation) can be resolved.
- radiotherapy or surgical excision of vestibular schwannoma or acoustic neuroma, though, in most cases, it is unlikely that hearing will be preserved
- Stapedectomy and stapedotomy for otosclerosis - replacement or reshaping of the stapes bone of the middle ear can restore hearing in cases of conductive hearing loss

Surgical and implantable hearing aids are an alternative to conventional external hearing aids. If the ear is dry and not infected, an air conduction aid could be tried; if the ear is draining, a direct bone conduction hearing aid is often the best solution. If the conductive part of the hearing loss is more than 30–35 dB, an air conduction device could have problems overcoming this gap. A bone-anchored hearing aid could, in this situation, be a good option. The active bone conduction hearing implant Bonebridge (a product of MED-EL corporation) is also an option. This implant is invisible under the intact skin and therefore minimises the risk of skin irritations.

Cochlear implants improve outcomes in people with hearing loss in either one or both ears. They work by artificial stimulation of the cochlear nerve by providing an electric impulse substitution for the firing of hair cells. They are expensive, and require programming along with extensive training for effectiveness.

Cochlear implants as well as bone conduction implants can help with single sided deafness. Middle ear implants or bone conduction implants can help with conductive hearing loss.

People with cochlear implants are at a higher risk for bacterial meningitis. Thus, meningitis vaccination is recommended. People who have hearing loss, especially those who develop a hearing problem in childhood or old age, may need support and technical adaptations as part of the rehabilitation process. Recent research shows variations in efficacy but some studies show that if implanted at a very young age, some profoundly impaired children can acquire effective hearing and speech, particularly if supported by appropriate rehabilitation.

== Education ==
For a classroom setting, children with hearing loss often benefit from direct instruction and communication as such as sign languages. Optimally children with hearing loss will be mainstreamed in a typical classroom and receive supportive services. One such is to sit as close to the teacher as possible improves the student's ability to hear the teacher's voice and to more easily read the teacher's lips. When lecturing, teachers can help the student by facing them and by limiting unnecessary noise in the classroom. In particular, the teacher can avoid talking when their back is turned to the classroom, such as while writing on a whiteboard. Instructing while using a sign language is often consider the best option for Deaf/Hard of Hearing students.

Some other approaches for classroom accommodations include pairing Deaf/Hard of Hearing students with hearing students. This allows the Deaf/Hard of Hearing student to ask the hearing student questions about concepts that they have not understood. The use of CART (Communication Access Real Time) systems, where an individual types a captioning of what the teacher is saying, is also beneficial. The student views this captioning on their computer. Automated captioning systems are also becoming a popular option. In an automated system, software, instead of a person, is used to generate the captioning. Unlike CART systems, automated systems generally do not require an Internet connection and thus they can be used anywhere and anytime. Another advantage of automated systems over CART is that they are much lower in cost. However, automated systems are generally designed to only transcribe what the teacher is saying and to not transcribe what other students say. An automated system works best for situations where just the teacher is speaking, whereas a CART system will be preferred for situations where there is a lot of classroom discussion.

For those students who are completely Deaf, one of the most common interventions is having the child communicate with a Teacher of Deaf and others through an interpreter using sign language.

=== Deaf school ===
Deaf school is where all Deaf/Hard of Hearing students enroll together, the usage of sign language at school is regularly. The Deaf schools refers to a school system established by government-sponsored to incorporate Deaf/Hard of Hearing students into the influence of their homes, families, traditions and cultures as such as signing community. Most Deaf schools have dormitory living equipped for students and provide academic, health and socialization program, some students choose to commute daily. Bilingual-bicultural education is one of many approaches used by institutional/residential schools, because many view residential life as the ideal opportunity for students who are Deaf to become familiar with the Deaf community and custom through Sign Language and literature. In Deaf schools, Deaf students would have more advantage in social experience than those who don't attend Deaf school, because of the same communication system that they get to use during social and class time. Some consider Deaf schools as 'Hogwarts', a fictional magical residential school from J.K. Rowling's Harry Potter series because of the parallel experiences in residential settings and cultures where Deaf students may learn about their heritage.

=== Mainstream ===
Mainstreamed school is integration where Deaf/Hard of Hearing and hearing students enroll together, some classes are inclusion. Some mainstream schools are public and private either. There are different three kind mainstreaming: Total mainstreaming, partial mainstreaming and team teaching. Total mainstream is the school where Deaf students would have all classes with hearing students, some might need special services as such as interpreters, notetakers or speech therapy. In partial mainstreaming, Deaf students would have some classes with hearing students and some in a resource program with a teacher of the Deaf. For team teaching, a teacher of the deaf and a general teacher would work together as co-teachers in a class of both hearing and Deaf students.

The Nunes & Pretzlik study (2001) argues that the integration of deaf students in mainstream schools actually promote gain in meaning and knowledge from experience and information with hearing peers. To counter another argument regards social consequences for those students who feel rejected or isolated in mainstream schools, which would lead to a lack of education. The study interviews Deaf and hearing peers and then compare the social adaptation in a mainstream school. The study finds that Deaf peers are more likely to be neglected and less likely to have a friend. Yet hearing peers who are friends of Deaf peers viewed their friendship as pro-social function compares with those hearing peers who have no Deaf friends. The study concludes that Deaf people are not rejected in the mainstream school, but feel isolated due to communication difficulties. Although, some hearing peers admittedly don't know how to solve communication difficulties, which lead hearing peers to prefer socializing with other hearing peers over Deaf peers. Nunes & Pretzlik (2001) believe that a mainstream school can have a dynamic role in encouraging hearing peers to learn how to overcome barriers and develop a more positive view toward Deaf peers.

=== Resource program ===
Resource program is similar to mainstreamed school, but a small group with an instructor in the classroom with additional supports. In a mainstream school, Deaf students have better perceptions of reading ability than those in the resource program due to the comparison and counterparts with hearing peers and those Deaf students in the resource program. On the other side, Deaf students who attend resource program actually receive better academic performances than those who attend mainstream and institutional, because of the additional support and quality time that they receive from an instructor. Resource program also allows students to choose preferred communication method as such as total communications in order to satisfy and exceed the maximum possibilities in attaining education thoroughly.

=== Post-secondary education ===
==== University ====
===== Gallaudet University =====
Gallaudet University is a federally chartered private university for the education of the Deaf and Hard of Hearing which is in Washington, D.C., Gallaudet University is known as 'Mecca' for Deaf students and educators, which is officially bilingual, with American Sign Language (ASL) and written English used for instruction and by the college community.

===== California State Northridge University =====
California State University at Northridge is a public state university and mainstream institution in the Northridge neighborhood of Los Angeles, California, contains a large number of Deaf and Hard of Hearing students majoring in Deaf studies and ASL/Deaf Theatre productions.

==== College ====
===== SouthWest Collegiate Institute for the Deaf =====
SouthWest Collegiate Institute for the Deaf is Howard College's fourth campus in Big Spring, Texas. It offer a wide range of courses in academic transfer, workforce education, risk management and workforce training instruction which is designed for self-contained instruction to meet the needs of Deaf and Hard of Hearing students.

==== Institute of Technology ====
===== National Technology Institute for the Deaf =====
National Technology Institute for the Deaf is the technological college for students who are Deaf and Hard of Hearing under Rochester Institute of Technology (RIT) in Rochester, New York, NTID provides academic programs, access, ASL in-class interpreters and support services.

== Views within Deaf community ==
There has been considerable controversy within the culturally deaf community over cochlear implants. For the most part, there is little objection to those who lost their hearing later in life, or culturally deaf adults choosing to be fitted with a cochlear implant.

Many in the deaf community strongly object to a deaf child being fitted with a cochlear implant (often on the advice of an audiologist); new parents may not have sufficient information on raising deaf children and placed in an oral-only program that emphasizes the ability to speak and listen over other forms of communication such as sign language or total communication. Many deaf people view cochlear implants and other hearing devices as confusing to one's identity. They feel a deaf person will never be a hearing person and therefore would be trying to fit into a way of living that is not their own. Other concerns include loss of Deaf culture and Deaf identity and the limitations of hearing restoration.

Jack R. Gannon, a professor at Gallaudet University, said this about Deaf culture: "Deaf culture is a set of learned behaviors and perceptions that shape the values and norms of deaf people based on their shared or common experiences." Some doctors believe that being deaf makes a person more social. Bill Vicars, from ASL University, shared his experiences as a deaf person, "[deaf people] tend to congregate around the kitchen table rather than the living room sofa... our good-byes take nearly forever, and our hellos often consist of serious hugs. When two of us meet for the first time we tend to exchange detailed biographies." Deaf culture is not about contemplating what deaf people cannot do and how to fix their problems, an approach known as the "pathological view of the deaf." Instead deaf people celebrate what they can do. There is a strong sense of unity between deaf people as they share their experiences of suffering through a similar struggle. This celebration creates a unity between even deaf strangers. Bill Vicars expresses the power of this bond when stating, "if given the chance to become hearing most [deaf people] would choose to remain deaf."

The United States-based National Association of the Deaf has a statement on its website regarding cochlear implants. The NAD asserts that the choice to implant is up to the individual (or the parents), yet strongly advocates a fully informed decision in all aspects of a cochlear implant. Much of the negative reaction to cochlear implants stems from the medical viewpoint that deafness is a condition that needs to be "cured," while the Deaf community instead regards deafness a defining cultural characteristic.

Many other assistive devices are more acceptable to the Deaf community, including but not limited to, hearing aids, closed captioning, email and the Internet, text telephones, and video relay services.
