= Organic minute =

An organic minute is defined as the natural state of which telecommunications relay calls are processed between caller and called parties through Communications Assistant (relay agent and video interpreter) that are in conversation mode; that is, no incentives to encourage unnecessary relay minutes.

Under the Americans with Disabilities Act of 1990, the U.S. Federal Communications Commission (FCC) compensates the use of Telecommunications Relay Service (TRS) for the deaf, hard of hearing (hoh) and speech-impaired for every minutes used. Interpretation of what defines organic minutes may vary among telecommunications relay service providers especially trying to benefit from ramping up unnecessary minutes for the sole purpose of making profit.

== History of 'inorganic' minutes ==
In 2009 Tom Chandler, chief of the FCC Disability Rights Office, expressed concerns about relay companies abusing their privileges to the TRS fund. He mentioned in his internal email distributions that the programs offered through the video relay service was a "classic fleecing of America." The government, he said, was reimbursing companies for it at "ridiculously high rates."

=== Venture capitalists ===
Video Relay Service companies, especially with venture capitalists behind the service, view this business opportunity as a quick way of making lucrative profits for their "good will". Companies are becoming creative with how to increase call minutes since every minute is compensated by the FCC.

=== Examples of inorganic calls ===
==== Tele-marketing ====
Relay companies would purposefully contract a telemarketing firm and create "job opportunities" for the deaf and hard of hearing by opening up positions. The deaf and hard of hearing staff under a telemarketing firm would call through the contracted relay provider thus generate minutes. In return, the telemarketing firm would appreciate a percentage of the profit from the TRS fund.

==== Conference calls ====
Another strategy by relay companies to create "job opportunities" would involve hiring anybody who knows sign language to engage in conference calls during the day on a daily basis. Whatever their job titles are, they are encouraged to call internally to a conference call bridge through their own Video Relay Service interpreter to communicate with each other.

==== Tele-seminars/Podcasts ====
Similar to the conference call strategy, the relay company would promote "educational seminars" for the deaf and hard of hearing over the phone via a conference call bridge. Each seminars usually last 60 minutes long. A large number of deaf and hard of hearing individuals are invited and they call the relay provider, who is promoting the tele-seminar.

The tele-seminars are provided at no cost to provide incentives for the deaf and hard of hearing to lure them into making an "educational" call. The minutes used through the tele-seminars are compensated along with lucrative profits.

==== Customer service/Survey group ====
Relay providers are not giving enough "job opportunities" for the deaf and hard of hearing in the Customer Service department. The reason is that the relay provider would prefer to place a hearing representative who will use the relay service to communicate to the deaf customers. This may be argued that it is in fact organic minutes; however, this is an example of "manufacturing minutes". The deaf and hard of hearing population would rather speak directly to another deaf and hard of hearing individual in their naive language.

== Original purpose of TRS ==
The original purpose of TRS is simply provide a two-way communication between deaf, hard of hearing, and speech-disabled individuals to leverage a functional equivalence experience. The service is not intended for any companies to make lucrative profits out of the TRS fund that are not true to the spirit of relay service.

According to the TRS Rules; § 64.601 Definitions and provisions of general applicability; Section (15), it is noted that "services that enable two-way communication between an individual who uses a text telephone or other nonvoice terminal device and an individual who does not use such a device, speech-to-speech services, video relay services and non-English relay services". The underlying concept of TRS is to provide a true telephone conversation between the caller and called parties (deaf/hoh/speech-disabled and hearing persons).
