= Telephone interpreting =

Service connecting human interpreters to users via telephone

Telephone interpreting connects human interpreters via telephone to individuals who wish to speak to each other but do not share a common language. The telephone interpreter converts the spoken language from one language to another, enabling listeners and speakers to understand each other. Interpretation over the telephone most often takes place in consecutive mode, which means that the interpreter waits until the speaker finishes an utterance before rendering the interpretation into the other language. As the use of the telephonic modality is increasing it is allowing users to access an interpreter immediately, regardless of time and location.

Telephone interpreting is one modality or delivery mechanism for providing interpreting services. Other forms of delivering interpreting services include in-person interpreting and video interpreting for the deaf and hard of hearing.

== Historical timeline ==
- 1950s: Telephone lines first proposed as a medium for the delivery of interpreting services.
- 1973: Australia introduces telephone interpretation as a fee-free service to respond to its growing immigrant communities.
- 1981: The first Over-the-Phone Interpretation (OPI) service is offered in the United States.
- 1981–1990: Telephone interpreting enters major U.S. industries including financial services, telecommunications, healthcare, and public safety.
- 1990s: The demand for telephone interpreting grows significantly; contributing factors include decreased prices in long-distance calls, toll-free number access, and immigration trends.
- 1995: Language Line in the UK was established by the social entrepreneur Michael Young, Baron Young of Darlington providing telephone interpreting in 140 languages It was sold to Language Line in Monterey, California in 2006.
- 1995: Language services company Kevmark, later known as CyraCom, patents a multiple-handset phone adapted for telephone interpreting.
- 1999: AT&T sells language services company Language Line Services.
- 2000s: Telephone interpretation becomes more sophisticated; quality of interpreting, faster connection speeds, and customer service become important to consumers.
- 2005: The U.S. telephone interpreting market is estimated at $200 million.
- 2013: Language Lines Services acquires Pacific Interpreters.
- 2016: France-based company Teleperformance announces plans to buy LanguageLine Solutions for $1.52 billion.

== Providers ==
There are many types of organizations that provide telephone interpreting services, including for-profit companies, governmental organizations, non-profit groups, and internal divisions within organizations. For example, the government of Australia operates a telephone interpreting service, as do the governments of South Africa and New Zealand.

=== United States ===
In the United States, telephone interpreting is widely used by its federal courts. Numerous commercial providers are also available and commonly used. Many of the commercial telephone interpreting providers connect users with interpreters for more than 150 languages. Some providers claim to have the ability to connect an interpreter at any time of day, within a matter of seconds. Some hospitals and health care systems also provide telephone interpreting services.

Major providers of telephone interpretation in the United States include Language Line Services, Lionbridge, CyraCom International, Pacific Interpreters. As of 2022 Transperfect is the largest grossing language service provider in the United States, followed by Language Line Services, and Lionbridge who holds the third spot. As the demand grows for language services so does the amount of language providers.

In 2013, Language Line Services acquired Pacific Interpreters.

=== United Kingdom ===
British social activist Michael Young noticed that language barriers were leading to substandard services for ethnic minorities at Royal London Hospital, so he obtained grant funding to provide free telephone interpreters starting in 1990. He branded this service the Language Line, and which went on to become the UK company Language Line Limited. The company grew significantly in its public sector client base, from Police on the Isle of Dogs (his second client) across clients in most sectors.

In 2006, the US corporate Language Line Inc. acquired Language Line Ltd. However, during 2006, the Department for Work and Pensions created the "Pan Government Framework for Telephone Interpreting" (contract reference CAG/912/0181). This was the first national contract encompassing the UK public sector telephone interpreting provision, and it was awarded to UK competitor thebigword. Driven by the contract win, thebigword developed the UK's first proprietary telephone interpreting platform in 2007 under the stewardship of Simon Moxon and Jonathan Potter.

At that time, the US market was roughly 8-years more advanced: telephone interpreting was more broadly accepted as a substitute service for many face-to-face interpreted situations, viewed much more as a commodity, and where technological innovation was driving supplier dominance. The UK's approach to delivery was very much shaped by this, with one key difference: in the US 80% of non-English demand was Spanish, whereas UK demand was driven by a more diverse dispersion of Eastern European migratory languages.

By 2008 the value of this Pan Government contract had exceeded £12m, however when considering extraneous areas of public, private and third-sector spend at this time, the UK telephone interpreting whole-market value is estimated at £20m. This is the first known UK telephone interpreting market valuation. Since that period, public sector contracting has dominated the landscape. Unlike the de facto demand of Spanish in the US the rapid Telephone interpretation growth in the UK was driven by the Disability Discrimination Act (replaced by the Equality Act), and the migratory influences of Europe. This is why market growth in the private sector is much smaller in the UK.

There is now a prevalence of companies that offer this service, many on a global basis which is a natural benefit of "virtualising" interpretation. Similarly to translation, the diversity of organisations cover generic interpretation, as well as domain-specific services such as legal, medical, pharmaceutical and other technical. The UK and US markets are also very heavily influenced by the fact they are largely delivered by a freelance supply chain.

== Equipment ==
Users typically access telephone interpreting services with a telephone or computer with VoIP. However, if the two parties wishing to communicate are in the same location, using a dual handset phone, a phone with two receivers, can relieve the two parties from passing a phone back and forth. Speakerphones are also sometimes used, but these can create challenges both in terms of confidentiality, and for the interpreter, especially due to background noise, which can hinder the interpreter's ability to hear.

Where one party is deaf, hard-of-hearing or speech-impaired, communication via an off-site sign language interpreter can be performed using a video link using the necessary video telecommunication equipment.

== Access ==
The provisioning of telephone interpreting generally fits into two main categories:

- Automated: an Interactive Voice Response (IVR) application is employed to convert spoken or keyed Dual Tone Multi Frequency (DTMF) data into a request for connecting to an interpreter in a specific language (identified by unique language-codes).
- Operator-led: utilise customer-care staff to answer the call, gather the required information from the caller, and facilitate the connection to the interpreter. A service of this nature can be preferred by organisations such as emergency services, where the client's knowledge of language codes is absent.

Additionally, some of the companies that have the required capability will offer a hybrid of the two principles, where for example a customer can:

- Call in to the service
- Input their "account code" into a single-layer Interactive Voice Response (IVR) using the phone keypad
- Be connected to a call-centre agent who will already know who the caller is, and will facilitate other data capture relevant to the call (including the required language)

== Uses ==
Telephone interpreting is widely used in a number of settings, including health care, government, hospitals, financial, emergency telephone call centres (e.g. '9-1-1' or '1-1-2'), and others. Telephone interpreting is especially helpful for settings in which the two parties would communicate via telephone anyway, such as interactions between call centers and consumers, calls between members of the public and emergency telephone call centres, etc. Telephone interpreting can be used to take applications over the phone and help individuals with account issues.

Telephone interpretation via Video Remote Interpreting (VRI) or a Video Relay Service (VRS) are also useful where one of the parties is deaf, hard-of-hearing or speech-impaired. In such cases the interpretation flow is normally within the same principal language, such as French Sign Language (FSL) to spoken French, Spanish Sign Language (SSL) to spoken Spanish, British Sign Language (BSL) to spoken English, and American Sign Language (ASL) also to spoken English (since BSL and ASL are completely distinct), etc. Multilingual sign language interpreters, who can also translate as well across principal languages (such as to and from SSL, to and from spoken English), are also available, albeit less frequently. Such activities involve considerable effort on the part of the translator, since sign languages are distinct natural languages with their own construction and syntax, which are different from the aural version of the same principal language.

== Market ==
In 2007, the global telephone interpreting market was claimed to be worth $700 million, with an estimated $500 million generated in the United States. Industry analyst firm Common Sense Advisory estimates that in 2012, the market will be worth $1.2 billion, an increase of 70% from 2007. The market for telephone interpreting is global in scope and includes companies from the United States, the Netherlands, Sweden, France, the United Kingdom, Canada, India, China, Norway, Spain, and Hong Kong.

However, market-size estimates have historically been fundamentally flawed for two principal reasons. Reports and sources such as all of those referenced above rely almost entirely on self-reporting by the service providers in the industry, with no substantive way of corroborating or validating. Secondly and most importantly, because of the nature of telephone interpreting as an on-demand commoditised service, this industry segment is notoriously incestuous. The prevalence of subcontracting has created a complex and volatile web of cross-dependencies, with some end-customer calls traversing a chain of organisations each subcontracting to the next. This concatenation means that the volumes of business declared in market-wide surveys incorporates a significant amount of double, triple and even quadruple counting.

== See also ==
- Language interpretation
- Video Relay Service: for use where a deaf/hard-of-hearing/speech-impaired person is not located at the same place as the hearing person. The sign language interpreter is additionally situated in a third location, typically a video-enabled relay call centre.
- Video Remote Interpreting: for use where a deaf/hard-of-hearing/speech-impaired person and the hearing person are located at the same place, such as a hospital, with the sign language interpreter located off-site.
