= Weitbrecht =

Weitbrecht is a surname. Notable people with the surname include:

- H. U. Weitbrecht (1851–1937), British Anglican missionary
- Josias Weitbrecht (1702–1747), German professor of medicine and anatomy
- Robert Weitbrecht (1920–1983), American engineer

== See also ==
- Weinbrecht, surname
- Weitbrecht Communications
