= Communication Service for the Deaf =

Communication Service for the Deaf (CSD) is a global social impact organization founded in 1975 by Benjamin Soukup and based in Texas. CSD provides technologies, resources, and services that benefit the deaf and hard-of-hearing community.

CSD is made up of several divisions that are each focused on meeting different needs within the deaf community. These include interpreting and customer service platforms, job training, educational resources, engineering insights and services, advocacy, and business development support.

== Mission ==
CSD is a deaf-led social impact organization with the mission of identifying and cultivating opportunities for deaf people to achieve success through multiple approaches: service delivery, communication solutions, innovation engineering, impact investing, and community building.

== History ==
- 1975: CSD was founded when it began providing sign language interpreting services in Sioux Falls, South Dakota.
- 1981: CSD began providing a 24-hour Telecommunications Relay Service (TRS) in Sioux Falls, South Dakota.
- 1982: Established a community education program focused on independent living, employment services, and drug/alcohol education and advocacy.
- 1986: Established a job training program.
- 1992: CSD partners with Sprint to expand Telecommunications Relay Services.
- 1999: CSD Initiates Video Relay Service (VRS) and Video Remote Interpreting (VRI) Trials in South Dakota.
- 2000: Supported the establishment of a domestic violence program in Minnesota.
- 2004: CSD partners with America Online (AOL) to provide deaf-friendly customer support to AOL members.
- 2009: FCC grants CSD $1.1 million to implement an awareness campaign about the transition to digital television (DTV).
- 2010: US Dept. Of Commerce – National Telecommunication and Information Administration grants CSD a $14.9 million contract for nationwide broadband and equipment deployment.
- 2011: CSD launches nationwide TRS, CapTel, VRS, VRI and equipment distribution services in New Zealand.
- 2017: CSD launches the CSD Social Venture Fund to cultivate deaf-owned enterprises.
