= Video relay interpreting =

Video relay interpreting may refer to:

- Video remote interpreting, where two parties at the same physical location call a remote interpreter
- Video relay service, where the two parties and the interpreter are at three separate physical locations
