= Norwood Systems =

Australian telecommunications company

- Company type: Public Ltd (ASX: NOR)
- Industry: Telecommunications
- Founded: 2015 in Australia
- Headquarters: Perth, Australia
- Key people: Paul Ostergaard, CEO & Founder
- Products: World Message; World Phone; World Secure; World Voicemail; World Wi-Fi
- Website: norwoodsystems.com

Norwood Systems is an Australian telecommunications software company headquartered in Perth, Western Australia. It provides cognitive, voice, messaging and data services for carriers, consumers and enterprises globally.

The company was founded by former 3Com Corporation executive Paul Ostergaard, in May 2015. It is listed on the Australian Securities Exchange.

== Services ==
Norwood Systems offers several technologies, including a new Cognitive Platform, communication applications, World Voicemail, World Phone, World Message, SecondLine and data services, World Secure and World Wi-Fi.

The company generates revenue through its telecommunication and enterprise customers, and consumer application subscribers.

=== Cognitive Platform ===
Norwood's Cognitive Voice Services Platform uses AI and Natural Language Understanding (NLU) to offer digital cognitive services. The platform launched in 2022 under the Aïda brand name, available as a white-label offering to telecommunication providers. Aïda acts as a personalised virtual assistant that screens for spam, take messages and route calls.

=== World Voicemail ===
World Voicemail is a visual voicemail application available on iOS and Android. The service enables its users to listen to and read transcriptions of their voicemails.

The World Voicemail platform is also a white-labelled service to telecommunication providers worldwide.

=== World Phone ===
World Phone is a VOIP-based communication application available on iOS and Android. Users of the application can purchase World Credit through the app to make international and domestic calls.

The service lets users lease virtual phone numbers from several countries for inbound and outbound calls.

=== World Message ===
World Message is an instant messaging and SMS communications application available on iOS and Android. Like World Phone, users can lease virtual international phone numbers for inbound and outbound text messages.

=== SecondLine ===
SecondLine is a joint offering of the company's World Phone and World Message applications. When used together with a virtual phone number capable of both Voice and Messaging, the user effectively holds a fully functional secondary phone number on their device.

The SecondLine service is available to enterprise and government customers as a SaaS solution that can be managed and configured through a cloud-based web portal.

=== World Secure ===
World Secure is an on-demand and dynamic VPN application available on iOS and Android. The app allows its users to connect to the internet through a VPN. World Secure's key feature is its ability to automatically switch to its VPN when connected to an insecure Wi-Fi access point like a public hotspot.

=== World Wi-Fi ===
World Wi-Fi is a Wi-Fi finder application available on iOS and Android. Users can use a map or augmented reality (AR) to precisely find and connect to public Wi-Fi access points worldwide.
