= Transcription (service) =

Business service that converts speech into a written or electronic text document

A transcription service is a business service that converts speech (either live or recorded) into a written or electronic text document. Transcription services are often provided for business, academic, legal, or medical purposes. The most common type of transcription is from a spoken-language source into text. Common examples are the proceedings of a court hearing such as a criminal trial (by a court reporter) or a physician's recorded voice notes (medical transcription).

Some transcription businesses can send staff to events, speeches, or seminars, who then convert the spoken content into text. Some companies also accept recorded speech, either on cassette, CD, VHS, or as sound files. For a transcription service, various individuals and organizations have different rates and methods of pricing. Transcription companies primarily serve private law firms, local, state, and federal government agencies and courts, trade associations, meeting planners, and nonprofits.

== History ==
Before 1970, transcription was a difficult job, as secretaries had to write down the speech as they heard it using advanced skills, like shorthand. They also had to be at the location where the service was required. But with the introduction of tape cassettes and portable recorders in the late 1970s, the work became much easier and new possibilities emerged. Transcribers were able to conduct remote work for many different businesses at their own convenience, provided they met the deadlines required by their clients.

Modern technology like speech recognition has made transcription much easier. An MP3-based Dictaphone, for example, can be used to record the sound. Recordings for transcription can be in different media file types. The recording can then be opened in a PC, uploaded to a cloud storage, or emailed within minutes to someone who could be anywhere in the world. Recordings can be transcribed manually or automatically. The transcriptionist can replay the audio several times in a transcription editor and type what he or she hears to manually transcribe files, or with speech recognition technology convert audio files to the text. The manual transcription can be accelerated using different transcription hot keys. The sound can also be filtered, equalized or have the tempo adjusted when the clarity is poor. The completed document can then be emailed back and printed out or incorporated into other documents – all within just a few hours of the original recording being made.

The industry standard for transcribing an audio file takes one hour for every 15 minutes of audio. For live usage, real-time text transcription services are available for captioning purposes, including Remote CART, Captioned Telephone, and live closed captioning for live broadcasts. Live transcripts are less accurate than offline transcripts, as there is no time for corrections and refinements. However, in a multistage subtitling process with a broadcast delay and access to a live audio feed it is possible to have several correction stages and for the text to be displayed at the same time as the "live" transmission.

== Interviews ==
Interview transcription is a word-to-word written documentation of a taped or live interview. All types of interviews pertaining to legal cases, businesses, research, celebrity interviews and many more can be transcribed. A written transcript is also important to identify key topics discussed in an interview. People with hearing imparity or deafness can also have access to the interview proceedings with accurately prepared interview transcripts.

Most transcripts are written in a non-verbatim form, including the words that were said as part of the dialogue. Verbatim transcription is the most accurate form of transcription, which includes the dialogue along with stutters, false starts, and sounds.

== Legal ==
Legal transcription is creating a text document by typing the words heard in audiovisual or audio recordings of legal proceedings. The transcripts are significantly easier to read and navigate. In a live setting, court reporters perform this function.

Legal transcription is different from general or medical transcription in that it requires a specialized understanding of legal terminology and procedures. In some cases, legal transcriptionists may need to be certified or trained to work in this field.

== Medical ==
By the early 1900s, the main responsibility of a doctor lay in treating the patient and other responsibilities such as creating a patient's medical record, keeping the files up to date and any other related paperwork eventually fell into the hands of hired medical stenographers. With the invention of typewriters, maintaining records became easier and with the invention of cassette players, it made way for the development of transcription machines. The initial versions available for purchase, offered the ability to record speech on cassette tapes. In fact, they were very popular for a long time although they did not offer much voice clarity at all. As soon as the usage of computers picked up in organizations and in other sectors, cassette tapes were replaced with better storage devices such as floppy discs and CDs. Today, the availability of highly sophisticated recording equipment ensures that multiple high clarity files can be created, stored, and sent for medical transcription purposes.

Medical transcription presents other challenges as a service to the transcriber. For example, working knowledge of medical terminology like ICD codes and an understanding of the rules and regulations regarding HIPAA compliance may be necessary to complete a medical transcription service.

== Security ==
Companies follow the various laws and industry best practices, especially when serving law firms, government agencies or courts. Medical transcription specifically is governed by HIPAA, which elaborates data security practices and compliance measures.

Transcription security includes maintaining the confidentiality of the data through information security practices including limiting access with passwords and ensuring a secure environment for data and appropriate methods of disposal of all materials and deletion of files. Personnel may be required to sign non-disclosure agreements on a regular basis.
