= James Masters =

James Masters may refer to:

- James Masters (Gaelic footballer) (born 1982), Irish footballer for the Nemo Rangers
- Judy Masters (James William Masters, 1892–1955), Australian footballer
- James M. Masters Sr. (1911–1988), United States Marine Corps general

== See also ==
- James Marsters (born 1962), American actor and musician
- James C. Marsters (1924–2009), inventor
