= Weinbrecht =

Weinbrecht is a surname. Notable people with the surname include:

- Donna Weinbrecht (born 1965), American freestyle skier
- Harold Weinbrecht (born 1956), American politician

== See also ==
- Weitbrecht, surname
