= Telecommunications device for the deaf =

Electronic text communication device

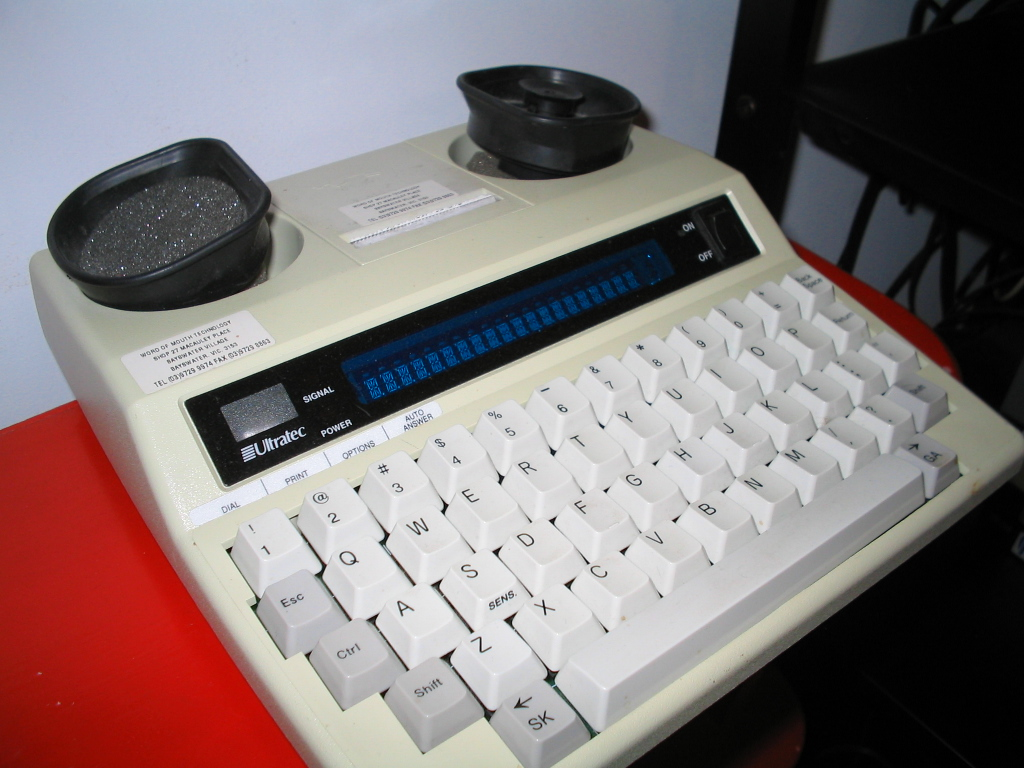
Miniprint 425 TDD. The acoustic coupler on the top is for use with telephone handsets. The printer records the conversation. The specific GA and SK keys allow for speedier use of common abbreviations.

A telecommunications device for the deaf (TDD) is a teleprinter, an electronic device for text communication over a telephone line, that is designed for use by Deaf people or persons with hearing or speech difficulties. Other names for the device include teletypewriter (TTY), textphone (common in Europe), and minicom (United Kingdom).

The typical TDD is a device about the size of a typewriter or laptop computer with a QWERTY keyboard and small screen that uses an LED, LCD, or VFD screen to display typed text electronically. In addition, TDDs commonly have a small spool of paper on which text is also printed – old versions of the device had only a printer and no screen. The text is transmitted live, via a telephone line, to a compatible device, i.e. one that uses a similar communication protocol.

Special telephone services have been developed to carry the TDD functionality even further. In certain countries, there are systems in place so that a deaf person can communicate with a hearing person on an ordinary voice phone using a human relay operator. There are also "carry-over" services, enabling people who can hear but cannot speak ("hearing carry-over", a.k.a. "HCO"), or people who cannot hear but are able to speak ("voice carry-over", a.k.a. "VCO") to use the telephone.

The term TDD is sometimes discouraged because people who are d/Deaf are increasingly using mainstream devices and technologies to carry out most of their communication. The devices described here were developed for use on the partially-analog Public Switched Telephone Network (PSTN). They do not work well on the new internet protocol (IP) networks. Thus as society increasingly moves toward IP based telecommunication, the telecommunication devices used by people who are deaf will not be TDDs. In the US and Canada, the devices are referred to as TTYs.

Teletype Corporation, of Skokie, Illinois, made page printers for text, notably for news wire services and telegrams, but these used standards different from those for deaf communication, and although in quite widespread use, were technically incompatible. Furthermore, these were sometimes referred to by the "TTY" initialism, short for "Teletype". When computers had keyboard input mechanisms and page printer output, before CRT terminals came into use, Teletypes were the most widely used devices. They were called "console typewriters". (Telex used similar equipment, but was a separate international communication network.)

== History ==
=== APCOM acoustic coupler or MODEM device ===
The TDD concept was developed by James C. Marsters (1924–2009), a dentist and private airplane pilot who became deaf as an infant because of scarlet fever, and Robert Weitbrecht, a deaf physicist. In 1964, Marsters, Weitbrecht and Andrew Saks, an electrical engineer and grandson of the founder of the Saks Fifth Avenue department store chain, founded APCOM (Applied Communications Corp.), located in the San Francisco Bay area, to develop the acoustic coupler, or modem; their first product was named the PhoneType. APCOM collected old teleprinter machines (TTYs) from the Department of Defense and junkyards. Acoustic couplers were cabled to TTYs enabling the AT&T standard Model 500 telephone to couple, or fit, into the rubber cups on the coupler, thus allowing the device to transmit and receive a unique sequence of tones generated by the different corresponding TTY keys. The entire configuration of teleprinter machine, acoustic coupler, and telephone set became known as the TTY. Weitbrecht invented the acoustic coupler modem in 1964. The actual mechanism for TTY communications was accomplished electro-mechanically through frequency-shift keying (FSK) allowing only half-duplex communication, where only one person at a time can transmit.

=== Paul Taylor TTY device ===
During the late 1960s, Paul Taylor combined Western Union Teletype machines with modems to create teletypewriters, known as TTYs. He distributed these early, non-portable devices to the homes of many in the deaf community in St. Louis, Missouri. He worked with others to establish a local telephone wake-up service. In the early 1970s, these small successes in St. Louis evolved into the nation's first local telephone relay system for the deaf.

=== Micon Industries MCM device ===
In 1973, the Manual Communications Module (MCM), which was the world's first electronic portable TTY allowing two-way telecommunications, premiered at the California Association of the Deaf convention in Sacramento, California. The battery-powered MCM was invented and designed by a deaf news anchor and interpreter, Kit Patrick Corson, in conjunction with Michael Cannon and physicist Art Ogawa. It was manufactured by Michael Cannon's company, Micon Industries, and initially marketed by Kit Corson's company, Silent Communications. In order to be compatible with the existing TTY network, the MCM was designed around the five-bit Baudot code established by the older TTY machines instead of the ASCII code used by computers. The MCM was an instant success with the deaf community despite the drawback of a $599 cost. Within six months there were more MCMs in use by the deaf and hard of hearing than TTY machines. After a year Micon took over the marketing of the MCM and subsequently concluded a deal with Pacific Bell (who coined the term "TDD") to purchase MCMs and rent them to deaf telephone subscribers for $30 per month.

After Micon formed an alliance with APCOM, Michael Cannon (Micon), Paul Conover (Micon), and Andrea Saks (APCOM) successfully petitioned the California Public Utilities Commission (CPUC), resulting in a tariff that paid for TTY devices to be distributed free of cost to deaf persons. Micon produced over 1,000 MCMs per month, resulting in approximately 50,000 MCMs being disseminated into the deaf community.

Before he left Micon in 1980, Michael Cannon developed several computer compatible variations of the MCM and a portable, battery operated printing TTY, but they were never as popular as the original MCM. Newer model TTYs could communicate with selectable codes that allow communications at a higher bit rate on those models similarly equipped. However, the lack of true computer interface functionality spelled the demise of the original TTY and its clones. During the mid-1970s, other so-called portable telephone devices were being cloned by other companies, and this was the time period when the term "TDD" began being used largely by those outside the deaf community.

=== Text messaging and the Def-Tone System (DTS) ===
This relay system became known commonly as the Def-Tone System (DTS) because the tones representing letters of the alphabet were eventually carried in tones outside the range of human hearing. Today, this is commonly called multi-tap because you press a number 1, 2 or 3 times to get a corresponding letter. In 1994 Joseph Alan Poirier, a college student-worker, recommended using the system to send texts to forklifts to improve delivery of parts to the assembly line at GM Powertrain in Toledo, Ohio, and sending a text to pagers. He recommended taking pagers to alphanumeric displays incorporating the same system in discussions with the pager supplier for Outback Steakhouse and having relays put in the forklifts to ping alert messages to the pagers used in that system. He called it text messaging, coining the phrase. It is theorized that when Toyota forklift was allegedly hired by GM for this work, one of the subcontractors, Kyocera, utilized the work for the Toyota forklift company to create text messaging for cell phones.

=== Marsters Award ===
In 2009, AT&T received the James C. Marsters Promotion Award from TDI (formerly Telecommunications for the Deaf, Inc.) for its efforts to increase accessibility to communication for people with disabilities. The award holds some irony; it was AT&T that, in the 1960s, resisted efforts to implement TTY technology, claiming it would damage its communication equipment. In 1968, the Federal Communications Commission struck down AT&T's policy and forced it to offer TTY access to its network.

== Protocols ==
There are many different standards for TDDs and textphones.

=== Original 5-bit Baudot code ===
The original standard used by TTYs is a variant of the Baudot code. The maximum speed of this protocol is 10 characters per second. This is a half-duplex protocol, which means that only one person at a time may transmit characters. If both try to transmit at the same time, the characters will be garbled on the other end.

This protocol is commonly used in the United States.

TTY 5-bit character set
Code			Character	
Decimal	Hex	Binary	Letters (LTRS)	Figures (FIGS)
0	00	00000	(backspace)	
1	01	00001	E	3
2	02	00010	(linefeed)	
3	03	00011	A	-
4	04	00100	(space)	
5	05	00101	S	-
6	06	00110	I	8
7	07	00111	U	7
8	08	01000	(carriage return)	
9	09	01001	D	$
10	0A	01010	R	4
11	0B	01011	J	'
12	0C	01100	N	,
13	0D	01101	F	!
14	0E	01110	C	:
15	0F	01111	K	(
16	10	10000	T	5
17	11	10001	Z	"
18	12	10010	L	)
19	13	10011	W	2
20	14	10100	H	=
21	15	10101	Y	6
22	16	10110	P	0
23	17	10111	Q	1
24	18	11000	O	9
25	19	11001	B	?
26	1A	11010	G	+
27	1B	11011	(FIGS shift)	
28	1C	11100	M	.
29	1D	11101	X	/
30	1E	11110	V	;
31	1F	11111	(LTRS shift)	

This is a variant of the Baudot code, implemented as 5-bits per character transmitted asynchronously using frequency-shift key-modulation at either 45.5 or 50 baud, 1 start bit, 5 data bits, and 1.5 stop bits. Details of the protocol implementation are available in TIA-825-A and also in T-REC V.18 Annex A "5-bit operational mode".

=== Turbo Code ===
The UltraTec company implements another protocol known as Enhanced TTY, which it calls "Turbo Code", in its products. Turbo Code has some advantages over Baudot protocols, such as a higher data rate, full ASCII compliance, and full-duplex capability. However, Turbo Code is proprietary, and UltraTec gives its specifications only to parties who are willing to license it, although some information concerning it is disclosed in US patent 5,432,837.

=== Other legacy protocols ===
Other protocols used for text telephony are European Deaf Telephone (EDT) and dual-tone multi-frequency signaling (DTMF).

The ITU-T V-series recommendations include the following early modem standards approved by the ITU in 1988:

- ITU-T V.21 specifies 300 bits per second duplex mode.
- ITU-T V.23 specifies audio frequency-shift keying modulation to encode and transfer data at 600/1200 bits per second.

=== V.18 ===
In 1994, the ITU approved the V.18 standard, which comprises two major parts, a dual standard. It is both an umbrella protocol that allows recognition and interoperability of some of the most commonly used textphone protocols, as well as offering a native V.18 mode, which is an ASCII full- or half-duplex modulation method.

Computers can, with appropriate software and modem, emulate a V.18 TTY. Some voice modems, coupled with appropriate software, can now be converted to TTY modems by using a software-based decoder for TTY tones. Same can be done with such software using a computer's sound card, when coupled to the telephone line.

In the UK, a virtual V.18 network, called TextDirect, exists as part of the Public Switched Telephone Network (PSTN), thereby offering interoperability between textphones using different protocols. The platform also offers additional functionality like call progress and status information in text and automatic invocation of a relay service for speech-to-text calls.

=== Cell phones ===
Many digital cell phones are compatible with TTY devices.

Many people want to replace TTY with real-time text over IP (RTT), which can be used on a digital cell phone or tablet without a separate TTY device.

=== New technologies ===
As TDDs are increasingly considered legacy devices, with the emergence of modern technologies such as email, texting and instant messaging, text from TDD are increasingly being sent over Text over IP gateways, or other real-time text protocols. However, these newer methods require IP connections and will not work with regular analog phone lines, unless a data connection is used (i.e. dial-up Internet, or the modem method of multiplexing text and voice that is done on a Captioned Telephone hardware handset). Because some people have no access to any kind of data connection, and it is not even available in some parts within many countries, TTYs are still the only method for analog landline text phone calls, although TTYs include any device with a suitable modem and software.

== Other devices for the deaf or hard of hearing ==
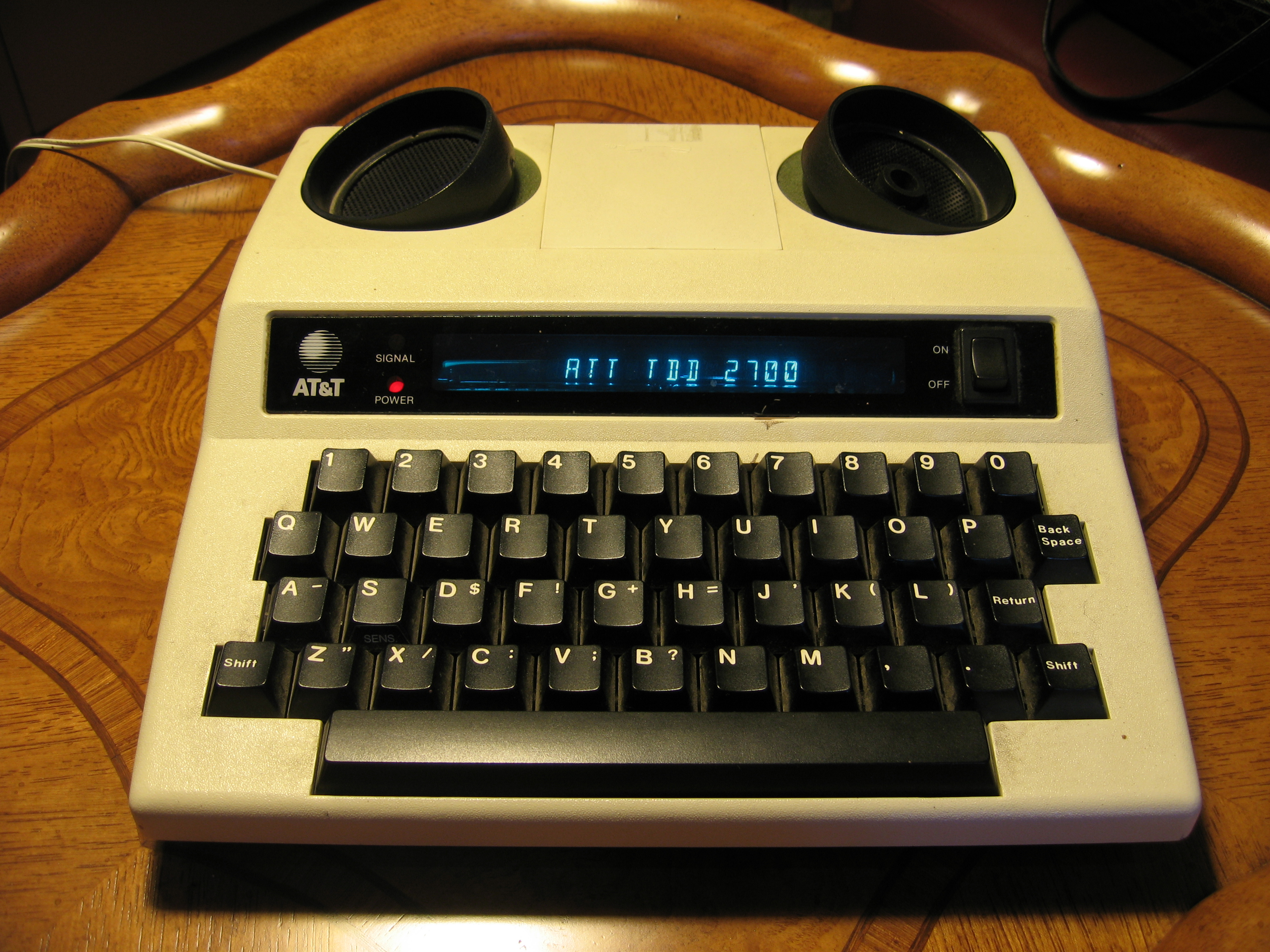
AT&T TDD 2700

In addition to TDD, there are a number of pieces of equipment that can be coupled to telephones to improve their utility. For those with hearing difficulties the telephone ring and conversation sound level can be amplified or pitch adjusted; ambient noise can also be filtered. The amplifier can be a simple addition or through an inductive coupler to interact with suitable hearing aids. The ring can also be supplemented with extension bells or a visual call indicator.

== Etiquette ==
There are some etiquette rules that users of TTYs must be aware of. Because of the inability to detect when a person has finished speaking—and the fact that two people typing will scramble the text on both ends—the term "Go Ahead" (GA) is used to denote the end of a turn, and an indication for the other person to begin typing.

Commonly used abbreviations
Initialism	
BRB	Be Right Back
CA	Communications assistant (another term for an RO/relay operator)
CU	See You (be seeing you)
GA	Go Ahead
SK	Stop Keying (not an imperative to the other person but rather a description of what the keyer is doing: preventing the subsequent dead air from confusing the recipient by letting the recipient know not to expect any more messages, but also letting the recipient know that the keyer remains "listening" for any "goodbye"-type message)
SKSK	Now hanging up (used in reply to SK as confirmation that the replying keyer has nothing left to say and that both ends of the conversation [and, therefore, the conversation as a whole] are terminated)
GA OR SK, SKGA, BiBi	Goodbye
Q, QQ, QM	Question Mark (?)
PLS	Please
RO	Relay Operator (another term for a CA/Communications assistant)
OIC	Oh, I See
OPR	Operator
NBR	Number
TMW	Tomorrow
THX	Thanks
WRU	Who are You? (or Where are You?)
XXXX	Xs are often used to indicate a typing error instead of backspacing

=== Sample conversation ===
Caller A: HELLO JOHN, WHAT TIME WILL YOU BE COMING AROUND TODAY Q GA
Caller B: HI FRED, I WILL BE AROUND NOON GA
Caller A: OK, NO PROBLEM, DON'T FORGET TO BRING THE BOOKS AND THE WORK SO FAR GA
Caller B: WILL DO SK
Caller A: BYE BYE SKSK

SK is used to allow the users to say their farewells, while SKSK indicates an immediate call hang-up.

=== Sample conversation 2 ===
Caller A HI, THIS IS JOHN, CAN I ASK WHO IS CALLING? GA
Caller B HI JOHN, ITS ME FRED, I AM WONDERING WHERE YOU ARE, ITS GETTING LATE TO GO OUT TO THE PUB GA
Caller A HI FRED, SORRY I DONT THINK I CAN GO GA
Caller B WHY CANT YOU GO? GA
Caller A MY WIFE IS NOT FEELING WELL AND I HAVE NO BABYSITTER FOR MY KIDS! GA
Caller B AWWWW DARN. I WANTED YOU THERE. OH WELL WHAT CAN YOU DO ? GA
Caller A I KNOW.. I GOTTA GO. THE KIDS NEED ME. SEE YOU AROUND! BYE FOR NOW SK
Caller B OK NO WORRIES SEE YOU SOON! BYE BYE SK GA
Caller A SKSK (THE PARTY HAS HUNG UP)

=== Sample text relay call ===
Caller A TXD DIALING.. TXD RING... TXD OPERATOR CONNECTED.. EXPLAINING TEXT RELAY SERVICE. PLEASE WAIT.... HI THIS IS JOHN GA
Caller B HI JOHN ITS ME FRED. I AM WONDERING WHAT YOU ARE DOING TONIGHT? GA
Caller A HI FRED. I AM THINKING OF HAVING A POKER NIGHT AT MINE, WHAT DO YOU THINK? GA
Caller B GOOD IDEA, I'LL CALL A FEW MATES TO COME ROUND AND HAVE A GOOD GAME GA
Caller A OK SEE YOU AT 7PM. BYE BYE SK GA
Caller B OK SEE YOU AT 7PM BYE BYE SKSKSKSK GA
Caller A THANK YOU FOR USING TEXT RELAY SERVICE. GOODBYE

Note: TTYs use only capital letters except when there are computer screens.
Note: In the UK, Text relay service used to be called typetalk (RNID) but have since merged with the phone line using the dialling prefix 18001 (TTY) or the 18002 (voice relay). The emergency line is 18000 (TTY).

== TRS relay ==
One of the most common uses for a TTY is to place calls to a Telecommunications Relay Service (TRS), which makes it possible for the deaf to successfully make phone calls to users of regular phone systems.

The voice recognition systems are in limited use, due to problems with the technology. A new development called the captioned telephone now uses voice recognition to assist the human operators. Newer text-based communication methods, such as short message service (SMS), Internet Relay Chat (IRC), and instant messaging, have also been adopted by the deaf as an alternative or adjunct to TTY.

== See also ==
- List of video telecommunication services and product brands
- Telecommunications relay service
- Video relay service (VRS), using videotelephony
