= James C. Marsters =

American orthodontist (1924–2009)

James Carlyle Marsters (April 5, 1924 – July 28, 2009) was a deaf orthodontist in Pasadena, California, who in 1964 helped invent the first teletypewriter device capable of being used with telephone lines. The device made communication by telephone possible for the deaf. Although Robert Weitbrecht did much of the actual design work, Marsters promoted the device's use.

== Early life and career ==
Marsters was born April 5, 1924, in Norwich, New York, to pharmaceutical executive Guy Marsters and his wife Anna Belle, a nurse.

When he was very young, Marsters lost his hearing to scarlet fever and measles. However, he learned to speak and to read lips. He graduated from Wright Oral School for the Deaf in New York City in 1943. It was there that he met John Tracy, the son of Spencer Tracy. In 1947 Marsters received a chemistry degree from Union College in Schenectady, New York.

Marsters married Joan Tausik, an artist who was also deaf (they later divorced), and went to work in her father's tie factory. It was Tausik's father who suggested he should become a dentist. Though Marsters' test scores were high, dental schools rejected him because of his deafness. After two and a half years of applying, New York University agreed to admit him on a provisional basis with the understanding that he would receive no special assistance. He graduated from New York University in 1952. He used to claim he could hear some, to help calm the fears of some of his dental school professors. He also flew an airplane between two cities where he practiced, and he would claim his radio wasn't working right and ask air traffic controllers to use lights to guide him.

John Tracy, whose name is on a Los Angeles clinic for hearing-impaired children encouraged Marsters to become an orthodontist, and in 1954, after studies at USC, he began his Pasadena practice. Soon after that, he married Alice Amelia Dorsey, the director of the clinic at John Tracy Clinic's preschool. Marsters had three children—James Marsters Jr., a chemist; Jean Marsters, a doctor; and Guy Marsters, a musician. Alice died in 2003. The couple had two grandchildren. Marsters died July 28, 2009, of a heart ailment.

== Role in developing the Teletypewriter ==
When Marsters received a phone call, he depended on others to answer the phone and mouth the words to him so he could read lips, after which he would reply on the telephone. At the time, there was a TTY network for business, but it was too expensive for individuals. Marsters approached Robert Weitbrecht a deaf physicist of Stanford Research Institute and suggested he look into creating a device that would allow the deaf to communicate with teletypewriters across the phone lines.

=== Teletypewriter Prototype ===
Weitbrecht believed an acoustic coupler (now known as a modem) could be used to convert electrical signals into tones that could be sent through wires. On the receiving end, the tones changed back to electrical signals so the message could be printed. After communicating with Marsters, Weitbrecht developed an echo suppressing acoustic coupler in November 1963 for the purpose of using on TTY devices. They obtained old, salvaged teletypewriters machines from Western Union and the Defense Department and hooked them up to Weitbrecht's prototype modems.

In 1964, Weitbrecht succeeded in using the device to make a long-distance telephone call, to Marsters. It took several tries, until Weitbrecht's words appeared clearly: "Are you printing me now? Let's quit for now and gloat over the success." Together with engineer Andrew Saks (also deaf), whose grandfather started Saks Fifth Avenue, Marsters and Weitbrecht created The Applied Communications Corporation of Belmont, California to manufacture the modem. Marsters persuaded deaf people to try the new device, using donated teletypewriters which deaf volunteers fixed up, delivered and installed in deaf homes. He also went to hospitals and fire departments, asking them to install the devices for emergency communication. Jean Marsters, his daughter, said her father "was the public speaker, the can-do man who wouldn't take no for an answer."

Before this could be done, the telephone company had to agree to allow the use of the device across the telephone lines. At that time the phone company owned the phone lines and all telephones (which were rented to consumers), and they opposed this new technology. Bill Saks, Andrew's son, said

people don't realize it, but Ma Bell had absolute control over how her instruments were used, and there were draconian consequences for ... attaching anything to their devices. The phone companies were the Goliaths. Those three gentlemen were the Davids.

Marsters and other deaf advocates had to go to Washington to lobby for TTY communication to become legalized. Four years later in 1968, the Federal Communications Commission required AT&T to allow the use of the devices provided they did not cause problems to the phone company's operations. This removed the last obstacle to what became a deaf telecommunications revolution.

According to Harry G. Lang, a professor at the National Technical Institute for the Deaf in Rochester, New York, "It was a technological declaration of independence for deaf people." Marsters' son Jim Marsters Jr. said that his father was modest, claiming, "The glory is not mine. It was an effort of many." RIT gave Marsters an honorary doctorate in 1996 and put Marsters' modem used for that first TTY call on display at Wallace Memorial Library. Marsters served on NTID's advisory board and, in 2000, established a scholarship for persons with hearing impairment.

=== Teletypewriter Continued Use ===
Telecommunications for the Deaf and Hard of Hearing, Inc. (TDI) began awarding the James C. Marsters Promotion Award for those who helped provide access for those with disabilities.

The number of TTY devices increased from 18 in 1966, author Karen Peltz Strauss said, to 30,000 40 years later. The Internet probably resulted in a decline in the devices' use after a peak in the 1990s, she said.

TTY's could only communicate with other TTY's until the late 1960s when Marsters and Saks developed the idea of having phone company operators take TTY message and relay them by voice to hearing phones, and vice versa. One early attempt at this did not last because of the cost and the noise the machines made, but the concept led to a requirement of a similar service in the Americans with Disabilities Act in 1990 which is available nationwide today.

The Internet has replaced the TTY for the most part, but emergency services continue to use it.
