= CyraCom Language Solutions =

US Translation and Interpretation Services Company

- Industry: Language services
- Founded: 1995
- Founder: Kevin J. Carey and Mark Myers
- Revenue: 109,600,000 United States dollar (2015)
- Website: cyracom.com

CyraCom International, Inc. is an American language services company that provides over-the-phone and video interpretation and language assessment services. It is the largest provider of telephone interpretation services in the United States.

The company is headquartered in Tucson, Arizona.

== History ==
CyraCom was originally founded as Kevmark Industries in 1995 by Kevin J. Carey and Mark Myers. Myers and co-founder Kevin Carey built a prototype with two handsets connected to a single base, allowing both patients and providers to speak to an interpreter on a three-way call without passing a handset back and forth. The device later became known as the CyraPhone.

The company name was changed to CyraCom in 1997, named for Edmond Rostand's Cyrano de Bergerac. It operates call centers and offices in the United States with one office in the United Kingdom, Costa Rica and Mexico. Cyracom provides interpreters for hundreds of languages.

CyraCom acquired Washington, D.C. based Language Learning Enterprises in January 2010.

On july 3rd, 2025 Propio Language Services announced that they acquired Cyracom Language Solutions.
