= Ed Bosson =

American inventor

Dr "Ed" Bosson is best known for his invention of the Video Relay Service which has provided the ability to connect between hearing and deaf communities through the means of video and sign language interpreters. Bosson then went on a long career as an administrator for the Texas Public Utilities Commission (PUC).

David Myers, who was executive director of Texas Commission for the Deaf (now inactive) in an open meeting of Texas Public Commission to borrow Ed Bosson to underwrite a bill for specialized telecommunication assistance program (STAP). PUC approved it. Bosson underwent dozen of interviews of Texas Legislators and underwrote STAP bill that ultimately was approved by Texas Legislators.

After his retirement in 2008, Bosson formed an advocacy based website, bringing the issues to the deaf community regarding the Telecommunications Relay Service which includes Video Relay Service and traditional TTY Relay Service.

== Early life ==
Bosson was born in Hot Springs, Arkansas, was educated at Arkansas School for the Deaf and graduated in 1961. He then attended Gallaudet University and finished with a major in psychology in 1966.

When Ed became deaf when he was one, his parents were unsure of which education system Ed should go; oralism or American sign language. His mother, Eva Elizabeth Bosson, decided on a compromise so, during Bosson's childhood, his parents asked a deaf family with a deaf son named Race Drake if they would let Bosson visit the deaf family from time to time to learn sign language. A strong friendship was formed between Race Drake and Ed Bosson. Ed learned the true culture of the Deaf world thus making it easier for Ed to be immersed into the deaf world, become fluent in American Sign Language, be part of education at Arkansas School for the Deaf, and attend Gallaudet University (the only university in the world that focuses on deaf students).

== Father of Video Relay Service ==
Ed Bosson who was Texas's first state relay administrator with the Texas Public Utility Commission (PUC) had envisioned Deaf people communicating with videophones more than 10 years before the FCC mandated it nationwide. At the early years of 1990, Ed contacted Mark Seeger who was the manager for Texas Sprint Relay and discussed the possibilities. Mark contacted Sprint technicians to see if Ed’s vision was feasible. They reported that it was, so Ed brought the idea to the Texas PUC. It took Ed a long time to be able to convince the PUC and get some help from a lawyer in interpreting the TRS regulation that VRS is functionally equivalent to what hearing persons enjoy with a regular telephone system. First, Ed convinced his supervisor and then one-by-one, the Commissioners, that video relay should become a part of statewide Telecom Relay Service offerings. Ed also enlisted political support from state organizations such as Texas Association of the Deaf/Hard-of-Hearing and Coalition for the Disabilities. PUC Commissioners then authorized Ed to manage the first video relay service trials. Sprint was the first service provider to conduct the Texas video relay tests. Bosson would later receive national awards from Smithsonian Computerworld, the Gallaudet Alumni, Gallaudet University and TDI for his work with VRS.

For Ed's advocacy service over the years, Gallaudet awarded him with an honorary doctorate degree on May 16, 2008.

== Advocacy ==
In 1989, Texas Association of the Deaf formed a lobbying committee to advocate a bill of Relay Texas and Eileen Alter was the coordinator (selected by the TADspent Board) of this committee. Bosson was one of the members of the committee. Bosson along with Eileen spent 30 to 35 hours a week attending the Texas Capitol and talked with many legislators. The lobbying was successful as the bill was passed.

"In 1989, the Texas Legislature adopted House Bill 174, mandating the Public Utility Commission of Texas (PUC) to establish a statewide telecommunications relay service to provide telephone network access for individuals who are deaf, hard-of-hearing, deaf and blind, or speech-impaired. This service, known as "Relay Texas" stated on September 1, 1990 and is funded by the Texas Universal Services Fund (TUSF)." Source: https://www.puc.texas.gov/relaytexas/Overview.aspx

Bosson with Relay Texas Committee (affiliated with TPUC) introduced many innovative features of Relay Texas that ultimately Relay Texas became the flagship of what telecommunications relay service ought to be.

Over the period, Video Relay Service industry was and is regulated by FCC, however, interests from the corporates generally determined its regulations and the focus was shifted from consumer towards business. During the same period, Bosson created a website called "Ed's Alert".. As of April 2011, edsalert had 76,000 hits. Ed's Alert website now is in no longer in use.

== Convo Communications ==
On March 20, 2009, Bosson returned from his retirement into the private sector of the Video Relay Service industry partnering up with Robin Horwitz, Wayne Betts, Jr, and Chad Taylor to form Convo Communications. Bosson started as a vice-president of the Regulatory department and held to it 3 years before retiring fully and confined himself to brainstorming with Convo management. In the end, Bosson sold all his shares of Convo as of July 2018.
