= Total conversation =

Total conversation is an ITU standard of simultaneous video, voice and text service in telecommunications. Total conversation allows people in two or more locations to: (a) see each other, (b) hear each other, and (c) conduct a text interaction (real-time text) with each other, or choose to communicate with any combination of those three modes and to do so in real-time.

The standard was defined in ITU-T recommendation F.703 of 2000 as "an audiovisual conversation service providing bidirectional symmetric real-time transfer of motion video, text and voice between users in two or more locations".

== Application ==
- Conference call for businesses will need to use audio and text and may use video to share documents.
- Deaf people using sign language would be more than satisfied to call each other with video.
- Deaf people using sign language can also call, and be called by hearing people using Video Relay Service.
- Hard of hearing people to call each other directly with voice and text and even video for lip-reading.
- Hard of hearing and deaf people who do not use sign language (orally and late deafened) need to access a Text Relay Service with an audio plus text call in order to be able to speak but also to receive captions.
- Text-only call is the only way to make a call for deaf-blind user using Braille display.
- Text call mixed to audio feedback is the only way to make a call for speech disabled user
- video, text and audio combined call is the only suitable way to make a call for cognitive disabled user.
- Text only call might be convenient in situation when audio communication is not permitted, available or dangerous (noisy situation, low bandwidth).
- Support and hot line might be contacted with an audio-only call and add a video stream if there is a need to show the actual issue the user is facing on a device.

== Universal design ==
Total conversation is a straightforward application of universal design principles applied to telecommunication field. This standard brings communication services to the broadest range of population including deaf people, hard of hearing people but also people who have speech impairment, people with cognitive impairment, elderly people, children, and also ... regular users. It is an enhancement of call services that provides a better experience to all. Total conversation uses video, text and audio. These media can be combined or not depending on the type of profile used : many user profiles have to be taken into account. Such methodology is named Universal Design.

== Implementation of the standard ==
=== Available implementations ===
A number of European companies including 4CTel, Aupix, IVèS, nWise, Omnitor, and Orange Labs produced implementations. These are mostly used to provide user-to-user calls and relay services for deaf and hard of hearing people.

=== REACH112 ===
Total conversation was piloted in a European project called REACH112, named after the 1-1-2 European emergency number, whose purpose was to carry out test deployment of total conversation in a live environment with several thousands users and for three usages:

- European wide person to person calls
- Total Conversation Relay Services for deaf people
- Total Conversation used for emergency calls.

=== Specifications ===
Total conversation specifications describe:

- An interconnection interface between total conversation service providers including relay services.
- A user to network interface for videophone manufacturers.
- A call interface for Next Generation Emergency Services in Europe Europe including an information sharing capability.

Total conversation defines three basic services

- seamless multimedia person to person calls including the ability to call regular telephone users.
- the ability to invoke a relay service by deaf or hard of hearing persons,
- the ability to call emergency services in total conversation mode.

Example of technical protocols used by total conversation are:

- Session Initiation Protocol for call signalling,
- T.140 with an RFC 4103. for real-time text (RTT)
- Video codecs H.263 and preferably H.264.
- Audio codec ITU-T G.711 and other as commonly used in VoIP calls.

(* Use of Common Alerting Protocol may be also considered to share information with Emergency Services.)

== Over instant messaging ==
AOL Instant Messenger supports the simultaneous use of audio, video, and real-time text via the "Real-Time IM" feature. This would be considered compliant with Total Conversation.

For other chat networks such as Google Talk, the XMPP protocol technically allow for total conversation by combining multiple XMPP Extensions, such as XEP-0266 audio, XEP-0299 video, and XEP-0301 real-time text. As of December 2011, Google Talk only supports audio/video, but not real-time text yet. But Google Talk has been terminated in 2022

Skype has been supporting simultaneous audio, video, and real-time text.

== IP multimedia subsystem ==
Total conversation basically provides a multi-media call services with specific media enabled. The currently most common implementation environment is native SIP as described above.

Total conversation can also be implemented in other call control environments. One such environment is IP Multimedia Subsystem (IMS) in its IMS multimedia telephony service.

Firstly, total conversation can be defined as a pragmatic selection of existing standards related to Session Initiation Protocol with the selection of audio, video and text codecs. It is a private initiative of services provider and technology vendors seeking interoperability in the broadtest sense.

Secondly, this can apply to existing and deployed SIP platform rather than future or next generation networks.

Thirdly, IMS is much more ambitious and define a whole architecture, including all internal interfaces and billing and physical infrastructure. These standards are more suitable for large telecommunication operators and their equipment vendors. This complexity has consequences:

- Very little UMTS release 5 networks fully supporting IMS are in production
- Multimedia call services defined by MMTEL are not translated in actual usable services on the market. An industry led initiative called Rich Communication Suite finally plans to do this .. when IMS will be rolled out in the networks.
- Rolling out a Native SIP Total Conversation services needs investments that are very reduced compared to the IMS equivalent. However, the implementations in both environments are close enough that interoperability between the two is an easy task.
