= Weitbrecht Communications =

US company making products for the deaf

Weitbrecht Communications, Inc.
- Founded: 1965
- Founder: Robert Weitbrecht and James C. Marsters
- Headquarters: Santa Monica, California, United States
- Website: www.weitbrecht.com

Weitbrecht Communications, Inc. (WCI) is a Santa Monica, California company that specializes in providing products for deaf people. The company was founded as Applied Communications around 1965 by Robert Weitbrecht and James C. Marsters based on Weitbrecht's invention of the teleprinter at SRI International (then Stanford Research Institute).
