= Communication access real-time translation =

Speech to text conversion system

Communication access realtime translation (CART), also called open captioning or realtime stenography or simply realtime captioning, is the general name of the system that stenographers and others use to convert speech to text. A trained operator writes the exact words spoken using a special phonetic keyboard, or stenography methods, relaying a reliable and accurate translation that is broadcast to the recipient on a screen, laptop, or other device. CART professionals have qualifications for added expertise (speed and accuracy) as compared to court reporters and other stenographers.

Speech-to-text software is used by voice writers to provide CART.

CART is useful for making communication accessible to those who are deaf or hard of hearing, as realtime speech-to-text serves many with hearing loss and deafness. Captioning is mandated by the Americans with Disabilities Act (ADA) as an auxiliary aid or service. CART is a viable option to use in conjunction with or instead of a sign language interpreter, however, the decision made about which medium should be used should be based on the needs of the individuals who require the service. In schools with deaf and hard-of-hearing students, CART is used in the classroom: the provider types using stenography, and the students see the words on a screen enabling them to follow along in class and not be left behind. The cost of CART services ranges from $60 to $200 per hour. Because of this, some people look to Automatic Speech Recognition (ASR) as a more cost effective service. However, ASR is not as accurate and can be delayed in response, making it less useful in classroom situations. CART can also be useful for people whose first language is different from the language being used, to understand speakers with different voices and accents in many group situations (at work, in education, community events), to have a "transcript', and for learning languages.

Remote CART is done with the trained operator at a remote location. A voice connection such as a telephone, cellphone, or computer microphone is used to send the voice to the operator, and the realtime text is transmitted back over a modem, Internet, or other data connection.

In some countries, CART may be referred to as Palantype, Velotype, STTR (speech-to-text reporting).
