= Real-time text =

Text transmitted instantly as it is typed or created

Real-time text (RTT) is text transmitted instantly as it is typed or created. Recipients can immediately read the message while it is being written, without waiting.

Real-time text is used for conversational text, in collaboration, and in live captioning. Technologies include TDD/TTY devices for the deaf, live captioning for TV, Text over IP (ToIP), some types of instant messaging, captioning for telephony/video teleconferencing, telecommunications relay services including ip-relay, transcription services including Remote CART, TypeWell, collaborative text editing, streaming text applications, next-generation 9-1-1/1-1-2 emergency service. Obsolete TDD/TTY devices are being replaced by more modern real-time text technologies, including Text over IP, IP relay, and instant messaging.

== Use over instant messaging ==
While standard instant messaging is not real-time text (messages are sent deliberately when the writer is ready, not transmitted while they are being composed), a real-time text option is found in some instant messaging software, including AOL Instant Messenger's "Real-Time IM" feature. Real-time text is also possible over any XMPP compatible chat networks, including those used by Apple iChat, Cisco WebEx, and Google Talk, by using appropriate software that has a real-time text feature. When present in IM programs, the real-time text feature can be turned on/off, just like other chat features such as audio. Real-time text programs date at least to the 1970s, with the talk program on the DEC PDP-11, which remains in use on Unix systems.

Beam Messenger, a mobile app offering real-time text messaging, was released in 2014.

Certain real-time text applications have a feature that allows the real-time text to be "turned off" for temporary purposes. This allows the sender to pre-compose the message as a standard IM or text message before transmitting.

== Use by the deaf ==
Real-time text is frequently used by the deaf, including IP-Relay services, TDD/TTY devices, and Text over IP. Real-time text allows the other person to read immediately, without waiting for the sender to finish composing their sentence/message. This allows conversational use of text, much like a hearing person can listen to someone speaking in real time.

== Captioned telephony ==
Captioned telephony is the streaming of real-time text captions in parallel with speech on a phone call. This is used by people who are hard of hearing to allow them to have the full benefit of listening as best they can, hearing all the intonation etc. in speech, yet have the captions for those words they cannot hear clearly enough. In the United States, captioned telephony is one of the free relay services that is available to anyone who is hard-of-hearing. Originally developed for use on the analog phone systems (where it requires a special phone) it is now available over IP using standard devices.

== Use in collaboration ==
Collaborative real-time editing is the utilization of real-time text for shared editing, rather than for conversation. Split-screen chat, where conversational text appears continuously, is also considered real-time text. Some examples that provide this as a service are Apache Wave and its fork SwellRT, Etherpad, the editor Gobby, and most notably Google Docs.

== Captioning, transcriptions and other uses ==
Real-time text is used in closed captioning and when captions are being streamed live continuously during live events. Transcription services including Communication Access Real-Time Translation and TypeWell frequently use real-time text, where text is streamed live to a remote display. This is used in court reporting, and is also used by deaf attendees at a conference. Also, real-time text provides an enhancement to text messaging on mobile phones, via real-time texting apps.

== Real-time text protocols ==
Real-time text protocols include Text over IP (ToIP) designed around ITU-T T.140, IETF RFC 4103, RFC 5194, and XMPP Extension Protocol XEP-0301.

== Total conversation ==
According to ITU-T Multimedia Recommendation F.703, total conversation defines the simultaneous use of audio, video and real-time text. An instant messaging program that can enable all three features simultaneously would be compliant. Real-time text is an important part of it.

== History ==
Real-time text is also historically found in the old UNIX talk, BBS software such as Celerity BBS, and older versions of ICQ messaging software.

== See also ==
- Collaborative real-time editor
- Text over IP
