= LanguageLine Solutions =

American translation company based in Monterey, California

- Industry: translation, localisation, interpreting, commercial translations, machine translation technology, legal translation, financial translation, ASL interpreting, BSL interpreting, video interpreting, certified translation, document translation, AI translation, AI interpreting
- Founded: 1982; 44 years ago
- Headquarters: Monterey, United States
- Key people: Simon Yoxon-Grant (President and CEO)
- Number of employees: 35,000+ (2025)
- Parent: Teleperformance
- Website: www.languageline.com

LanguageLine Solutions is an American company headquartered in Monterey, California, with a strong UK presence provided by their London, UK offices. It provides on-demand and onsite language interpretation and document translation services worldwide for law enforcement, healthcare organizations, legal courts, schools, and businesses in over 290 languages. LanguageLine claims to have more than 30,000 clients. LanguageLine is the largest interpretation services provider in the world.

The company's global workforce is claimed to include over 25,000 interpreters who handle more than 87 million calls each year.

In addition to phone interpreting, the company also offers video remote and onsite interpreting, translation and localization services, and language proficiency testing and training.

== Competitors ==
They compete with other language specialists like Straker translations, One Planet, and Spot On Interpreting.

== Company history ==
In its earlier years, the company was known as CALL (Communication And Language Line) and was formed by Jeff Munks and Michael McFerrin. Jeff Munks was a San Jose, California, policeman Michael McFerrin mastered the Vietnamese language as a US Marine stationed in Vietnam during the Vietnam War. He returned to Northern California and worked as a refugee advocate. The two men founded Language Line Services in 1982 to help police officers communicate with 65,000 Vietnamese refugees.

AT&T acquired the service on February 14, 1990, as a strategic business unit. AT&T Language Line Services received significant investments in technology and interpreter quality, creating standards for the emerging telephone interpreting industry. For a decade, the company served as a vital resource for business, government and health care clients who faced changing demographics and state and federal laws and regulations in the 1990s.

In 1999, the company became an independent entity, today known as LanguageLine Solutions. In addition to phone interpreting, the company also began offering video remote and onsite interpreting, translation and localization services, and language proficiency testing and training.

In 2006, the company acquired Language Line in the UK, which had been founded in 1995 by social entrepreneur Michael Young. At that time it was the largest telephone interpreting business in Europe.

Scott W. Klein was named CEO on June 21, 2012.

On September 16, 2016, LanguageLine Solutions was acquired by Teleperformance, a French company. Teleperformance has stated that LanguageLine will continue to operate as a stand-alone business, headquartered in Monterey, California.

== Unpaid Wages ==
LanguageLine Solutions was ordered in 2015 by the US government to pay nearly $1.5 million in missed wages, back pay, and damages to over 2,400 interpreters. According to the US Department of Labor, LanguageLine Solutions was in violation of the Fair Labor Standards Act (FLSA) and the McNamara–O’Hara Service Contract Act (SCA).
