= Telecommunications for the Deaf, Inc. =

U.S. nonprofit organization

TDI
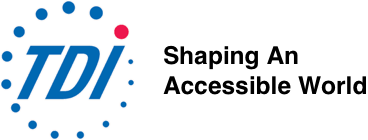
- Founded: 1968
- Purpose: Deaf issues, promote equal accessibility
- Location: Silver Spring, Maryland, United States
- Region served: United States of America
- Method: Donations and Grants
- Key people: Eric Kaika, Chief Executive Officer; Jan Withers, President
- Website: www.TDIforAccess.org

TDI (originally known as Telecommunications for the Deaf and Hard of Hearing, Inc.) is a 501(c)(3) nonprofit organization headquartered in Silver Spring, Maryland, and was founded in 1968. Its original purpose was to promote the widespread distribution of telecommunications devices for the deaf (TTY) and publish a telephone directory of those that used TTY. The organization has evolved to serve as an advocate of equal access in telecom and media for deaf and hard of hearing people. In the 1990s and 2000s, this included encouraging pay telephone providers to incorporate TTY keyboards into pay telephones. The organization's advocacy efforts include lobbying the Federal Communications Commission for better and more intuitive caption display settings on a variety of devices and services.
