= Robert Weitbrecht =

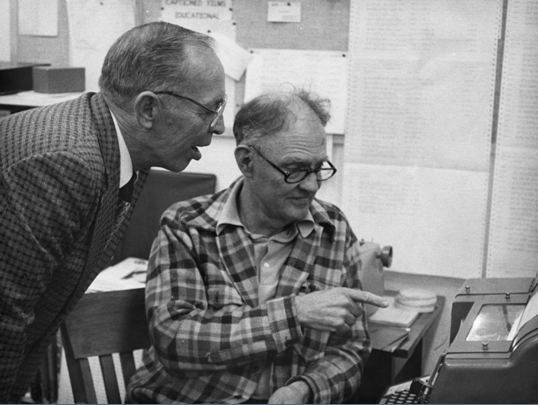
- Dr. Weitbrecht shows off his TTY device.
- Born: April 11, 1920; Orange, California
- Died: May 19, 1983 (aged 63)
- Education: University of California, Berkeley; University of Chicago
- Awards: 1971 Laurent Clerc Award
- Scientific career
- Workplaces: SRI International; Weitbrecht Communications

Robert Haig Weitbrecht (1920-1983) was an engineer at SRI International and later the spin-off company Weitbrecht Communications who invented a type of a modem (a form of acoustic coupler).

== Early life and education ==
Weitbrecht was born in Orange, California in 1920. He was born Deaf and his education was mainstream for the most part with the exception of acquiring some signing and lip-reading skills from a Deaf school early on. He went on to earn a B.S. in Astronomy from the University of California, Berkeley in 1942 and finished his formal education with a M.S. in Astronomy from the University of Chicago in 1957.

== Career ==
Weitbrecht was initially a physicist at the Radiation Laboratory at the University of California (now Lawrence Livermore National Laboratory), then an electronics scientist at the U.S. Naval Air Missile Test Center. For his efforts, he earned the United States Navy's Superior Accomplishment Award.

Even in his high school days, Weitbrecht was interested in amateur radio and used radiotelegraph to communicate with fellow radio operators around the country. In 1964, this love for communication came together with the need to interact with a colleague who could not operate an amateur radio. To solve this problem, Weitbrecht created a device that used the public telephone system to achieve communication: the teletypewriter (TTY).

After being approached by James C. Marsters, Weitbrecht came up with a revised design for the acoustic coupler (a type of modem), which used echo suppression. In 1964, Marsters and Weitbrecht adapted used teletypewriter equipment, and Weitbrecht made the first successful teletypewriter phone call from one deaf person to another. It took several tries, until Weitbrecht's words appeared clearly: "Are you printing now? Let's quit for now and gloat over the success." Today, this type of device is known as a telecommunications device for the deaf.

== Personal life ==
Weitbrecht earned a pilot's license in 1967. Weitbrecht died after being involved in an automobile accident in 1983.
