= Video remote interpreting =

Communication service

A video interpreter sign used in several countries for locations offering VRS or VRI services

Video remote interpreting (VRI) is a videotelecommunication service that uses devices such as web cameras or videophones to provide sign language or spoken language interpreting services. This is done through a remote or offsite interpreter, in order to communicate with persons with whom there is a communication barrier. It is similar to a slightly different technology called video relay service, where the parties are each located in different places. VRI is a type of telecommunications relay service (TRS) that is not regulated by the FCC.

== Method of use ==
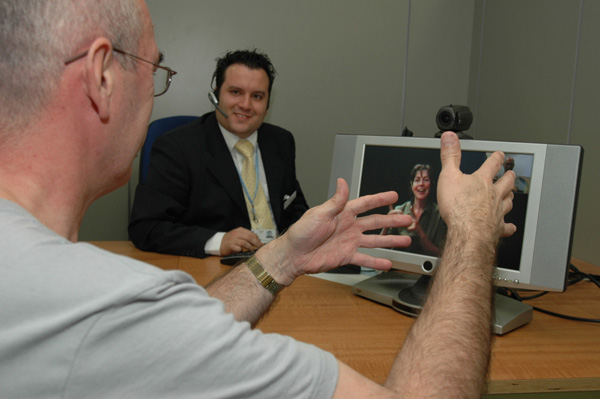
A video interpreter assisting an on-screen client.

In a typical VRI situation, the two parties are located together at one location with a videophone or web camera, and a television or computer screen. The interpreter works from another location—either an office, home-based studio or call center—also using a videophone or web camera and television or computer screen. The equipment must provide video and audio connectivity, or a separate telephone line can be used for audio. The video interpreter facilitates communication between the participants who are located together at the other site. In the case of signed language interpretation (such as American Sign Language), the interpreter hears the voices of the hearing people through the microphone or telephone, and renders the message into sign language, via a video camera, which the deaf person views on his or her video display. In turn, when the deaf participants sign to the camera, interpreters view it from their screen, and speaks the aural interpretation into a microphone or telephone for the hearing people.

=== VRI versus Video Relay Service ===
VRI is distinct from Video Relay Service (VRS). Typically VRI is a contracted service used by organizations to help them communicate with Limited English Proficient or deaf and hard of hearing customers. VRS is principally a service provided to the deaf community, whereby a deaf person can contact the service, and use the interpreter to contact a third-party organization. In the past, the term 'video relay service' had been used interchangeably with 'video relay interpreting', but currently the terms refer to two separate and distinct services. However, a 'video interpreter' (V.I.) may refer to the practitioner working in either setting.

VRS in the United States receives funding from telecommunications relay service taxes. According to U.S. Federal Communications Commission (FCC) regulations, deaf and hearing people in the same room are not permitted to use VRS to communicate, because the service is designated only for telephone calls. In the United States, the FCC requires that if a VRS interpreter determines callers are in the same location, they must advise both parties that the interpreter must terminate the call. VRI however, can either be provided for persons in the same location, or different locations, as long as the parties can see or hear the interpreter respectively, and vice versa.

== History and Deployment Examples ==
In 2010, Chicago's Mercy Hospital and Medical Center carried out an investigation into new ways that the hospital could effectively meet the needs of its deaf and hard of hearing patients, with the ultimate goal to improve patient care and satisfaction, increase hospital efficiency and provide better value for money for all. Their conclusion focused on implementing an on-demand VRI service whereby hospital staff were able to access qualified, experienced Registry of Interpreters for the Deaf (RID) / National Association of the Deaf (NAD) certified American Sign Language interpreters via the Internet with delays as short as minutes. Dedicated laptop computers were made available for use by clinicians and, to this day, the service is utilized across the hospital's departments. Notably the hospital has measured tangible results in increased patient flow and overall satisfaction.

In June 2011, the Windsor, Ontario, Canada, Police Service piloted a VRI service aimed at improving communication with the deaf, hard of hearing and people with other language barriers. The 30-day trial was deployed in the Emergency 911 Center, and proved so successful that they went on to incorporate the program into their Windsor Police Service Human Rights Project as a way of expanding services to people who are deaf or are Limited English Proficient. The cost to Windsor Police Services at that time was $50 per month and $3.25 per minute of use.

== Legal Aspects ==
As VRI seeks to provide a communication accommodation, its use is widely regulated under civil rights law including disability rights law.

=== United States ===
In the United States, there are relevant federal laws and litigation focused on the use of VRI.

- Americans with Disabilities Act
- Patient Protection and Affordable Care Act: Section 1557, the non-discrimination provision, of the Affordable Care Act provides protections for patients who require communication accommodations.
- Silva v. Baptist Health S Florida, Inc. (No. 19-12386)
  "However, the plaintiffs presented substantial evidence that during their visits between 2009 and 2014], the VRI machines routinely failed to facilitate effective communication. Sometimes the VRI picture would be choppy, unclear, or would cut out, and sometimes the VRI machine failed to operate at all. In Silva (the court's earlier 2017 decision), we described how the malfunctioning of the VRI machines "could generate a reasonable inference of an impaired informational exchange" that was likely to occur each time Plaintiffs visited Baptist's hospitals. Given that Plaintiffs "routinely" experienced these VRI malfunctions at Baptist's hospitals over a period of several years, a jury could reasonably infer that hospital staff knew that the continued reliance on VRI as an interpretive aid, without correcting its deficiencies, was "substantially likely" to result in the impaired informational exchange experienced by Plaintiffs (Jebian, intending to decline the use of VRI at Baptist's hospitals, "acted reasonably in anticipating that the VRI would not facilitate effective communication"). A jury could thus conclude that Plaintiffs experienced instances of ineffective communication as a result of a "deliberate choice" by Baptist officials, rather than mere negligence."
- Settlement, United States of America v. Adventist Health System Georgia, Inc. (Jan. 2, 2022):
  "VRI shall not be used when it is not likely to ensure effective communication, for example, due to: (1) a Patient's limited ability to move his or head, hands, or arms; vision or cognitive issues; significant pain; or because the Patient cannot be properly positioned to see the screen: (2) space limitations in the room: (3) communications with the Patient or Companion and Medical Personnel reflect that the complexity of the medical issue requires an on-site interpreter; or (4) any other time when there are indicators that VRI will likely nor or is not providing effective communication with a Patient or Companion, VRI shall not be used as a substitute for an on-site Qualified Interpreter. If VRI is initiated but does not provide effective communication, an on-site Qualified Interpreter shall be provided in accordance with the timetable set forth in Paragraph 25."

== Controversy ==
There is considerable discussion on the appropriateness of when to use VRI. One popular application is in the hospital emergency room. In this setting, it is essential that patients and caregivers communicate readily with medical personnel, but it may take time for a face-to-face interpreter to arrive onsite. Hospitals with VRI capability can connect with a remote interpreter quickly and conduct triage and intake surveys with the patient or caregiver without significant delay. Also, employees who work in office settings are increasingly converting to VRI services to accommodate brief interactions or regular meetings which would be difficult to schedule with an onsite interpreter. Schools and businesses located in areas not adequately served by existing community interpreters can also benefit from increased access to professional interpreters and save the expense of vendor travel reimbursements.

Using VRI for medical, legal and mental health settings is seen as controversial by people in deaf communities because it does not provide adequate communication access —particularly in medical settings. In a nationwide survey of deaf people who use American Sign Language, researchers found that only 41% of people who used VRI were satisfied with communicating through the VRI. This finding has been supported by other research indicating that medical providers ignore deaf patients' requests for in-person interpreters, forcing patients to use VRI. There are also significant issues with the technical capabilities of VRI, with patients reporting medical staff being unaware on how to operate VRI machinery, leading to it being unsuccessful.

== See also ==
- Language interpretation
- List of video telecommunication services and product brands
- Telecommunications relay service
- Video relay service, where the hearing party is situated at a different location from the signing person
- Videoconferencing
- Videophone
- Videotelephony
- Webcam
