= Video relay service =

Video telecommunication service

A Video Interpreter sign used at locations offering VRS or VRI services.

A video relay service (VRS), also sometimes mistaken for video interpreting service (VIS), is a video telecommunication service that allows deaf, hard-of-hearing, and speech-impaired (D-HOH-SI) individuals to communicate over video telephones and similar technologies with hearing people in real-time, via a sign language interpreter.

A similar video interpreting service called video remote interpreting (VRI) is conducted through a different organization often called a "Video Interpreting Service Provider" (VISP).

VRS is a newer form of telecommunication service to the D-HOH-SI community, which had, in the United States, started earlier in 1974 using a simpler non-video technology called telecommunications relay service, also known as "TRS", or simply as "relay service".

VRS services have become well developed nationally in Sweden since 1997 and also in the United States since 2003. With the exception of Sweden, VRS has been provided in Europe for only a few years since the mid-2000s, and as of 2010 has not been made available in many European Union countries, with most European countries still lacking the legislation or the financing for large-scale VRS services, and to provide the necessary telecommunication equipment to deaf users. France, Germany and the Nordic countries are among the other leaders in Europe, while the United States is another world leader in the provisioning of VRS services.

== Telecommunications-facilitated signing ==
One of the first demonstrations of the ability for telecommunications to help sign language users communicate with each other occurred when AT&T's videophone (trademarked as the "Picturephone") was introduced to the public at the 1964 New York World's Fair –two deaf users were able to communicate freely with each other between the fair and another city. Various universities and other organizations, including British Telecom's Martlesham facility, have also conducted extensive research on signing via videotelephony. The use of sign language via videotelephony was hampered for many years due to the difficulty of its use over slow analogue copper phone lines, coupled with the high cost of better quality ISDN (data) phone lines. Those factors largely disappeared with the introduction of more efficient video codecs and the advent of lower cost high-speed ISDN data and IP (Internet) services in the 1990s.

=== 21st century developments ===
Significant improvements in video call quality of service for the deaf occurred in the United States in 2003 when Sorenson Media Inc. (formerly Sorenson Vision Inc.), a video compression software coding company, developed its VP-100 model stand-alone videophone specifically for the deaf community. It was designed to output its video to the user's television in order to lower the cost of acquisition, and to offer remote control and a powerful video compression codec for unequaled video quality and ease of use with video relay services. Favourable reviews quickly led to its popular usage at educational facilities for the deaf, and from there to the greater deaf community.

Coupled with similar high-quality videophones introduced by other electronics manufacturers, the availability of high speed Internet, and sponsored video relay services authorized by the U.S. Federal Communications Commission in 2002, VRS services for the deaf underwent rapid growth in that country.

=== Present-day usage ===
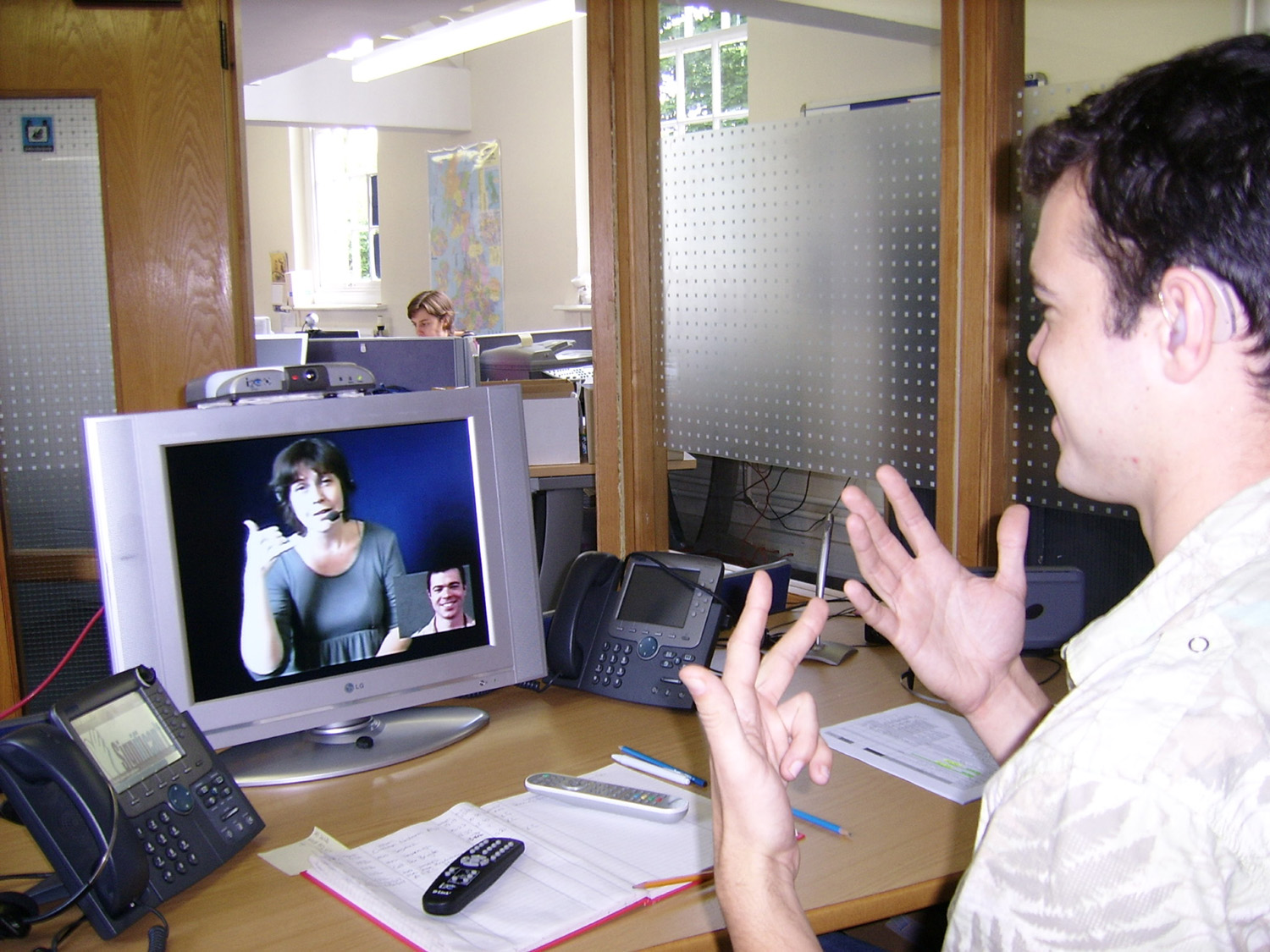
A deaf or hard-of-hearing person at his workplace using a VRS to communicate with a hearing person in London.

Using such video equipment, the deaf, hard-of-hearing, and speech-impaired can communicate between themselves and with hearing individuals using sign language. The United States and several other countries compensate companies to provide video relay service (VRS). Telecommunication equipment can be used to talk to others via a sign language interpreter, who uses a conventional telephone at the same time to communicate with the deaf person's party. Video equipment is also used to do on-site sign language translation via video remote interpreting (VRI). The relative low cost and widespread availability of 3G mobile phone technology with video calling capabilities have given deaf and speech-impaired users a greater ability to communicate with the same ease as others. Some wireless operators have even started free sign language gateways.

Sign language interpretation services via VRS or by VRI are useful in the present-day where one of the parties is deaf, hard-of-hearing, or speech-impaired (mute). In such cases the interpretation flow is normally within the same principal language, such as French Sign Language (LSF) to spoken French, Spanish Sign Language (LSE) to spoken Spanish, Swedish Sign Language (SSL) to spoken Swedish, German Sign Language (DGS) to spoken German, British Sign Language (BSL) to spoken English, and American Sign Language (ASL) also to spoken English (since BSL and ASL are completely distinct to each other), and so on.

Sign language interpreting involves considerable effort on the part of the interpreter, since sign languages are distinct natural languages with their own construction, semantics and syntax, different from the aural version of the same principal language.

Multilingual sign language interpreters, who can also translate as well across principal languages (such as from spoken Spanish, to spoken English, to ASL and vice versa), are also available, albeit less frequently.

With video interpreting, sign language interpreters work remotely with live video and audio feeds, so that the interpreter can see the signing party, and converse with the hearing–speaking party, and vice versa. Much like telephone interpreting, video interpreting can be used for situations in which no on-site interpreters are available. However, video interpreting cannot be used for situations in which all parties are speaking via telephone alone. VRS and VRI interpretation requires all parties to have the necessary equipment. Some advanced equipment enables interpreters to control the video camera remotely, in order to zoom in and out or to point the camera toward the party that is signing.

=== Interpreter working conditions ===
Unfavorable experiences of video relay interpreters have been documented in the United States and United Kingdom.

== VRS deployment worldwide ==
=== Video relay service platform vendors ===
Video Relay Services is based on three main factors: sign language interpreters, call center management (customer service, call center management), and platform provider (mobile app, servers).

=== Canada ===
Canada's regulatory Radio-television and Telecommunications Commission (CRTC) issued a policy order on July 21, 2009, requiring Canadian telecommunication, wireless service, and VoIP providers to implement IP-based text relay services by July 21, 2010, and also delaying a decision on the national provision of video relay services in both official languages (ASL & LSQ) for three years. According to deaf-community organizations Canada is lagging far behind its neighbour, the United States, with respect to video relay service for the deaf, hard-of-hearing, deaf-blind, and speech-impaired.

The Video Relay Service Trial Project, managed by Telus with Sorenson as the provider, ended on January 15, 2012. The trial project, which lasted for 18 months, was accessible for approximately 300 participants in BC and Alberta, and cost over $3 million (CAD).

The CRTC issued a policy order on April 22, 2014, deciding that VRS should be offered in Canada, starting as early as the fall of 2015, overseen and implemented by an independent VRS administrator (now the Canadian Administrator of Video Relay Service - CAV).

The CAV opened Video Relay Service in Canada - named SRV Canada VRS - for registration on September 28, 2016

At first, SRV Canada VRS offered 12 hour weekday service (6 am to 6 pm Pacific Time, and accordingly for subsequent time zones) and 8 hour weekend service (8 am to 4 pm Pacific Time). Hours of service were progressively increased, first on April 3, 2017 and then on July 3, 2017. On October 2, 24/7/365 service started.

=== Denmark ===
Denmark's video relay service is currently provided by TegnKom and 12K Studio (12K A/S).

TegnKom was created in 2005 as project in cooperation with AMC Nord (Aarhus Municipality), and only offered to deaf people at their workplace. The service can only be used on Windows-based units with use-license for the preinstalled software (MMX).

12K Studio was created and financed in 2011 by the nationwide sign language interpreter company, 12K A/S. The service can be used on Windows-, OS X/iOS-, Linux- and Android-based units (pc, mac and smartphones) with Skype and/or FaceTime app. 12K Studio service is primary offered to deaf people at their workplace, but can also be used in private for free.

=== France ===
There are five companies that provide VRS in France. On October 7, 2016, the Law for a Digital Republic (Loi pour une République numérique) required telephone services to be accessible to deaf, hard-of-hearing, deafblind and speech-impaired persons, through the provision of VRS for sign language and cued speech, Text-relay and Speech-relay. The law splits the requirement among three key sectors: telecom carriers, large corporations, and public services. These companies cover the cost of service, making it free for end-users. The major carriers under the French Telecom Federation (FFTélécoms) begin providing services in October 2018 through the Rogervoice app. Large corporations and public services do not comply uniformly to the requirement, and those that do only provide partial compliance, usually relying on one of the 5 existing third-party providers (Sourdline, Deafi, Elioz, Acceo and Rogervoice).

Legal compliance remains a challenge in France, with all parties being globally dissatisfied. In November 2021 a report mandated by the government and carried out by civil parties including NGOs and associations, drafts a list of proposals to improve services. With the focus being on end-users choosing which provider they'd like to make calls with (rather than carriers or call centers imposing a provider). The recommendations carry similar traits to the United States' TRS program. As of 2024 the reform is still underway and is expected to be enacted by 2025.

=== Germany ===
Currently, Germany has two providers of VRS and VRI: they are TeSS and TeleSign. TeSS was created in 2005 by the consortium of Deutsche Gesellschaft der Hörgeschädigten (German Society of Hearing Impaired), Deutsche Telekom, Bundesnetzagenteur (federal infrastructure regulatory agency), and several other associations. Deutsche Telekom provided the initial funding for feasibility project that started in 2006.

The deaf and hard-of-hearing clients who use the VRS for private calls must enrol with TeSS and arrange the payment method. They pay 14 eurocents per minute for text relay and 14 eurocents for video relay. TeSS operates around the clock (24/7).

TeleSign provides the combined video relay and video remote interpreting service for the deaf and hard-of-hearing clients at work. The clients must apply to the integration agency for videophones and funds. The subscription is 220 euros per month with one point seven euro per minute of video relay service. The integration agency restricts the monthly call volume to 100 minutes per client. TeleSign operates from eight in the morning to six in the afternoon.

TeSS has added the work-related VRS/VRI as to countereffect the demand of integration agency to switch from TeleSign to "cheaper" TeSS service.

Despite the availability of VRS providers in Germany since 2006, the VRS usage is very extremely low as compared to other countries (no more than 3000 clients out of 80,000 deaf people). The integration agency is notorious for rejecting the applications many times on "cost benefit" factor: the agency claims that some deaf clients do not make sufficient VRS calls per month to justify the cost or that the nature of employment does not warrant the need for VRS and videophones. The deaf and hard-of-hearing callers who use VRS for private calls do not receive any form of reimbursement for the VRS calls.

The grassroot movement is gaining momentum in pushing for the free VRS in Germany to be subsidised by the government through the contribution from the telecom companies.

=== Norway ===
NAV, or the Norwegian Labour and Welfare Administration provides the national relay service for Norway. The service started in 2008, and its usage is increasing.

=== Spain ===
Video relay service exists in Spain since September 2009. The platform that provides this service is called Svisual. It allows Deaf people and Hard of Hearing people to communicate with hearing people. The service is provided in Spanish Sign Language and in Catalan Sign Language. Customers may download a free video software application to their phone or tablet, or access the Svisual web on their computer. The service works 24 hours a day, every day of the year.

=== Sweden ===
Sweden was the first country in the world to implement a public VRS fully subsidized by the government. The service started as a pilot project in 1996 for ISDN videophones, but started to offer SIP-based services in 2003. Currently the Swedish video relay service is the largest in Europe with an average of 110,000 minutes every month.

There is one national service for the country, which is procured by bids to the National Telecom and Postal Agency (PTS) every four years.

The service is provided by Evantia Oy, with call centers in Örebro, Uppsala and Gotland.

Customers may download a video software application from the service provider, use a web-based application or access the service using Skype and third-party SIP software.

=== United Kingdom ===
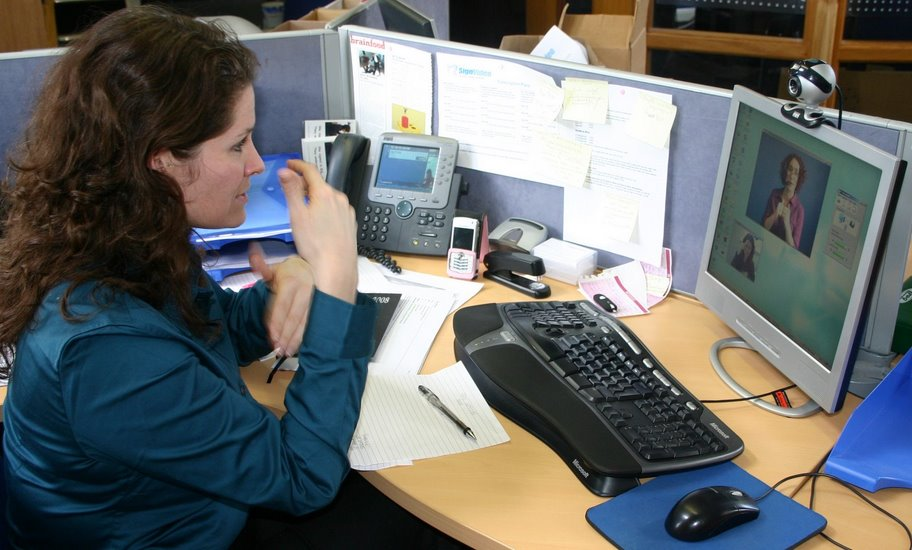
A person at her workplace communicating with a hearing person via a Video Interpreter (VI) and use of sign language.

Significan't (UK) Ltd, a deaf and sign language led social enterprise, was the first to establish an IP video relay service in 2004 in London. The SignVideo Contact Centre utilizes qualified and registered sign language interpreters and processed its 10,000th video call in 2006. In 2010 Significan't introduced the iSignVideo range of videophones and a web-based video calling service, the SignVideo SV2. This service is compliant with the concept of Total Conversation.

contactSCOTLAND BSL is the national VRS service for Scotland and it is free-of-charge for its users. The service was procured by the Scottish Government and it complies with standards for Total Conversation.

In 2015, the Association of Sign Language Interpreters in the UK published a Best Practice Document on Video Interpreting.

=== United States ===
In the United States, VRS services have been regulated by the U.S. Federal Communications Commission (FCC) since 2002.

==== Support for initial trials in Texas ====
Ed Bosson of the Texas Public Utility Commission (PUC) envisioned deaf people communicating with videophones more than 10 years before the FCC began reimbursing for it. Bosson contacted Mark Seeger of Sprint Relay and discussed the possibilities. Seeger then contacted Sprint technicians to see if the proposal was feasible, and then suggested that Bosson bring the idea to Texas' PUC.

It took Bosson considerable time to convince the Texas PUC and to enlist help from a lawyer in interpreting. He first convinced his supervisor and then, one-by-one, the PUC Commissioners that video relay should become a part of statewide Telecom Relay Service offering. Bosson was authorized to manage the first video relay service trials, and Sprint became the first service provider to conduct the Texas Video Relay Service tests. Bosson would later receive national awards from Smithsonian Computerworld and TDI for his work with VRS.

==== Initial Texas trials ====
In 1995, the first trial was run by Sprint in Austin and was limited to four public call centers.

The second trial occurred in 1997 and served ten cities in Texas. At that point, Sprint and Hanwave Interpreting partnered to provide service. Jon Hodson of Sorenson Communications worked with Ed Bosson during the early stages and provided video conferencing software during the VRS trial in Texas. (At this point the service was called "Video Relay Interpreting" or VRI, which a name that now refers to Video Remote Interpreting. Linda Nelson has been credited with changing the term from VRI to VRS.) Later, Hanwave Interpreting Service was bought by Communication Service for the Deaf, and Sprint expanded their relay subcontract to include VRS services in addition to the established TRS services.

==== Implementation across the United States ====
In 2000, VRS officially became available throughout the State of Texas. In 2002, the FCC allowed for the reimbursement of interstate VRS providers via an interstate TRS fund administration, making the United States the second country after Sweden to federally subsidize VRS nationwide.

==== United States VRS regulation ====
The Federal Communications Commission (FCC) is the regulatory body for VRS in the United States. In addition to overseeing VRS, the FCC also oversees Telecommunications Relay Services (TRS), from which the VRS regulatory framework has evolved. The FCC oversees TRS and VRS as a result of their mandate in the Americans With Disabilities Act (ADA) to facilitate the provisions equal access to individuals with disabilities over the telephone network.

The Interstate Telecommunications Relay Fund was created by the FCC to fund TRS and its scope was expanded to include VRS. Funding for the TRS comes from state tax, through rate adjustments or surcharge on local telephone bills. The tax on revenue is set by the FCC yearly and has been steadily increasing as the number of VRS minutes continues to climb. For 2007 the tax is 7.2/100ths of a penny per dollar of revenue, up from 3.8/100th of a penny in 2000. The current revenue tax of .0072 is expected to generate $553 million against telecommunications industry revenue of $76.8 billion. The fund is managed by an administrator who publishes the reimbursement rates paid to all relay providers.

In addition to regulating the funding of VRS, the FCC regulates the standards that VRS companies and their employees must follow in handling calls. These regulations ensure that VRS calls are handled appropriately and ethically.

The U.S. FCC-issued rulings include:

- The time it takes an interpreter to answer an incoming VRS call. As of July 1, 2006, VRS providers must answer 80% of calls within two and a half minutes. Starting on January 1, 2007, VRS providers must answer 80% of calls within two minutes;
- as of January 1, 2006, all VRS providers are required to provide service 24 hours a day, seven days a week;
- reimbursement of VRS Video Mail: if a Hearing person calls a sign language user, but there is no answer, the VI signs a message and delivers it to the sign language user's e-mail, similar to an answering machine. Previously this service was not reimbursed and the cost was absorbed by the VRS provider;
- VRS providers are not permitted to "call back" when a customer hangs up before a VRS call is placed;
- VRS providers must only process calls that either originate or terminate in the US or its territories. For example, a person in Canada may use a VRS service in the United States to call a person in the United States, but not another person in Canada.

==== 2005 U.S. FCC "Certification Program" ====
On December 12, 2005, the Commission released an order adopting new rules permitting carriers desiring to offer IP Relay and VRS services and receive payment from the Fund to seek certification as a provider eligible for compensation from the Fund. The record reflects that other entities that desire to offer VRS have been unable to join a certified state program.

(i) a description of the forms of TRS to be provided (i.e., VRS, IP Relay and/or IP CTS); (ii) a description of how the provider will meet all non-waived mandatory minimum standards applicable to each form of TRS offered; (iii) a description of the provider's procedures for ensuring compliance with all applicable TRS rules; (iv) a description of the provider's complaint procedures; (v) a narrative describing any areas in which the provider's service will differ from the applicable mandatory minimum standards; (vi) a narrative establishing that services that differ from the mandatory minimum standards do not violate applicable mandatory minimum standards; (vii) demonstration of status as a common carrier; and (viii) a statement that the provider will file annual compliance reports demonstrating continued compliance with these rules.

The rules further provide that after review of the submitted documentation, the Commission shall certify that the provider of IP Relay, VRS and IP CTS is eligible for compensation from the Fund if the Commission determines that the certification documentation:

(i) establishes that the provision of IP Relay, VRS and IP CTS ... will meet or exceed all non-waived operational, technical, and functional minimum standards contained in § 64.604; (ii) establishes that the IP Relay, VRS and IP CTS... provider makes available adequate procedures and remedies for ensuring compliance with the requirements of this section and the mandatory minimum standards contained in § 64.604, including that it makes available for its users informational materials on complaint procedures sufficient for users to know the proper procedures for filing complaints; and (iii) where its service differs from the mandatory minimum standards contained in § 64.604, the IP Relay, VRS and IP CTS ... provider establishes that its service does not violate applicable mandatory minimum standards.

==== Issues in United States VRS administration ====
- Numbering standardization competing VRS providers have incompatible numbering schemes.
- Interconnection between the IP-based videophone network and the worldwide telephone network.
- VRS providers encounter difficulties routing 911 calls to the appropriate Public Safety Answering Point (PSAP). When a VRS user dials 911, the call is first delivered to the VRS, as with any other call placed. However, when the VRS interpreter attempts to connect with the user's local PSAP, the call is instead connected to the PSAP that services the VRS provider's location. Additionally, the information displayed at the PSAP will be that of the VRS provider, not the VRS user.
  In order to route emergency calls and accurate information to the appropriate PSAP, VRS providers can send the call information to a national call-routing service. This service determines the appropriate local PSAP for the VRS user and delivers the VRS interpreter's 911 call accordingly. The VRS user can then communicate with the PSAP dispatcher via the VRS interpreter, in order to receive the appropriate emergency services. The European Union improves access to emergency services 112 for people with disabilities. The REACH112 project intends to implement a 12-month pilot in Sweden, UK, The Netherlands, France and Spain allowing disabled users to communicate at a distance with each other and directly with the emergency services.
- On November 19, 2009, the FBI unsealed indictments against 26 people charged with engaging in a scheme to steal millions of dollars from the Federal Communications Commission's (FCC) Video Relay Service (VRS) program. Arrests were made the same day by FBI agents and Postal Inspectors in New York, New Jersey, Florida, Texas, Pennsylvania, Arizona, Nevada, Oregon, and Maryland and were the result of a joint FBI, U.S. Postal Inspection Service (USPIS), and FCC Office of Inspector General (FCC-OIG) investigation into a nationwide scheme to defraud the FCC's VRS program.
  The indictments charged the owners, employees and contractors of several companies with engaging in a scheme to defraud the FCC's VRS program:
  - Viable Communications Inc., of Rockville, Maryland
  - Master Communications LLC, of Las Vegas
  - KL Communications LLC, of Phoenix
  - Mascom LLC of Austin, Texas
  - Deaf and Hard-of-Hearing Interpreting Services Inc. (DHIS), of New York and New Jersey
  - Innovative Communication Services for the Deaf
  - Tamara Frankel, Robert Rubeck, Benjamin Pena of Arizona
- There have been no further reports of VRS fraud, waste and abuse from the FCC Office of Inspector General since 2011.

== Technical details ==
=== Typical calling procedure in the United States ===
Normally:

1. An individual who communicates by American Sign Language, or other signed modality through a videophone or other video device, such as a webcam, to connect via broadband Internet to a Video Relay Service;
2. the caller is routed to a sign language interpreter, known as a Video Interpreter (VI). The VI is in front of a camera or videophone;
3. the video user gives the VI a voice number to dial, as well as any special dialing instructions;
4. the VI places the call and interprets as a neutral, non-participating third party. Anything that the audio user says is signed to the video user, and anything signed by the video user is spoken to the audio user;
5. once the call is over, the caller can make another call or hang up with the interpreter;
6. the company that provides the interpreter services will then submit billings to the FCC.

Hearing people can also contact a deaf, hard-of-hearing, or speech-disabled person via VRS. To initiate a call, a hearing person calls a VRS and connects to a video interpreter who then contacts the video user.

Some VRS services also offer:

- Voice Carry Over: The video user may use his/her own voice instead of the interpreter speaking;
- Hearing Carry Over: the video user may listen for him/herself instead of relying on the interpreter;
- Language Preference: The video user requests that the interpreter use American Sign Language;
- Trilingual services with a VI who can interpret into another spoken language, such as Spanish.

=== Videotelephony descriptive names & terminology ===
The name videophone is not as standardized as its earlier counterpart, the telephone, resulting in a variety of names and terms being used worldwide, and even within the same region or country. Videophones are also known as videotelephones (or video telephones) and often by an early trademarked name "Picturephone", which was the world's first commercial videophone produced in volume. The compound name "videophone" slowly entered into general use after 1950, although "video telephone" likely entered the lexicon earlier after "video" was coined in 1935. Videophone calls (also: videocalls and video chat), differ from videoconferencing in that they expect to serve individuals, not groups. However that distinction has become increasingly blurred with technology improvements such as increased bandwidth and sophisticated software clients that can allow for multiple parties on a call. In general everyday usage the term videoconferencing is now frequently used instead of videocall for point-to-point calls between two units. Both videophone calls and videoconferencing are also now commonly referred to as a video link.

Webcams are popular, relatively low cost devices which can provide live video and audio streams via personal computers, and can be used with many software clients for both video calls and videoconferencing.

A videoconference system is generally higher cost than a videophone and deploys greater capabilities. A videoconference (also known as a videoteleconference) allows two or more locations to communicate via live, simultaneous two-way video and audio transmissions. This is often accomplished by the use of a multipoint control unit (a centralized distribution and call management system) or by a similar non-centralized multipoint capability embedded in each videoconferencing unit. Again, technology improvements have circumvented traditional definitions by allowing multiple party videoconferencing via web-based applications. A separate webpage article is devoted to videoconferencing.

A telepresence system is a high-end videoconferencing system and service usually employed by enterprise-level corporate offices. Telepresence conference rooms use state-of-the art room designs, video cameras, displays, sound-systems and processors, coupled with high-to-very-high capacity bandwidth transmissions.

Typical use of the various technologies described above include calling or conferencing on a one-on-one, one-to-many or many-to-many basis for personal, business, educational, deaf video relay service and tele-medical, diagnostic and rehabilitative use or services. New services utilizing videocalling and videoconferencing, such as teachers and psychologists conducting online sessions, personal videocalls to inmates incarcerated in penitentiaries, and videoconferencing to resolve airline engineering issues at maintenance facilities, are being created or evolving on an ongoing basis.

== See also ==
- List of video telecommunication services and product brands
- Over the phone interpreting and telephone interpreting, audio-only language translation methods used by those with normal hearing.
- Telecommunications Relay Service, precursor to VRS.
- Telepresence, state-of-the-art videoconferencing technology.
- Videoconferencing
- Video Remote Interpreting (VRI), where the hearing person is co-located next to the signer.
- Videophone, VRS's original ancestor.
- Videotelephony
- Webcam
