= Telecommunications relay service =

Assistive operator service

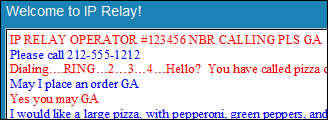
A typical relay service conversation

A telecommunications relay service (TRS; also a relay service, IP-relay, or web-based relay service) is an operator service that allows people who are deaf, hard of hearing, deafblind, or have a speech disorder to place calls to standard telephone users via a keyboard or assistive device. Originally, relay services were designed to be connected through a TDD, teletypewriter (TTY) or other assistive telephone device. Services gradually have expanded to include almost any real-time text capable technology such as a personal computer, laptop, mobile phone, PDA, and many other devices. The first TTY was invented by deaf scientist Robert Weitbrecht in 1964. The first relay service was established in 1974 by Converse Communications of Connecticut.

== Types of services available ==
Depending on the technical and physical abilities and physical environments of users, different call types are possible via relay services.

=== TTY to voice/voice to TTY ===
Once the most common type of TRS call, TTY calls involve a call from a deaf or hard-of-hearing person who utilizes a TTY to a hearing person. In this type of call, typed messages are relayed as voice messages by a TRS operator, (also known as Communication Assistant (CA), Relay Operator (RO), Relay Assistant (RA), or relay agent (agent)), and vice versa. This allows callers who are unable to use a regular telephone to be able to place calls to people who use a regular telephone and vice versa. When the person who is hearing is ready for a response, it is customary to say "go ahead" or "GA" to indicate that it is the TTY (teletypewriter) user's turn to talk and "stop keying", "SK", or "ready to hang up" when ending the call and vice versa. This mode of communication has largely been superseded by other modes of communications, including the utilization of IP relay, VPs, VRS, and VRI.

=== Voice carry over ===
A common type of call is voice carry over, VCO. This allows a person who is hard of hearing or deaf but can speak to use their voice while receiving responses from a person who is hearing via the operator's typed text. There are many variations of VCO, including two-line VCO and VCO with privacy.

==== VCO with privacy ====
The operator will not hear the VCO user's voiced messages and the VCO user does not need to voice GA. The operator will hear the person who is hearing, and the person who is hearing must give the GA each time to alert the operator it is the VCO user's turn. The VCO user does not need to voice GA, because the VCO user types it or presses the "VCO GA" button on the VCO phone when it's the voice user's turn to talk.

==== Two-line VCO ====
Two-line VCO allows a VCO user using a TTY or computer to call a TRS operator, who in turn calls the VCO user on a second telephone line, which serves as the voice line. The user puts the operator on a brief hold to initiate a three-way call with the hearing person. This method is frequently used by people who are hard of hearing and like to use some of their residual hearing as well as not having to say "go ahead". With two-line VCO, the VCO user and the voice user can interrupt each other. VCO with Privacy cannot be used with two-line VCO, because the operator, VCO user, and hearing person are on a three-way call.

=== Hearing carry over ===
A less common call type is hearing carry over (HCO). HCO allows a person who is speech-disabled but can hear to use their hearing while sending responses to a person who is hearing via the HCO user's typed text. The operator voices the HCO user's typed messages, and then the HCO users picks up the handset and listens to the other voice user's response. There are many variations of HCO, including two-line HCO and HCO with privacy.

==== HCO with privacy ====
The operator will not hear the voice user's voiced messages and the voice user does not need to voice GA. The operator will voice for the person who is Speech-Disabled, and the person who is Speech–Disabled must give the GA each time to alert the operator it is the voice user's turn. The voice user does not need to voice GA, because the HCO user can hear when the voice user finishes talking.

==== 2-line HCO ====
Similar to 2-line VCO, 2-line HCO allows an HCO user using a TTY or computer to call a TRS operator, who in turn calls the HCO user on a second telephone line, which serves as the voice line. The user puts the operator on a brief hold to initiate a three-way call with the hearing person. This method is frequently used by people who are Speech-Disabled and like to use some of their residual speech as well as not having to type "GA". With 2–Line HCO, the HCO user and the voice user can interrupt each other. HCO with Privacy cannot be used with 2–Line HCO, because the operator, HCO user, and hearing person are on a three–way call.

=== Speech to speech ===
Speech to speech (STS) exists for people who have speech disabilities. A specially–trained STS TRS operator revoices what the person with a speech disability says. STS is often used in combination with VCO for people who are deaf and have somewhat understandable speech, as well as two–Line HCO users. STS enables people with speech disabilities to call others (able-bodied speakers and other people with speech disabilities). It also enables people without speech disabilities to call people with speech disabilities. Anyone can call 711 in the U.S. and ask for Speech to Speech. STS is also available in Australia, New Zealand and Sweden.

Many STS users have Parkinson's disease, cerebral palsy, ALS, multiple sclerosis, muscular dystrophy or stroke. Other users stutter or have had a laryngectomy. STS also helps speech synthesizer users, users of Augmentative and Alternative Communication (AAC.) AAC users can set their device next to a speakerphone. They ask the STS CA set up the call, negotiate the menu, introduce the call explaining AAC and then go into the background. This enables AAC users to communicate independently once the other party is on the line.

=== Deafblind variation ===
Telebraille also exists for people who are deafblind with the use of a TTY with a braille or regular keyboard and a refreshable braille display or LVD (Large Visual Display). A relay call of a user who is deafblind is directly related to a relay call of a TTY user; however, the text transmission speed is often reduced to increase the ability of the user who is deafblind to comprehend the moving braille on the braille TTY or large print on the LVD. Telebraille relay operators must be familiar with Braille contractions that users who are deafblind may use. Due to its implementation of a smaller keyboard, some TTY users with mobile disabilities may prefer to use a Telebraille, regardless of a sight disability or lack thereof.

=== Captioned telephone ===
Captioned telephone is a hybrid communication method that enables people who are hard of hearing, oral deaf or late–deafened to speak directly to another party on a telephone call. Typically, a telephone that displays real-time captions of what the hearing party speaks during a conversation. The captions are displayed on a screen embedded in the telephone base. A captioned telephone can also function exactly like a VCO when the user switches the device to VCO mode to do things like communicate with an HCO user directly, without relay. Captioned telephone services can be provided in traditional telephone environments as well as in VOIP environments.

Captions are created by a communications assistant using a computer with voice recognition software. The communications assistant listens to and revoices the hearing party's side of the conversation into the microphone of a headset. A voice recognition program creates the captions and they are sent out to the captioned telephone where they are read by the user.

==== IP CTS ====
Internet Protocol Captioned Telephone Service (IP CTS), like other forms of CTS, allows users with some residual hearing, who can speak, to simultaneously listen to the other party and read captions of what the other party in a telephone conversation is saying. IP CTS uses the Internet – rather than the telephone network – to provide the link and captions between the CTS user and the CTS service provider.

Prior to 2005, captioned telephone service was only available to people in states that had captioned telephone service as part of their state relay program. In 2005, the FCC made IP CTS a part of the federally mandated services.

IP CTS Requires an internet connection to deliver the captions to the user. Most also rely on their regular land-line telephone for the audio portion of the call, but some configurations of IP CTS allow the use of VOIP to carry the call audio. IP CTS has allowed captioned telephone service to be provided on smartphones and tablets.

==== Two–line captioned telephone ====
Captioned telephone can also be used with two lines. This is especially useful for users who prefer to give out their home phone number alone, instead of both the captioning service number and the toll-free captioning service number or for users who prefer to turn captions on and off anytime during the call. 2–Line captioned telephone can also be used with other relay services. For example, STS can be used with a 2–Line captioned telephone, for captioned telephone users with speech disabilities. 2–Line captioned telephone is only available to people in states that have 2–Line captioned telephone as part of their relay service or federal employees/contractors and American Indians.

==== Web-based captioned telephone ====
Web-based captioned telephone enables telephone calls to be placed with captions, by utilizing the World Wide Web browser window of a computer or smart phone. It is similar to a traditional captioned phone call except the user's own telephone equipment is used, whilst the captions are viewed online instead of in the captioned telephone display screen.

=== Other variations ===
Many other call type variations are possible, including VCO to VCO, HCO to HCO, HCO to TTY, and VCO to TTY. Fundamentally, relay services have the ability to connect any two callers with different abilities over the telephone network. Voice callers in the United States can now access the service with a universal number: 711. After the number is dialled, the caller will receive instructions to complete the call to reach deaf callers.

=== IP/web-based relay services ===
IP relay services, called Web-based text relay services in Europe, provide functionality similar to TDD/TTY relay services. Instead of using telephone lines and TDD/TTY devices, they use an Internet connection and software running on computers or smartphones.

When using an IP relay service for an emergency call like 911 or 112, the relay operator will ask for the street address, city, and state from which the call is originating. If this information is not provided, the relay operator will be unable to complete the emergency call.

Most IP relay services support Web browsers, mobile phone apps, text messaging, WAP, instant messaging, and Text over IP (ToIP). Support for these technologies has enabled many Internet-connected devices to be used with relay services, including desktop and laptop personal computers, mobile phones, and PDAs.

=== Video relay service ===
Video relay service (VRS) allows people who use sign language to place phone calls by signing instead of typing. The VI (video interpreter) uses a webcam or videophone to voice the deaf, hard-of-hearing or, speech-disabled person's signs to a hearing person and sign the hearing person's words to the deaf, hard-of-hearing or speech-impaired person.

=== Video remote interpreting ===
Video Remote Interpreting (VRI) allows deaf or hard-of-hearing people who use sign language to communicate with hearing people in the same room. VRI addresses one limitation to VRS, which is that VRS cannot be used if the hearing person is in the same room with the deaf or hard-of-hearing person. VRI has proven to be useful for deaf or hard-of-hearing people in business meetings, doctor appointments, minor surgical procedures, and court proceedings.

== Accessibility ==
In Canada and the United States, the telephone number 711 is used for the Telecommunications Relay Service.

In the U.S., every phone company is required to connect persons who dial 711 to a TRS call center from a working number. In July 2007, the Federal Communications Commission ruled that the 711 requirement extended to VOIP telephony.

Anyone can use 711; it is not limited to those who are deaf, hard of hearing, or speech impaired. As such, it has been used by those without hearing or speech disabilities to make long-distance calls free of charge with TRS providers who do not bill for them. Providers defend this as a necessary evil to maintain "transparency", which is the belief that the operator and the mechanics of relay should generally go as unnoticed as possible in the call. This requires that TRS be as easy to use as normal telephones, which do not require their users to verify anything. Leaders in the deaf community defend this decision and generally retain strong support among service users with hearing and speech disabilities.

== Fraudulent uses in the United States ==
The open structure of relay services has led to a number of complaints regarding its use as a vehicle for fraud. In 2004, news outlets, such as MSNBC, and several newspapers, including the Baltimore City Paper, ran stories of reported abuse of the relay system, such as users from international locations calling businesses in the United States to fraudulently purchase goods. This has also generated numerous complaints, particularly by those who were employed as relay operators, that so-called "prank calls," where neither user requires the service and the caller is just attempting to have fun with a novel mode of communication. In December 2006, NBC ran another story where former operators alleged that "85 to 90 percent" of calls were scams. Since it is illegal for relay service companies to keep records, fraudulent users can operate with impunity. Fraudulent calls of both types have been cited as reasons for further relay regulation, and as causes for long hold times that must be endured by many legitimate users. Most businesses legally cannot have relay calls blocked due to the need for legitimate users to be accommodated, although businesses that are repeatedly victimized by pranks and/or scams often stop trusting relay calls or hang up on them because it is difficult to distinguish legitimate users from illegitimate ones; this is another way that the abusers of the service ultimately victimize the legitimate users, in addition to tying up the service from them.

In 2006, the FCC launched a campaign to gather feedback from the various Internet Protocol relay-certified companies operating within the United States to fight the wave of relay scams and pranks being made over the service. As brought up in the FCC's released document, users on the IP-based relay services can thus place their calls anonymously, which cannot certify that the user in question really needs operator assistance or not. Furthermore, fraudulent calls of any nature cost millions to the American people yearly (based on the $1.293 per minute fee that is being paid for completed IP-based relay) to various relay providers for successfully completed calls.

Starting in November 2009, to help counter the problem of fraudulent use, the FCC began requiring all users of IP Relay to register their screen names with a default IP Relay provider. This, along with many IP Relay providers working to educate hearing users of the risks of fraudulent users (making it less lucrative for fraudulent users who no longer have an uneducated population to target), and other efforts has greatly reduced the amount of fraudulent use of the IP Relay system.

In March 2012, the United States federal government announced a lawsuit against AT&T. The specific accusations state that AT&T "violated the False Claims Act by facilitating and seeking federal payment for IP Relay calls by international callers who were ineligible for the service and sought to use it for fraudulent purposes. The complaint alleges that, out of fears that fraudulent call volume would drop after the registration deadline, AT&T knowingly adopted a non-compliant registration system that did not verify whether the user was located within the United States. The complaint further contends that AT&T continued to employ this system even with the knowledge that it facilitated use of IP Relay by fraudulent foreign callers, which accounted for up to 95 percent of AT&T’s call volume. The government’s complaint alleges that AT&T improperly billed the TRS Fund for reimbursement of these calls and received millions of dollars in federal payments as a result."

== See also ==
- Communication assistance in Israel
- Relay (disambiguation)
- Relay (film)
- Telecommunications device for the deaf
- Text-to-911
