= Shakey the robot =

General-purpose mobile robot

Shakey the mobile robot
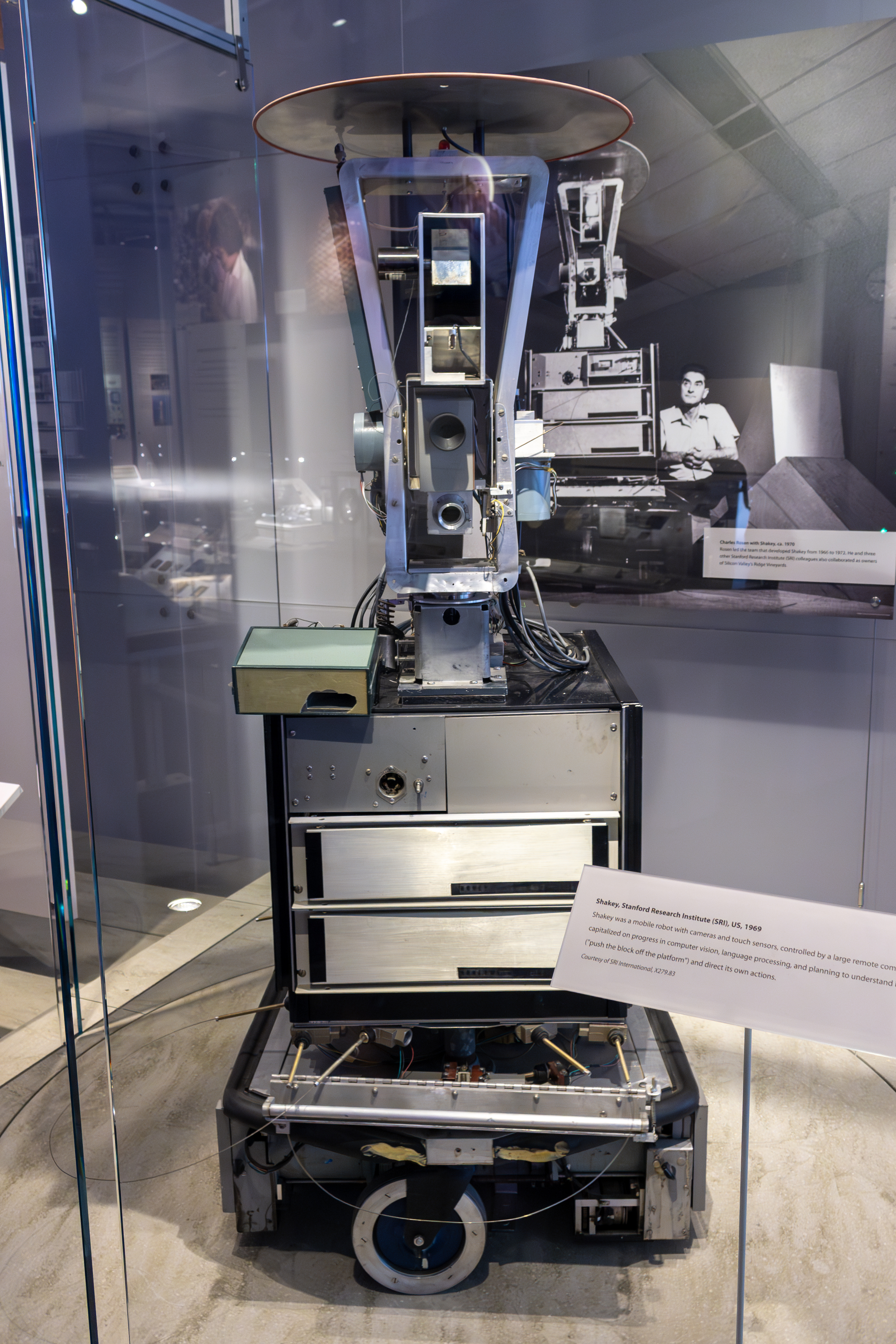
- Shakey the Robot in its display case at the Computer History Museum
- Manufacturer: SRI International
- Year of creation: 1966
- Replaced by: Flakey the robot

Shakey the Robot was the first general-purpose mobile robot able to reason about its own actions. While other robots would have to be instructed on each individual step of completing a larger task, Shakey could analyze commands and break them down into basic chunks by itself.

Due to its nature, the project combined research in robotics, computer vision, and natural language processing. Because of this, it was the first project that melded logical reasoning and physical action. Shakey was developed at the Artificial Intelligence Center of Stanford Research Institute (now called SRI International).

Some of the most notable results of the project include the A* search algorithm, the Hough transform, and the visibility graph method.

== History ==
Shakey was developed from approximately 1966 through 1972 with Charles Rosen, Nils Nilsson and Peter Hart as project managers. Other major contributors included Alfred Brain, Sven Wahlstrom, Bertram Raphael, Richard Duda, Richard Fikes, Thomas Garvey, Helen Chan Wolf and Michael Wilber. The project was funded by the Defense Advanced Research Projects Agency (DARPA) based on a SRI proposal submitted in April 1964 for research in "Intelligent Automata", later "Intelligent Automata to Reconnaissance".

It was originally designed to have two retractable arms.

Now retired from active duty, Shakey is currently on view in a glass display case at the Computer History Museum in Mountain View, California. The project inspired numerous other robotics projects, most notably the Centibots.

== Software ==
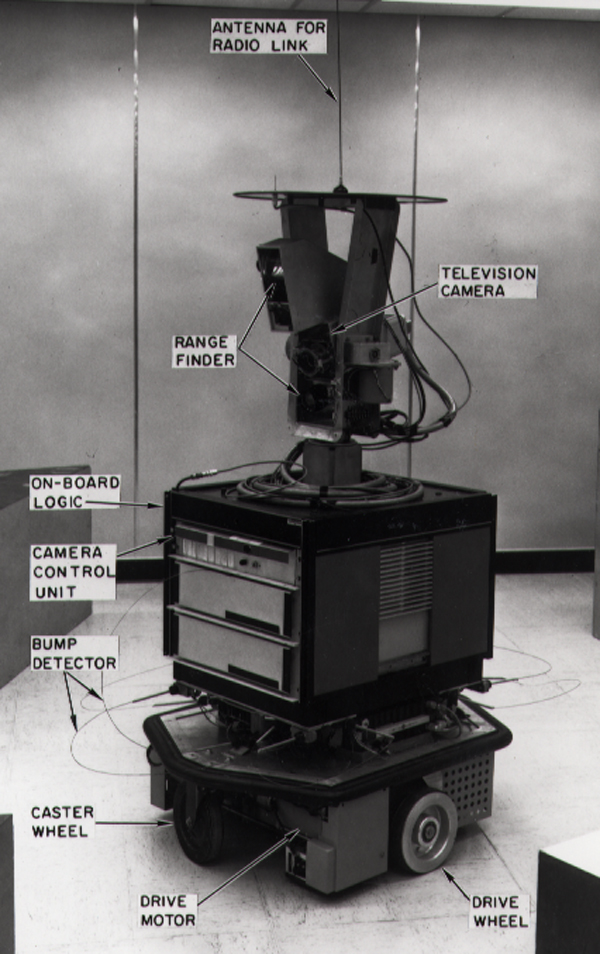
Shakey in 1972

The robot's programming was primarily done in LISP. The Stanford Research Institute Problem Solver (STRIPS) planner it used was conceived as the main planning component for the software it utilized. As the first robot that was a logical, goal-based agent, Shakey experienced a limited world. A version of Shakey's world could contain a number of rooms connected by corridors, with doors and light switches available for the robot to interact with.

Shakey had a short list of available actions within its planner. These actions involved traveling from one location to another, turning the light switches on and off, opening and closing the doors, climbing up and down from rigid objects, and pushing movable objects around. The STRIPS automated planner could devise a plan to enact all the available actions, even though Shakey himself did not have the capability to execute all the actions within the plan personally.

An example mission for Shakey might be something like, an operator types the command "push the block off the platform" at a computer console. Shakey looks around, identifies a platform with a block on it, and locates a ramp in order to reach the platform. Shakey then pushes the ramp over to the platform, rolls up the ramp onto the platform, and pushes the block off the platform.

== Hardware ==
Physically, the robot was particularly tall, and had an antenna for a radio link, sonar range finders, a television camera, on-board processors, and collision detection sensors ("bump detectors"). The robot's tall stature and tendency to shake resulted in its name:

We worked for a month trying to find a good name for it, ranging from Greek names to whatnot, and then one of us said, 'Hey, it shakes like hell and moves around, let’s just call it Shakey.'

— Charles Rosen

== Research results ==
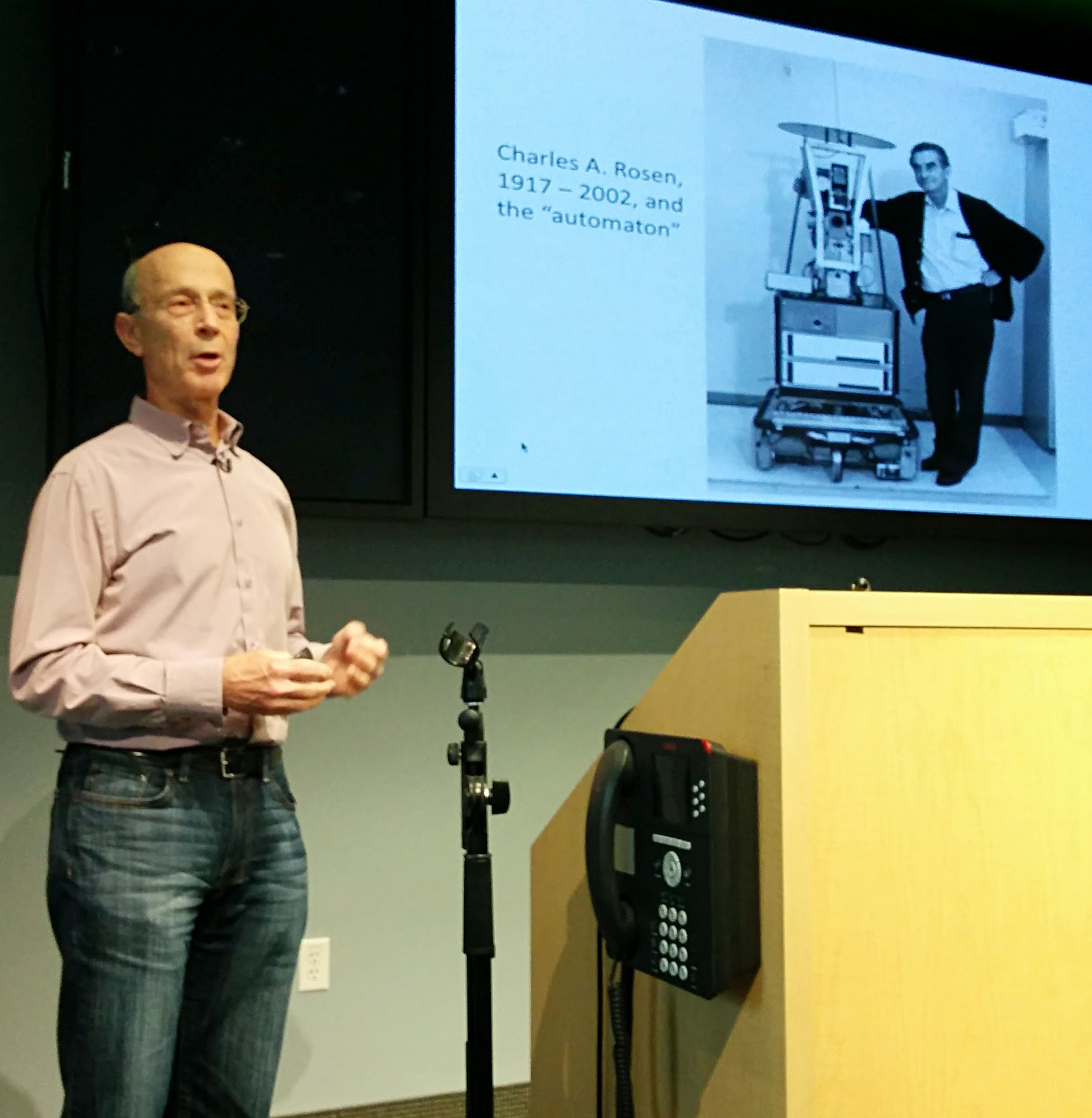
Peter Hart discussed Shakey's firsts in a talk at Google in February 2015.

The development of Shakey provided far-reaching impact on the fields of robotics and artificial intelligence, as well as computer science in general. Some of the more notable results include the development of the A* search algorithm, which is widely used in pathfinding and graph traversal, the process of plotting an efficiently traversable path between points; the Hough transform, which is a feature extraction technique used in image analysis, computer vision, and digital image processing; and the visibility graph method for finding Euclidean shortest paths among obstacles in the plane.

== Media and awards ==
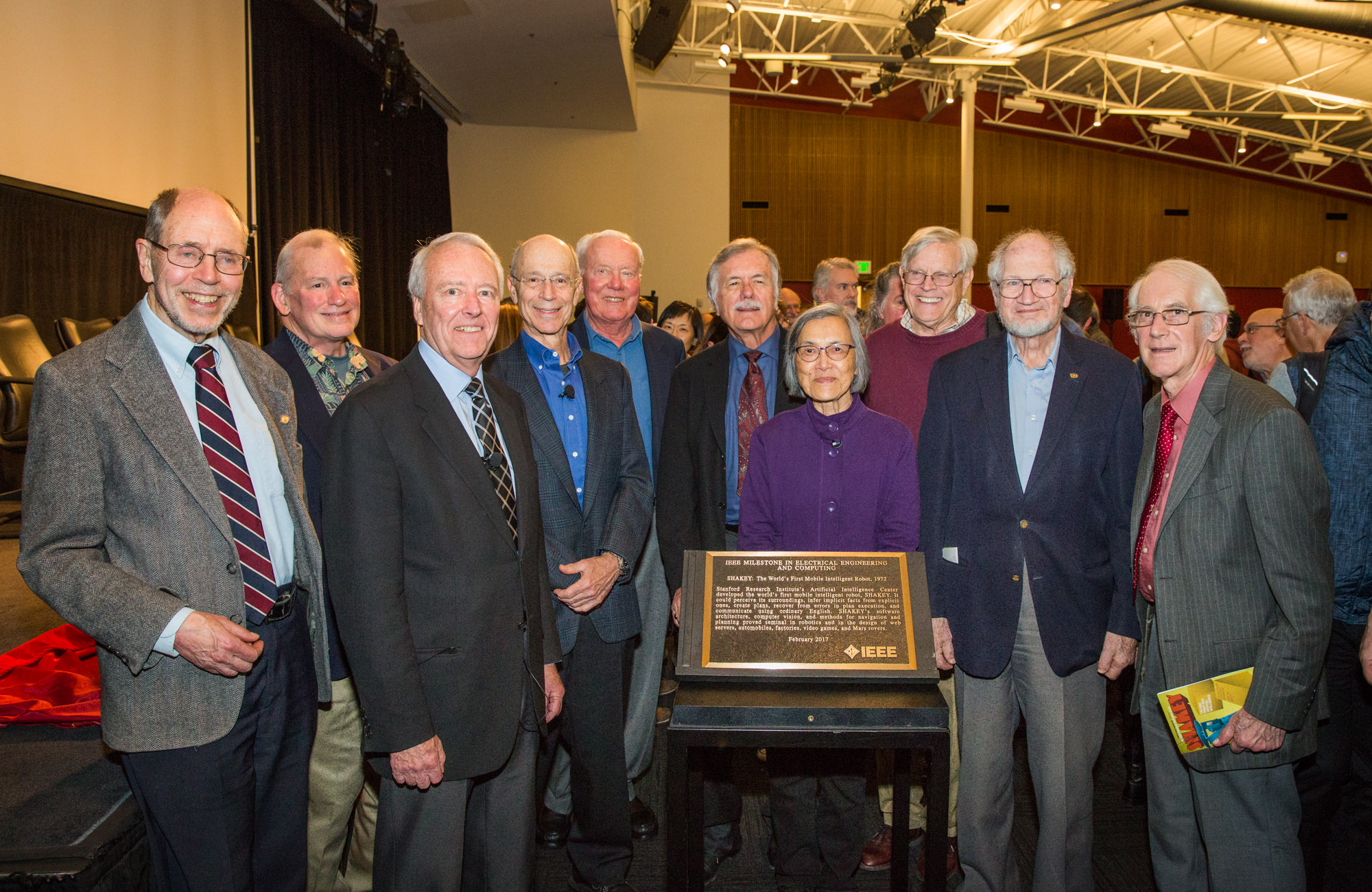
Shakey's creators at the IEEE Milestone award event at the Computer History Museum, February 2017: (from left) Richard O. Duda, Tom Garvey, IEEE President Elect Jim Jeffries, Peter E. Hart, Nils J. Nilsson, Richard Fikes, Helen Chan Wolff, Claude Fennema, Bertram Raphael, Mike Wilber.

In 1969 the SRI published "SHAKEY: Experimentation in Robot Learning and Planning", a 24-minute video. The project then received media attention. This included an article in the New York Times on April 10, 1969. In 1970, Life referred to Shakey as the "first electronic person"; and in November 1970 National Geographic Magazine covered Shakey and the future of computers. The Association for the Advancement of Artificial Intelligence's AI Video Competition's awards are named "Shakeys" because of the significant impact of the 1969 video.

Shakey was inducted into Carnegie Mellon University's Robot Hall of Fame in 2004 alongside such notables as ASIMO and C-3PO.

Shakey has been honored with an IEEE Milestone in Electrical Engineering and Computing.

Shakey was showcased in the BBC's Towards Tomorrow: Robot (1967) documentary.
