= Centibots =

Robots created around 2003

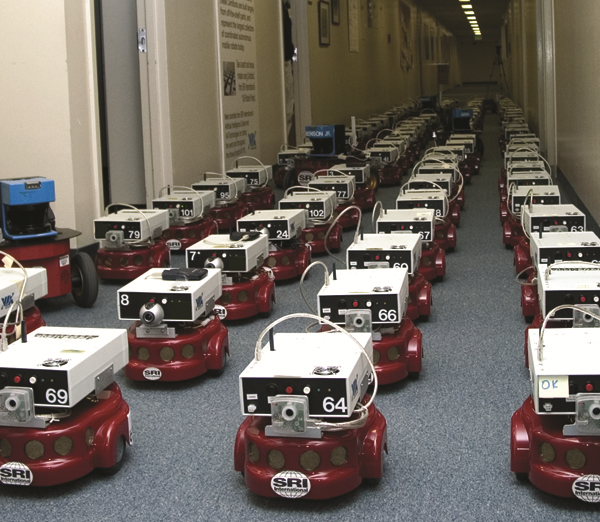
- Centibots in 2003
- Manufacturer: SRI International
- Year of creation: 2003
- Derived from: ActivMedia Robotics Amigobots
- Website: www.ai.sri.com/centibots/

Centirobots, or simply centibots, were robots created around 2003 and designed to coordinate in large numbers in order to achieve a single goal, an early example of swarm robotics. The $2.2 million project was sponsored by DARPA and had principal investigator SRI International along with other investigators University of Washington's Robotics and State Estimation Lab, Stanford University and ActivMedia Robotics. SRI's Artificial Intelligence Center was known for previous work in robotics, in particular Shakey the robot and related research.

There were a total of 100 robots, 80 of which were ActivMedia Robotics Amigobots and the remaining 20 were ActivMedia Pioneer 2 AT bots. The robots were used to map out an area or locate an object of interest.
