= Dana H. Ballard =

American computer scientist (1946–2022)

Dana Harry Ballard
- Born: 1946
- Died: 2022 (aged 75–76)
- Education: Massachusetts Institute of Technology (BS), University of Michigan (MS), University of California, Irvine (PhD)
- Known for: Contributions to computer vision, generalized Hough Transform, predictive coding in visual cortex
- Notable work: Computer Vision (with Christopher M. Brown), An Introduction to Natural Computation, Brain Computation as Hierarchical Abstraction
- Scientific career
- Fields: Computer science, Artificial intelligence, Cognitive science
- Institutions: University of Texas at Austin, University of Rochester

Dana Harry Ballard (October 15, 1946– November 3, 2022) was a professor of computer science at the University of Texas at Austin and formerly with the University of Rochester.

Ballard attended MIT and graduated in 1967 with his bachelor's degree in aeronautics and astronautics. He then attended the University of Michigan for his masters in information and control engineering in 1970. He received his Ph.D. from the University of California, Irvine in information engineering in 1974. He did research in artificial intelligence and human cognition and perception with a focus on the human visual system. In 1982, with Christopher M. Brown he authored a pioneering textbook in the field of computer vision, titled Computer Vision. He also popularized the use of the generalised hough transform in computer vision in his paper "Generalizing the Hough Transform to Detect Arbitrary Shapes." He is also known as a proponent of active vision techniques for computer vision systems as well as approaches to understanding human vision.

Written with Rajesh Rao, his paper "Predictive coding in the visual cortex: a functional interpretation of some extra-classical receptive-field effects" helped spark the rise of predictive coding as an influential framework for thinking about the brain and vision.

Ballard's textbook titled "An Introduction to Natural Computation" (1997) combines introductory material on varied subjects relevant to computing in the brain, such as neural networks, reinforcement learning, and genetic learning. His last book, "Brain Computation as Hierarchical Abstraction," describes a multilevel approach to understanding neural computation.
