= Peter E. Hart =

American computer scientist and entrepreneur (born 1941)

- Peter Hart
- Born: 1941 (age 84–85); Brooklyn, New York, US
- Education: Rensselaer Polytechnic Institute; Stanford University
- Known for: A* search algorithm K-NN
- Scientific career
- Fields: Artificial intelligence
- Workplaces: SRI International AI Center; Ricoh Innovations
- Doctoral advisor: Thomas M. Cover
- Website: www.peterhart.net

Peter Elliot Hart (born 1941) is an American computer scientist and entrepreneur. He was chairman and president of Ricoh Innovations, which he founded in 1997. He made significant contributions in the field of computer science in a series of widely cited publications from the years 1967 to 1975 while associated with the Artificial Intelligence Center of SRI International, a laboratory where he also served as director.

== Education ==
Hart was born in Brooklyn, New York. He studied at Rensselaer Polytechnic Institute, leading to a BEE degree in 1962. He did his graduate studies at Stanford University, where he got his MS in 1963 and PhD in 1966, both in electrical engineering. Thomas M. Cover was his advisor and the two coauthored a 1967 paper on the nearest neighbor decision rule and the admissibility of the single NN rule.

== Career ==
While at the SRI International Artificial Intelligence Center, Hart co-authored 20 papers, among them the initial exposition of the A* search algorithm and the variant of the Hough transform now widely used in computer vision for finding straight line segments in images. He also contributed to the development of Shakey the Robot.

Hart and Richard O. Duda are the authors of "Pattern Classification and Scene Analysis", originally published in 1973. This classic text is a widely cited reference, and the first edition was in print for over 25 years until being superseded by the second edition in 2000.

In 1980 Hart left SRI to set up a new AI laboratory within Fairchild, a Schlumberger subsidiary in Palo Alto.

== Memberships and awards ==
Hart is an IEEE Fellow, an ACM Fellow and an AAAI Fellow. In 1998, Hart and Thomas M. Cover received the IEEE Information Society Golden Jubilee Award for establishing error bounds on the nearest-neighbor rule for pattern classification.

== Personal life ==
Hart is married to Diane Hart, an education writer and a birding enthusiast.
