= Flakey the robot =

Research robot

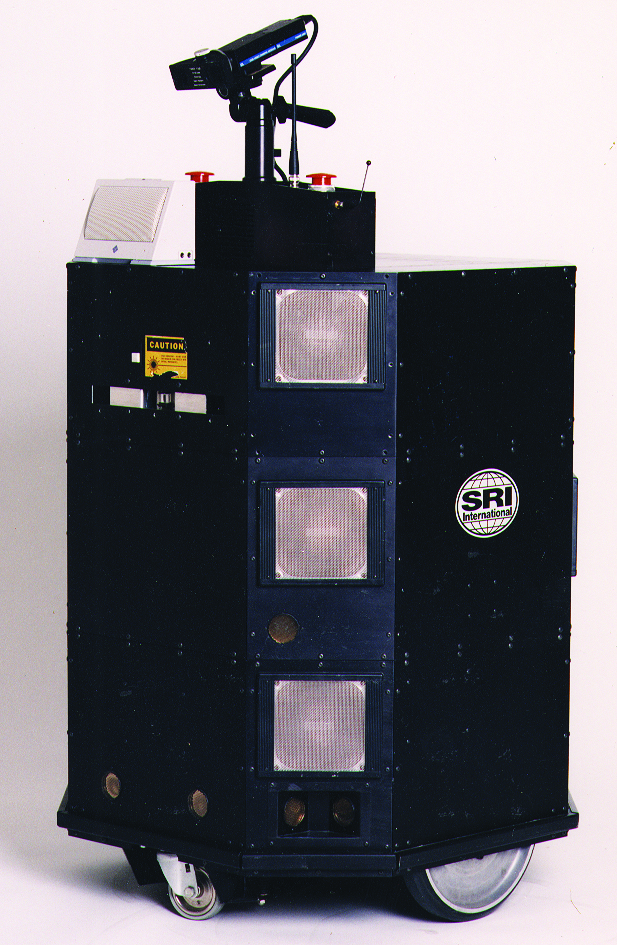
- Manufacturer: SRI International
- Year of creation: 1985
- Derived from: Shakey the robot

Flakey the robot was a research robot created at SRI International's Artificial Intelligence Center and was the successor to Shakey the robot. It is featured in a Scientific American Frontiers episode (Season 5, Episode 1).

== Software ==
Most of Flakey's routines were written in Lisp, with some lower-level code written in C. The code maintains a "Local Perceptual Space" that is updated by the sensors and acted on by planning algorithms.

== Hardware ==
It was about 3 feet tall and 2 feet wide, and included 12 sonar sensors, optical wheel encoders, a video camera, and a depth-finding laser.

== Research results ==
Flakey was used to demonstrate fuzzy logic and goal-oriented behavior - it would take what it knew and work towards one of several goals. At the first AAAI robotics competition in July 1992, Flakey took second place and the University of Michigan's CARMEL took first, above Georgia Tech's "Buzz" and IBM's "TJ2".
