= Helen Chan Wolf =

Artificial intelligence pioneer

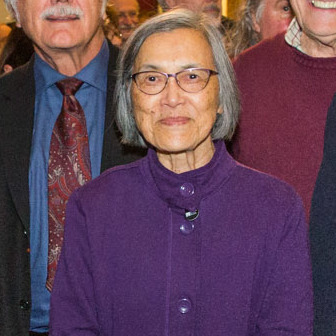
- Scientific career
- Workplaces: SRI International; Panoramic Research

Helen Chan Wolf is an artificial intelligence pioneer who worked on facial recognition technology and Shakey the robot, the world's first autonomous robot, at SRI International.

== Career ==
In the early 1960s, Wolf worked with Charles Bisson and Woody Bledsoe at Panoramic Research to train computers in recognising human faces (so-called automated facial recognition). Early computer programs used humans to coordinate a set of features from images of faces and then a computer for the recognition. These features included things such as the positions the inside and outside corners of eyes and mouth. Operators such as these could process around forty pictures an hour.

Wolf joined the Artificial Intelligence group at SRI International (then Stanford Research Institute) in 1966. At the SRI Chan was part of the Application of Intelligent Automata to Reconnaissance project. Here she worked on Shakey the robot, the world's first mobile autonomous robot, which was honoured by an Institute of Electrical and Electronics Engineers Milestone in 2017. Shakey used artificial intelligence, making its own plans, navigating between places and improving through learning. Wolf developed the algorithms that extracted coordinates from images. Before Shakey, there were no efforts to integrate artificial intelligence and robotics into a single moving vehicle.

=== Selected publications ===
Her publications include:

- Wolf, Helen C. (1977). "Experiments in Map-Guided Photo Interpretation" (PDF). Proceedings of the Fifth IJCAI. Cambridge, Mass. p. 696.
- Wolf, Helen C. (1977). "Parametric Correspondence and Chamfer Matching: Two New Techniques for Image Matching". Technical Note. Archived from the original on December 30, 2019.
- Wolf, Helen C. (Feb 1994). "Locating perceptually salient points on planar curves". IEEE Transactions on Pattern Analysis and Machine Intelligence. 16 (2): 113–129. doi:10.1109/34.273737.
- Wolf, Helen C. (1987). "Linear Delineation". Readings in Computer Vision: 204–209. doi:10.1016/B978-0-08-051581-6.50025-8. ISBN 9780080515816.
