= Richard O. Duda =

American electrical engineer

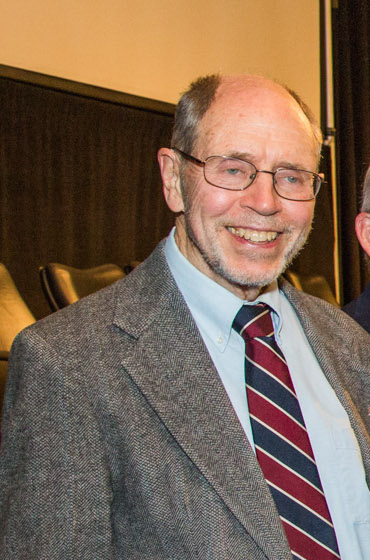
- Born: April 27, 1936; Evanston, IL
- Died: October 20, 2026 (aged 90); Menlo Park, CA
- Citizenship: United States
- Education: University of California, Los Angeles; Massachusetts Institute of Technology
- Known for: Pattern classification and scene analysis Expert systems Hough transform
- Awards: IEEE Fellow; AAAI Fellow
- Scientific career
- Fields: Electrical Engineering
- Workplaces: University of California, Davis; San Jose State University; Syntelligence; Fairchild Semiconductor; University of Texas, Austin; SRI International

Richard O. Duda was Professor Emeritus of Electrical Engineering at San Jose State University renowned for his work on sound localization and pattern recognition. He lived in Menlo Park, California.

== Education ==
Duda received B.S. and M.S. degrees in Engineering from the University of California, Los Angeles in 1958 and 1959, and the PhD in Electrical Engineering from Massachusetts Institute of Technology in 1962.

== Career ==
While at SRI International, Duda and Peter E. Hart were the authors of "Pattern Classification and Scene Analysis", originally published in 1973. This classic text is a widely cited reference, and the first edition was in print for over 25 years until being superseded by the second edition in 2000.

Duda was an IEEE Fellow and a AAAI Fellow.

== See also ==
- Expert systems
- Pattern recognition
- Hough transform
