= List of social bookmarking websites =

A social bookmarking website is a centralized online service that allows users to store and share Internet bookmarks. Such a website typically offers a blend of social and organizational tools, such as annotation, categorization, folksonomy-based tagging, social cataloging and commenting. The website may also interface with other kinds of services, such as citation management software and social networking sites.

Name	Description
BibSonomy	A system for sharing bookmarks and lists of literature.
Digg	A news aggregator with an editorially driven front page.
Diigo	Designed to bookmark web pages and highlight key points for reference. Has both a free version and a premium version.
Flipboard	A content aggregator website that allows users to share, group, and collect content from multiple sources.
Hatena	Hatena Bookmark is a social bookmarking service by a Japanese company. It is often colloquially referred to as Hatebu.
Pearltrees	Collaborative bookmark exploration and curation tool organized and presented like a mind map.
Pinterest	A web and mobile application that offers visual discovery, collection, sharing, and storage of images.
Pinboard	Pinboard has a plain design and a focus on personal management of bookmarks using tags to organize them, similar to early versions of the Delicious social bookmarking service
Plurk	A free social networking and micro-blogging service that allows users to send updates (known as plurks) through short messages or links, which can be up to 360 text characters in length (previously 140).
Reddit	Users submit content in the form of either a link or a text ("self") post. Links and content can be voted on.
Scoop.it	A content curation website that lets businesses and professionals to research and publish content.
SiteBar	A free online bookmarking manager. It is open source software, mainly funded by authors' donations.
We Heart It	An image-based social network for inspiring images.

== Defunct sites ==
Name	Description
BookmarkSync
CiteULike	A web service that allowed users to save and share citations to academic papers.
Clipmarks	A Delicious-like social bookmarking service, bought by Clipboard in 2012.
Connotea	Discontinued service on March 12, 2013.
Delicious	The site was bought by Avos Systems on April 27, 2011, though was operated by Yahoo! until July 2011. On June 1, 2017, Delicious was acquired by Pinboard, and the service will be discontinued. As of March 2018, the website is read-only.
Faves	As of January 2012, the service is no longer active.
Furl	Web page clipping and archiving service, founded in 2003 and acquired by Diigo in 2009.
Gnolia	Formerly Ma.gnolia
My Web	Launched by Yahoo! in 2005, superseded by Yahoo! Bookmarks.
Newsvine	Owned by NBC, community-powered, hosted content from its users and syndicated content. Discontinued on October 1, 2017, redirects to NBC News.
oneview
Pocket	Established in 2007, for storing, sharing, and discovering web bookmarks.
Simpy	Formerly de.lirio.us
StumbleUpon	StumbleUpon was a discovery engine that finds and recommends web content to its users. It has moved to Mix.
Trackle	Trackle offered a variety of information categories that users could keep tabs on and share like-interests with groups of users via Twitter, SMS, and email.
Twine	Twine existed from 2007 to 2010.
Xmarks	Syncs bookmarks (folders & sub-folders) and profiles across different browsers and platforms. Includes sharing option and possibility to access bookmarks via web-based interface. On May 1, 2018, Xmarks was discontinued after being acquired by LastPass.

== See also ==
- Comparison of enterprise bookmarking platforms
- List of social software
- List of social networking services
- Comparison of reference management software
- Social network aggregation
