= Technorati =

Search engine and a publisher advertising platform

- Website type: Search Engine & publisher advertising platform
- Available in: English
- Owner: Synacor
- Launched: November 2002
- Current status: active

Technorati is a search engine and a publisher advertising platform. Technorati launched its ad network in 2008. In 2016, Synacor acquired Technorati for $3 million.

The company's core product was previously an Internet search engine for searching blogs. The website stopped indexing blogs and assigning authority scores in 2014 with the launch of its new website, which is focused on online publishing and advertising. Technorati was founded by Dave Sifry, with its headquarters in San Francisco. Kevin Marks was the site's Principal Engineer. Tantek Çelik was the site's Chief Technologist.

== History ==
In 2006, Debi Jones pointed out that Technorati's "State of the Blogosphere" postings, which then claimed to track 27.7 million blogs, did not take into account MySpace blogs, of which she said that there were 56 million. As a result, she said that the utility of Technorati as a gauge of blog popularity was questionable. However, Aaron Brazell pointed out that Technorati had started tracking MySpace blogs. That same year, Technorati teamed up with the public relations agency Edelman. The deal earned a lot of criticism, both on principle and as a result of Edelman's 2006 fake blog scandals. Edelman and Technorati officially ended the deal later in 2006.

The website won the SXSW 2006 awards for Best Technical Achievement and Best of Show. It was nominated for a 2006 Webby Award for Best Practices, but lost to Flickr and Google Maps.

In 2007, Andrew Orlowski, writing for the tech tabloid The Register, criticized Technorati's redesign. He suggested that Technorati had decided to focus more on returning image thumbnails rather than blog results. He also claimed that Technorati never quite worked correctly in the past and that the alleged refocus was "a tacit admission that it's given up on its original mission".

In 2008, Technorati acquired the online magazine, Blogcritics, for an undisclosed sum of money. As a result, Blogcritic's founders – publisher Eric Olsen and technical director Phillip Winn – became full-time Technorati employees. One of the first collaborative ventures of the two entities was for Blogcritics writers to begin writing descriptions of Technorati tags. That same year, Technorati acquired the online ad agency Adengage. Technorati CEO Richard Jalichandra wanted to use the AdEngage platform to expand Technorati Media's offering, starting with an expansion of their advertising business from higher traffic sites. The AdEngage network added a reported 12 billion monthly impression growth to the Technorati Media Network.

In 2009, Blogcritics underwent a complete site redesign and switched content management systems. That same year, Technorati decided to stop indexing blogs and sites in languages other than English in order to focus only on the English-language blogosphere. As a result, thousands of sites in various languages were no longer rated by the Technorati service.

In 2014, Technorati stopped indexing blogs altogether, refocusing its efforts on its advertising business.

In 2016, Synacor acquired Technorati for $3 million.

== See also ==
- Folksonomy
- Social network aggregation
- Social bookmarking
- List of social bookmarking websites
- Models of collaborative tagging
- Tag (metadata)
- Crowdsourcing
- Web 2.0
