= Google Bookmarks =

Online bookmarking service launched in 2005

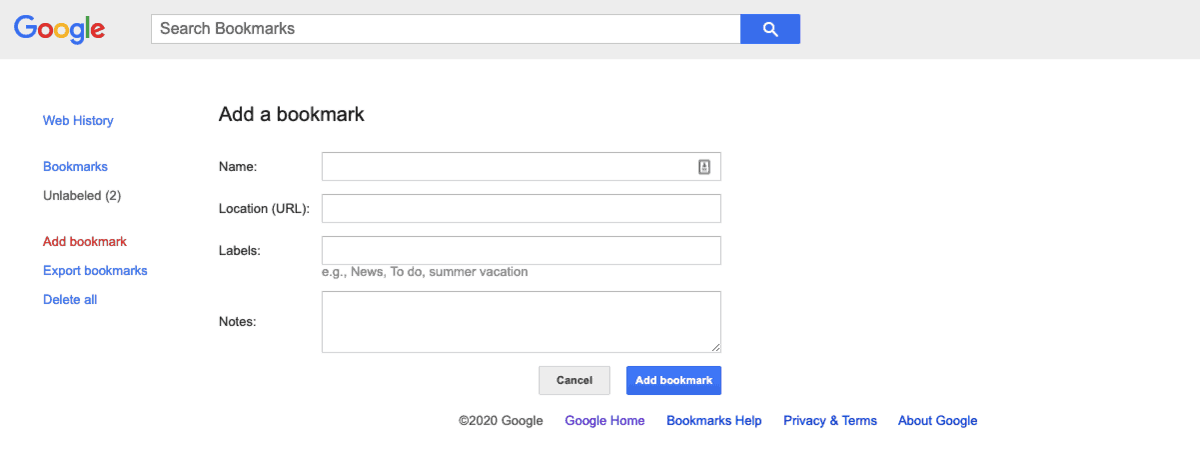
- Website type: Social bookmarking
- Dissolved: September 30, 2021
- Owner: Google
- Website: google.com/bookmarks/ (no longer active)
- Launched: October 10, 2005
- Current status: Discontinued

Google Bookmarks was an online bookmarking service from Google, launched on October 10, 2005. It was an early cloud-based service that allowed users to bookmark webpages and add labels or notes. The service never became widely adopted by Google users.

Users could securely access their bookmarks on any device by signing into their Google Account. The online service was designed to store a single user's bookmarks as opposed to social and enterprise online bookmarking services that encouraged sharing bookmarks. The bookmarks were searchable, and searches were performed on the full text of the bookmark; including page title, labels and notes.

Additionally, a simple bookmarklet (JavaScript function) labeled Google Bookmark was at the bottom of the Google Bookmarks page which could be dragged to the toolbar of any browser to make bookmarking more convenient. This opened a window which simplified the process to save the bookmark to Google Bookmarks and add notes and labels.

The service was discontinued on September 30, 2021.

== See also ==
- Bookmark (digital)
- Comparison of enterprise bookmarking platforms
- Social bookmarking
- List of social bookmarking websites
