= SiteBar =

Online book manager

- Developers: Ondrej Brablc, SiteBar Development Team
- Stable release: 3.4 (12-FEB-2014) [±]
- Preview release: 3.3.13 (14-JUL-2008) [±]
- Written in: PHP
- Available in: English and 20+ languages
- Type: Social bookmarking
- License: GNU General Public License
- Website: sitebar.org

SiteBar is a free online bookmark manager that is available in more than 20 languages. Users can store their bookmarks on a private or public SiteBar server, access them online, and share them with multiple user groups. It features sidebar integration into web browsers and can also import bookmarks from web browsers.

The SiteBar bookmark server is open source software published under the GPL, which enables anybody to run their own SiteBar server and keep their bookmarks under their control.

== See also ==
- Social bookmarking
- List of social bookmarking sites
- List of Firefox extensions
