= BookmarkSync =

Automatic synchronization service

- Developer: SyncIT.com Inc.
- Stable release: Windows: 3.0.0 (August 2010; 15 years ago) [±] Mac OS X: 1.0.4 (September 14, 2005; 20 years ago) [±]
- Operating system: Cross-platform
- Type: Browser synchronizer
- Website: bookmarksync.com (archive)

BookmarkSync is an automatic synchronization service that allows users to access their bookmarks or favorites from any computer or web browser. The BookmarkSync client runs as a program within the computer's system tray and monitors the bookmarks in the user's browser, automatically uploading any changes to a central server.

Web browsers supported by BookmarkSync include Firefox, Internet Explorer, Safari, Opera, SeaMonkey, and Netscape.

== History ==
SyncIT.com Inc. was founded by Michael Berneis and Terence Way in November 1998. The website went live in March 1999. After a server failure in September 2003, the entire project was open-sourced. The rights for SyncIT.com were taken over by Jhas Dean, who ran Sync2It.com and BookmarkSync.com. Dean developed a new client for the latest browsers, including Firefox and Mac platform.

As of 2022, the BookMarkSync open source project no longer exists.

== Features ==
The BookmarkSync client software enables social bookmarking and bookmark data clustering. The user data input requirements of web-based systems incorporating tagging to build a folksonomy, are eliminated by the automated BookmarkSync client software. Sync2It.com has added bookmark clustering and user bookmark ratios to their search results. Recent updates include BookmarkSync client software include support for Unicode, fast search and locate, local backup and restore functions, local site validation, social bookmark browsing, and multiple language support (German, French, Danish, Dutch, Czech, and Spanish). The BookmarkSync service is free.
