= SkaDate Dating Software =

- Original author(s): Emil Sarnogoev
- Developer(s): Skalfa LLC
- Initial release: December 2004; 13 years ago
- Stable release: 2.0 / January 9, 2019; 6 years ago
- Written in: PHP, MySQL, JavaScript, CSS
- Available in: 12 languages
- List of languages English (official support), French, German, Dutch, Spanish, Danish, Russian, Turkish, Czech, Bosnian, Portuguese, Indonesian
- Type: Social software, social networking, Community software, Dating software
- License: Proprietary software
- Website: skadate.com

SkaDate Dating Software is an open-source-based social networking and dating software for the creation of online communities and online dating websites. The underlying core of the software employs Oxwall base, written in PHP/MySQL with Model–view–controller pattern. The lowest versions required to run the software are PHP 5.3, Apache2, and MySQL 5.0. The software architecture is written in the way to allow on-the-fly extension with native and third-party plugins available in the Oxwall Store.

The open source platform behind the software allows third-party developers and freelance programmers to substantially modify the code, as well as create new independent plugins and themes for SkaDate. The level of support for third-party modifications is significant, compared to other similar products.

== History ==
The SkaDate software was first developed in 2004 by Skalfa LLC (formerly Skalfa eCommerce). Mobile dating applications developed by a third-party were added in 2012. After going through 9 stable versions as a stand-alone software product, SkaDate switched to Oxwall platform in 2014. In-house developed native iOS application replaced the third-party one late in 2014, with Android application released in the beginning of 2015. The adoption of Oxwall platform allowed for the non-commercial release of the developer version of the software, as well as opened doors for software extension through plugins created by Oxwall developers community. Speaking at 2016 iDate Online Dating Conference SkaDate creator Emil Sarnogoev said that industry focus dictates shifting, even more, development focus towards further refining mobile apps for social community and dating markets.
