= Furl =

Furl (from File Uniform Resource Locators) was a free social bookmarking website that allowed members to store searchable copies of webpages and share them with others. Every member received 5 gigabytes of storage space. The site was founded by Mike Giles in 2003 and purchased by LookSmart in September 2004. Diigo (a web annotation, social bookmarking & research tool website) bought it from LookSmart in exchange for equity.

== Features ==
Furl enabled members to bookmark, annotate, and share web pages. Topics were used to categorize saved sites, similar to the tagging feature of other social websites. Additionally, a user could write comments, save clippings, assign each bookmark a rating and keywords (which are given greater weight while searching), and have an option of private or public storage for each topic or item archived.

Considered one of its main features, Furl also privately archived a complete copy of the HTML of each page that a user bookmarks, making it accessible even if the original content was modified or removed, an antidote for link rot. This also allowed full text searches to be made within the archive. However, as highlighted under limitations below, images that were embedded using links were not archived with user's copy of the HTML page, so images sometimes disappeared over time. To avoid claims of copyright violations, this archived copy was visible only to the member who bookmarked the page. Other users were directed to the publisher's site, where the content could be viewed depending on membership requirements and privacy settings.

Users could see lists of other users who have furled a URL, and read their comments (if made public) to find users who share interests, supporting folksonomy. A dynamic recommendation list was automatically generated for each user based on the sites already saved by him or her and other users with similar interests. Lists of the most popular items for today, this week, and this month (and by topic) were also available. It was possible to subscribe to a user's archive (or to a set of topics in a user's archive) to get daily email notifications whenever new items were filed.

Furl allowed bookmarks to be imported from (and exported to) Internet Explorer, Mozilla/Firefox, and Delicious; and also supported exporting of the entire saved archives to ZIP formats, and export metadata to XML format. There were other import/export functions, including various citation formats (MLA, APA, Chicago, CBE, BibTeX, and RIS/EndNote). Toolbars and bookmarklets are available for Internet Explorer and Firefox to quicken the bookmarking process.

== Limitations ==
Images which were embedded links were not archived with the HTML page. For example, when an HTML page was archived via Furl, the location of the JPG from the HTML content was saved, thus pulling up that image when the user's personal copy was loaded; however, if that image no longer exists on the original server, it was lost and will not display with the user's archived copy. So, a Furled site with many pictures could end up being just text.

The search result displayed items from the entire Furl archive, or only from a user's own archive, but the sequence of these results was automatically ordered. There was no option to display results by date order, by popularity order, or in any other particular sequence. It was not obvious how the results are ordered.

The popularity of Furl exposed users to performance problems which began in the latter half of 2006 and persisted into 2007.

== Updates ==
New features were released in early 2007, including an updated user-interface. On January 30, 2008, Furl unveiled an updated user interface. Furl shut down its services on April 17, 2009.

== See also ==
- Diigo
- List of social software
- Link rot
- Web archiving
