= Hashtag =

Metadata tag prefixed with #

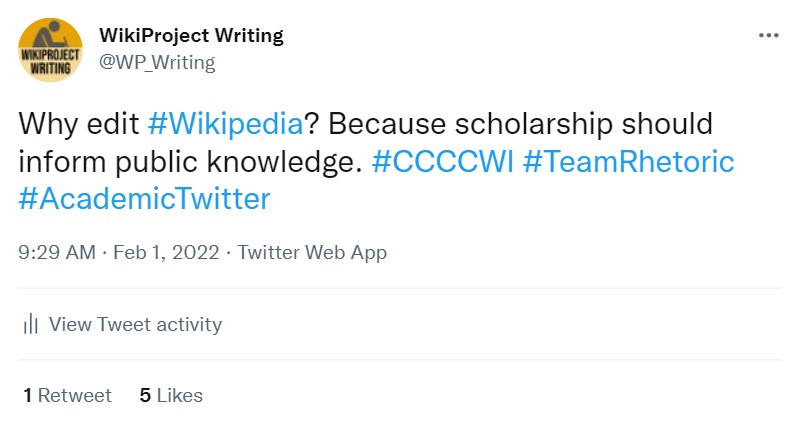
A post (tweet) on the social network X (Twitter) with several hashtags colored in blue text.

A hashtag is a metadata tag operator that is prefaced by the hash symbol, #. On social media, hashtags are used on microblogging and photo-sharing services–especially Twitter and Tumblr–as a form of user-generated tagging that enables cross-referencing of content by topic or theme. For example, a search within Instagram for the hashtag #flowers returns all posts that have been tagged with that term. After the initial hash symbol, a hashtag may include letters, numerals or other punctuation.

The use of hashtags was first proposed by American blogger and product consultant Chris Messina in a 2007 tweet. Messina made no attempt to patent the use because he felt that "they were born of the internet, and owned by no one". Hashtags became entrenched in the culture of Twitter and soon emerged across Instagram, Facebook, and YouTube. In June 2014, hashtag was added to the Oxford English Dictionary as "a word or phrase with the symbol # in front of it, used on social media websites and apps so that you can search for all messages with the same subject".

== Origin and acceptance ==
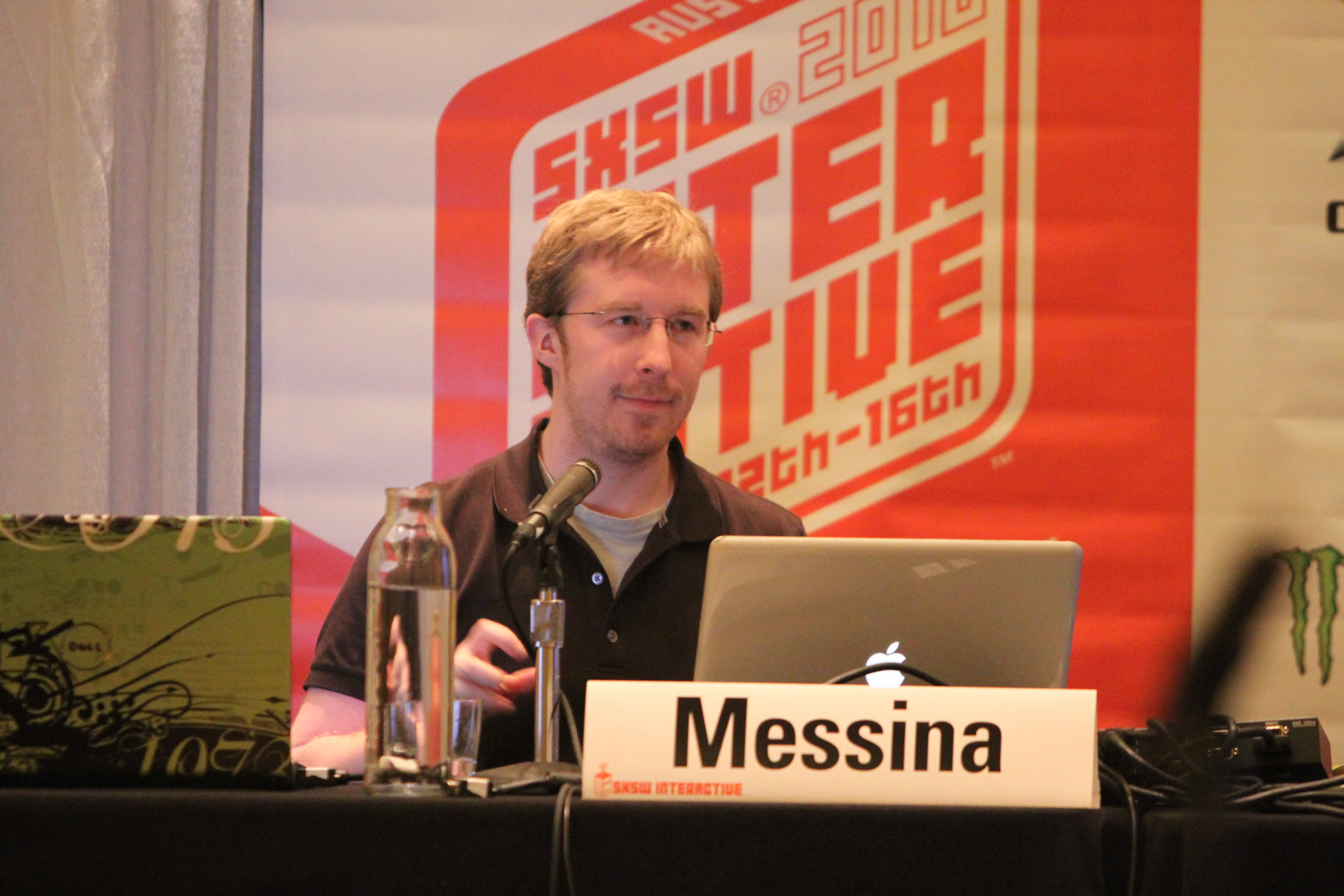
Chris Messina suggested using hashtags on Twitter

The number sign or hash symbol, #, has long been used in information technology to highlight specific pieces of text. In 1970, the number sign was used to denote immediate address mode in the assembly language of the PDP-11 when placed next to a symbol or a number, and around 1973, '#' was introduced in the C programming language to indicate special keywords that the C preprocessor had to process first. The pound sign was adopted for use within IRC (Internet Relay Chat) networks around 1988 to label groups and topics. Channels or topics that are available across an entire IRC network are prefixed with a hash symbol # (as opposed to those local to a server, which uses an ampersand '&').

The use of the pound sign in IRC inspired Chris Messina to propose a similar system on Twitter to tag topics of interest on the microblogging network. He proposed the usage of hashtags on Twitter:

How do you feel about using # (pound) for groups. As in #barcamp [msg]?

— Chris Messina, ("factoryjoe"), August 23, 2007

According to Messina, he suggested use of the hashtag to make it easy for lay users without specialized knowledge of search protocols to find specific relevant content. Therefore, the hashtag "was created organically by Twitter users as a way to categorize messages".

The first published use of the term "hash tag" was in a blog post "Hash Tags = Twitter Groupings" by Stowe Boyd, on August 26, 2007, according to lexicographer Ben Zimmer, chair of the American Dialect Society's New Words Committee.

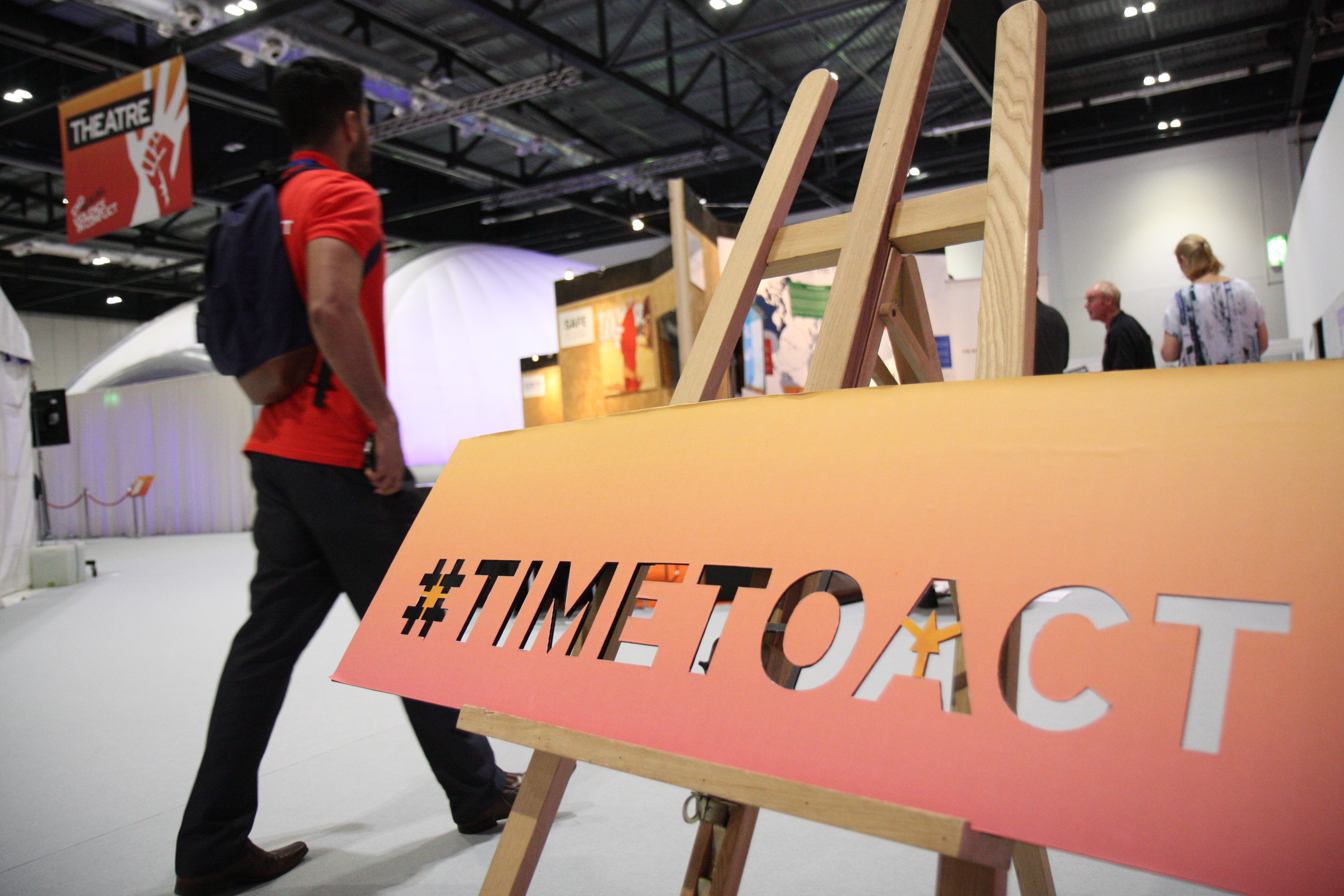
Sign depicting a "#TimeToAct" hashtag at a 2014 conference

Messina's suggestion to use the hashtag was not immediately adopted by Twitter, but the convention gained popular acceptance when hashtags were used in tweets relating to the 2007 San Diego forest fires in Southern California. The hashtag gained international acceptance during the 2009–2010 Iranian election protests; Twitter users used both English- and Persian-language hashtags in communications during the events.

Hashtags have since played critical roles in recent social movements such as #jesuischarlie, #BLM, and #MeToo.

Beginning July 2, 2009, Twitter began to hyperlink all hashtags in tweets to Twitter search results for the hashtagged word (and for the standard spelling of commonly misspelled words). In 2010, Twitter introduced "Trending Topics" on the Twitter front page, displaying hashtags that are rapidly becoming popular, and the significance of trending hashtags has become so great that the company makes significant efforts to foil attempts to spam the trending list. During the 2010 World Cup, Twitter explicitly encouraged the use of hashtags with the temporary deployment of "hashflags", which replaced hashtags of three-letter country codes with their respective national flags.

Other platforms such as YouTube and Gawker Media followed in officially supporting hashtags, and real-time search aggregators such as Google Real-Time Search began supporting hashtags.

== Format ==
A hashtag must begin with a hash (#) character followed by other characters, and is terminated by a space or the end of the line. Some platforms may require the # to be preceded with a space. Most or all platforms that support hashtags permit the inclusion of letters (without diacritics), numerals, and underscores. Other characters may be supported on a platform-by-platform basis. Some characters, such as "&", are generally not supported as they may already serve other search functions. Hashtags are not case sensitive (a search for "#hashtag" will match "#HashTag" as well), but the use of embedded capitals (i.e., CamelCase) increases legibility and improves accessibility.

Languages that do not use word dividers handle hashtags differently. In China, microblogs Sina Weibo and Tencent Weibo use a double-hashtag-delimited #HashName# format, since the lack of spacing between Chinese characters necessitates a closing tag. Twitter uses a different syntax for Chinese characters and orthographies with similar spacing conventions: the hashtag contains unspaced characters, separated from preceding and following text by spaces (e.g., '我 #爱 你' instead of '我#爱你') or by zero-width non-joiner characters before and after the hashtagged element, to retain a linguistically natural appearance (displaying as unspaced '我‌#爱‌你', but with invisible non-joiners delimiting the hashtag).

=== Etiquette and regulation ===
Some communities may limit, officially or unofficially, the number of hashtags permitted on a single post.

Misuse of hashtags can lead to account suspensions. Twitter warns that adding hashtags to unrelated tweets, or repeated use of the same hashtag without adding to a conversation can filter an account from search results, or suspend the account.

Individual platforms may deactivate certain hashtags either for being too generic to be useful, such as #photography on Instagram, or due to their use to facilitate illegal activities.

=== Alternative formats ===
In 2009, StockTwits began using ticker symbols preceded by the dollar sign (e.g., $XRX). In July 2012, Twitter began supporting the tag convention and dubbed it the "cashtag". The convention has extended to national currencies, and Cash App has implemented the cashtag to mark usernames.

== Function ==
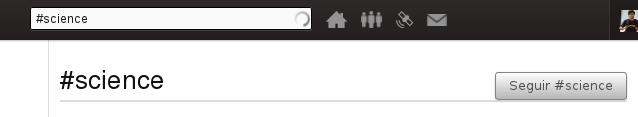
Search bar in the header of a social networking site, searching for most recent posts containing the hashtag #science

Hashtags are particularly useful in unmoderated forums that lack a formal ontological organization. Hashtags help users find content similar interest. Hashtags are neither registered nor controlled by any one user or group of users. They do not contain any set definitions, meaning that a single hashtag can be used for any number of purposes, and that the accepted meaning of a hashtag can change with time.

Hashtags intended for discussion of a particular event tend to use an obscure wording to avoid being caught up with generic conversations on similar subjects, such as a cake festival using #cakefestival rather than simply #cake. However, this can also make it difficult for topics to become "trending topics" because people often use different spelling or words to refer to the same topic. For topics to trend, there must be a consensus, whether silent or stated, that the hashtag refers to that specific topic.

Hashtags may be used informally to express context around a given message, with no intent to categorize the message for later searching, sharing, or other reasons. Hashtags may thus serve as a reflexive meta-commentary.

This can help express contextual cues or offer more depth to the information or message that appears with the hashtag. "My arms are getting darker by the minute. #toomuchfaketan". Another function of the hashtag can be used to express personal feelings and emotions. For example, with "It's Monday!! #excited #sarcasm" in which the adjectives are directly indicating the emotions of the speaker.

Verbal use of the word hashtag is sometimes used in informal conversations. Use may be humorous, such as "I'm hashtag confused!" By August 2012, use of a hand gesture, sometimes called the "finger hashtag", in which the index and middle finger of both hands are extended and arranged perpendicularly to form the hash, was documented.

=== Co-optation by other industries ===
Companies, businesses, and advocacy organizations have taken advantage of hashtag-based discussions for promotion of their products, services or campaigns.

In the early 2010s, some television broadcasters began to employ hashtags related to programs in digital on-screen graphics, to encourage viewers to participate in a backchannel of discussion via social media prior to, during, or after the program. Television commercials have sometimes contained hashtags for similar purposes.

The increased usage of hashtags as brand promotion devices has been compared to the promotion of branded "keywords" by AOL in the late 1990s and early 2000s, as such keywords were also promoted at the end of television commercials and series episodes.

Organized real-world events have used hashtags and ad hoc lists for discussion and promotion among participants. Hashtags are used as beacons by event participants to find each other, both on Twitter and, in many cases, during actual physical events.

Since the 2012–13 season, the NBA has allowed fans to vote players in as All-Star Game starters on Twitter and Facebook using #NBAVOTE.

Hashtag-centered biomedical Twitter campaigns have shown to increase the reach, promotion, and visibility of healthcare-related open innovation platforms.

=== Non-commercial use ===
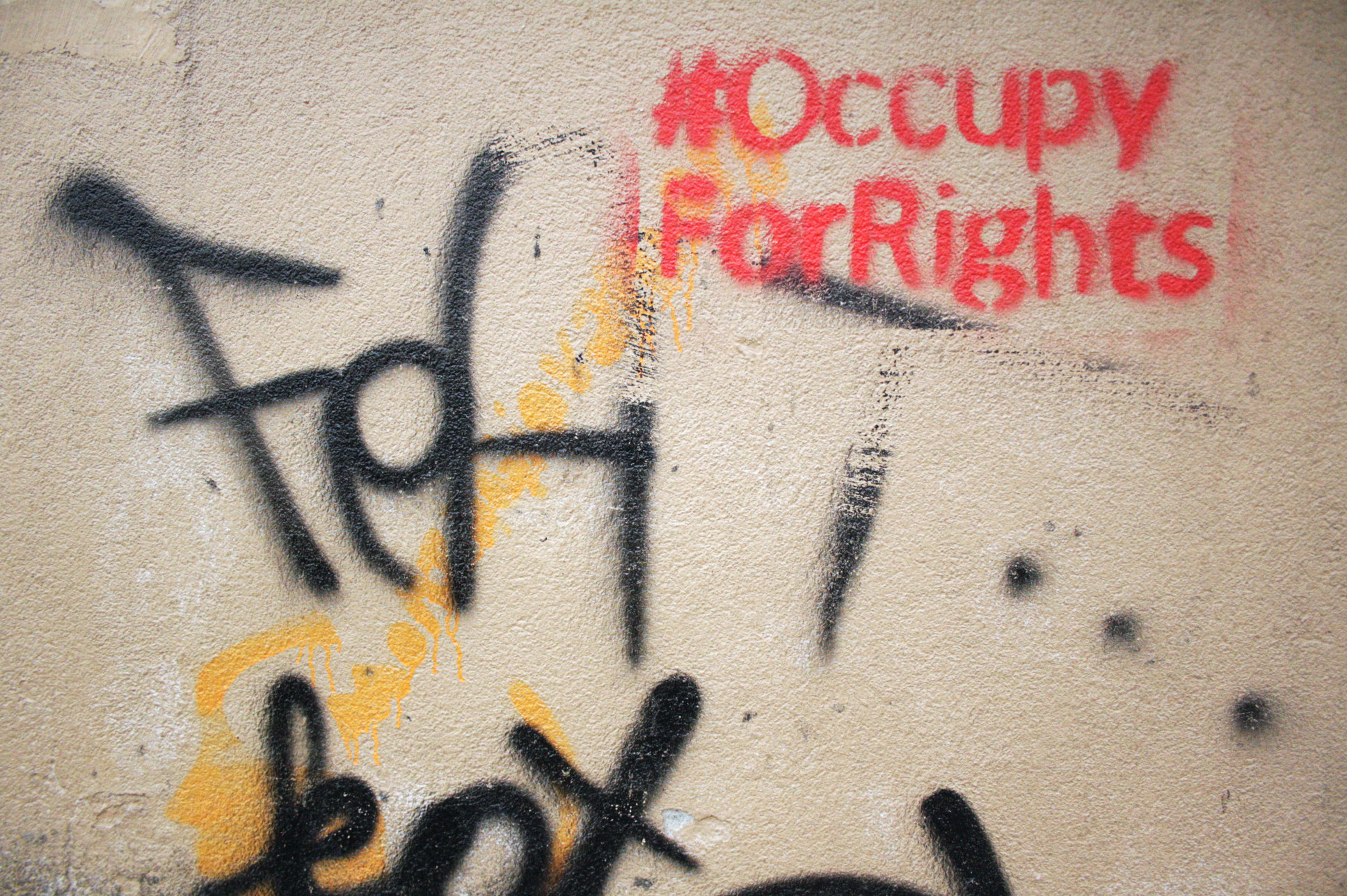
Stencil graffiti promoting the hashtag #OccupyForRights

Political protests and campaigns in the early 2010s, such as #OccupyWallStreet and #LibyaFeb17, have been organized around hashtags or have made extensive usage of hashtags for the promotion of discussion. Hashtags are frequently employed to either show support or opposition towards political figures. For example, the hashtag #MakeAmericaGreatAgain signifies support for Trump, whereas #DisinfectantDonnie expresses ridicule of Trump. Hashtags have also been used to promote official events; the Finnish Ministry of Foreign Affairs officially titled the 2018 Russia–United States Summit as the "#HELSINKI2018 Meeting".

Hashtags have been used to gather customer criticism of large companies. In January 2012, McDonald's created the #McDStories hashtag so that customers could share positive experiences about the restaurant chain, but the marketing effort was cancelled after two hours when critical tweets outnumbered praising ones.

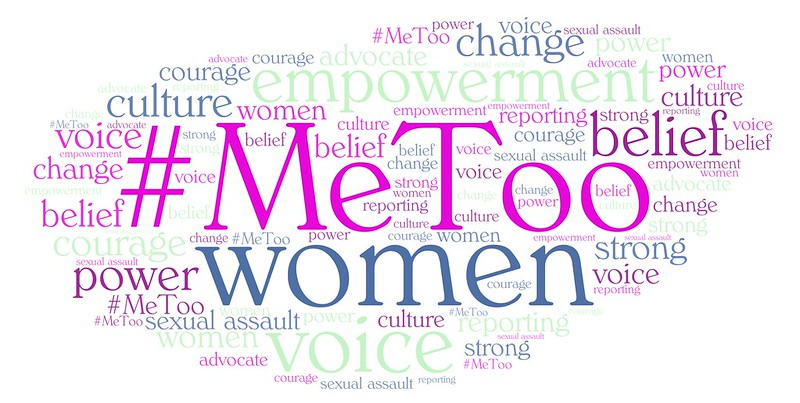
The rise of hashtag activism

In 2017, the #MeToo hashtag became viral in response to the sexual harassment accusations against Harvey Weinstein. The use of this hashtag can be considered part of hashtag activism, spreading awareness across eighty-five different countries with more than seventeen million Tweets using the hashtag #MeToo. This hashtag was not only used to spread awareness of accusations regarding Harvey Weinstein but allowed different women to share their experiences of sexual violence. Using this hashtag birthed multiple different hashtags in connection to #MeToo to encourage more women to share their stories, resulting in further spread of the phenomenon of hashtag activism. The use of hashtags, especially, in this case, allowed for better and easier access to search for content related to this social media movement.

==== Sentiment analysis ====
The use of hashtags also reveals what feelings or sentiment an author attaches to a statement. This can range from the obvious, where a hashtag directly describes the state of mind, to the less obvious. For example, words in hashtags are the strongest predictor of whether or not a statement is sarcastic—a difficult AI problem.

=== Professional development and education ===
Hashtags play an important role for employees and students in professional fields and education. In industry, individuals' engagement with a hashtags can provide opportunities for them develop and gain some professional knowledge in their fields.

In education, research on language teachers who engaged in the #MFLtwitterati hashtag demonstrates the uses of hashtags for creating community and sharing teaching resources. The majority of participants reported positive impact on their teaching strategies as inspired by many ideas shared by different individuals in the Hashtag.

Emerging research in communication and learning demonstrates how hashtag practices influence the teaching and development of students. An analysis of eight studies examined the use of hashtags in K–12 classrooms and found significant results. These results indicated that hashtags assisted students in voicing their opinions. In addition, hashtags also helped students understand self-organisation and the concept of space beyond place. Related research demonstrated how high school students engagement with hashtag communication practices allowed them to develop story telling skills and cultural awareness.

For young people at risk of poverty and social exclusion during the COVID-19 pandemic, Instagram hashtags were shown in a 2022 article to foster scientific education and promote remote learning.

== In popular culture ==
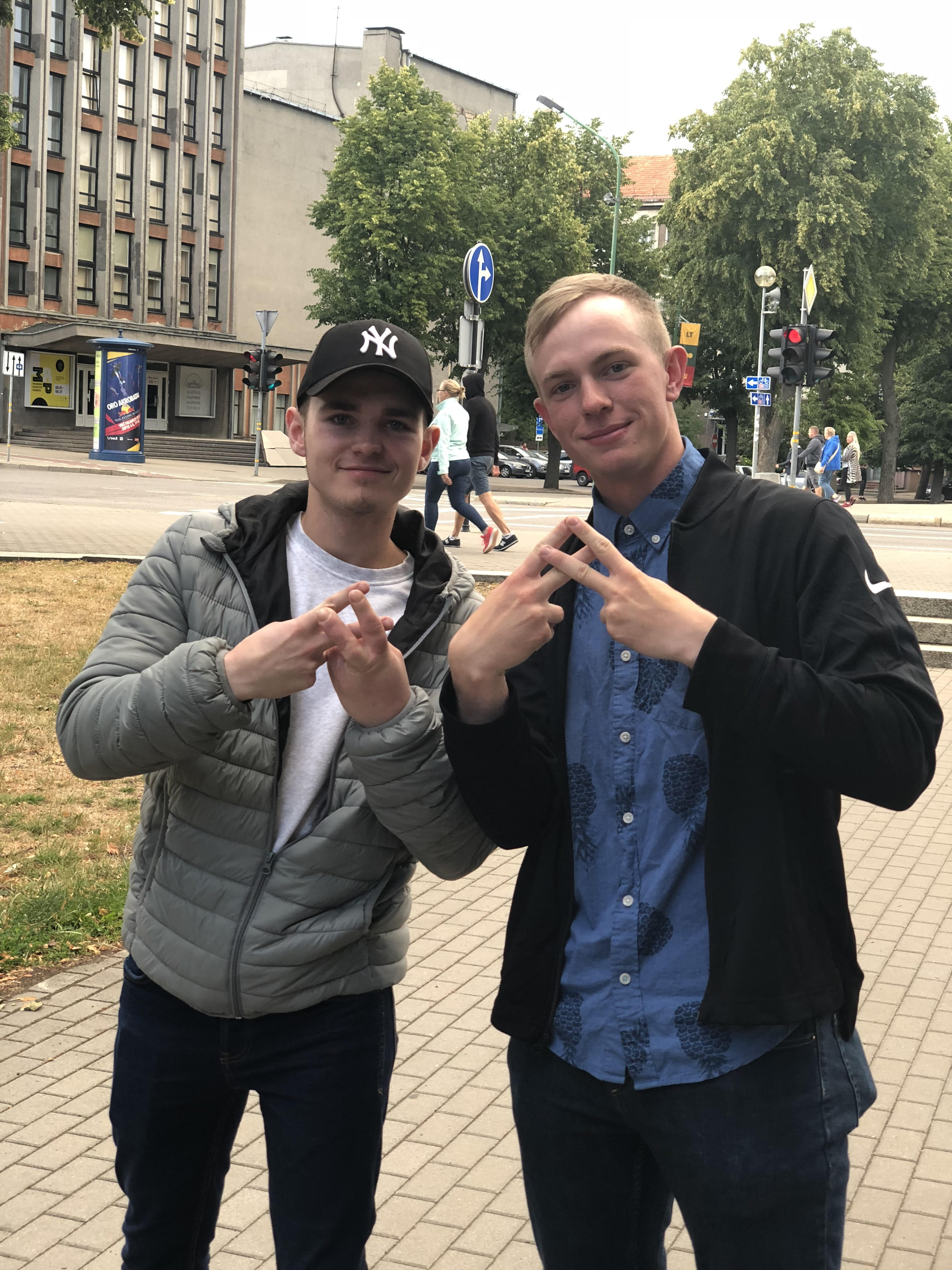
Two young men displaying the hashtag hand gesture

During the April 2011 Canadian party leader debate, Jack Layton, then-leader of the New Democratic Party, referred to Conservative Prime Minister Stephen Harper's crime policies as "a [sic] hashtag fail" (presumably #fail).

In 2010 Kanye West used the term "hashtag rap" to describe a style of rapping that, according to Rizoh of the Houston Press, uses "a metaphor, a pause, and a one-word punch line, often placed at the end of a rhyme". Rappers Nicki Minaj, Big Sean, Drake, and Lil Wayne are credited with the popularization of hashtag rap, while the style has been criticized by Ludacris, The Lonely Island, and various music writers.

On September 13, 2013, a hashtag, #TwitterIPO, appeared in the headline of a New York Times front-page article regarding Twitter's initial public offering.

In 2014 Bird's Eye foods released "Mashtags", a mashed potato product with pieces shaped either like @ or #.

In 2019, the British Ornithological Union included a hash character in the design of its new Janet Kear Union Medal, to represent "science communication and social media".

== Linguistic analysis ==
Some linguists argue that hashtagging is a morphological process and that hashtags function as words.

The popularity of a hashtag is influenced less by its conciseness and clarity, and more by the presence of preexisting popular hashtags with similar syntactic formats. This suggests that, similar to word formation, users may see the syntax of an existing viral hashtag as a blueprint for creating new ones. For instance, the viral hashtag #JeSuisCharlie gave rise to other popular indicative mood hashtags like #JeVoteMacron and #JeChoisisMarine.

== See also ==
- URI fragment
- Tagging
- Mentioning a user's profile by using @ tagging in blogging.
- Webring, an early-web decentralized mechanism to link websites with a common theme
- Folksonomy
- Social bookmarking
- Models of collaborative tagging
- Web 2.0
