= KeepRecipes =

- Website type: Social cataloging, social networking
- Available in: English
- Owner: Phil Michaelson
- Website: http://keeprecipes.com/
- Registration: Optional
- Launched: 2011
- Current status: Inactive

KeepRecipes is a social networking website and mobile application that specializes in social cataloging. Members organize and share favorite recipes from any website. The full service has been called "like Instapaper for food" and a "recipe manager for food lovers".

KeepRecipes was started by the team from KartMe. They began by launching charity cookbooks with Iron Chef Masaharu Morimoto, Top Chef All Star Anita Lo, Best Selling Author Mark Bittman, and Model Lauren Bush Lauren. The cookbooks raised funds for the American Red Cross's efforts in Japan.

KeepRecipes is backed by DreamIt Ventures.
