= Oneview =

English and German social bookmarking website

OneView
- Website type: Social Bookmarking
- Available in: English, German
- Headquarters: 66 Vogelsanger Strasse, Koeln, North Rhine-Westphalia, Germany
- Owner: oneview GmbH
- Website: http://www.oneview.com/
- Commercial: yes
- Registration: partly
- Launched: 1998
- Current status: defunct

OneView was an English and German-speaking application for social bookmarking. The platform has already been brought into being from the multimedia-agency Denkwerk in 1998 and was therefore one of the first providers for social bookmarking worldwide. According to a statement, the platform has amassed a collection of more than 5 million bookmarks from its members.

== Functions ==
The basic functions from OneView, as a social bookmarking service, consisted in saving and organizing links, tagging of links, central copying of saved links and in the provision of a spatio-temporal independent access on the link collection of one or all members. Moreover, the collected information can be shared with other users.

In order that the user can find the information quickly, OneView provided a search function. In this search, human filtered information is presented to the user. The combination of different tags, as a search survey, serves to find the favoured information quickly as well.

For registered users there is the possibility to set up an individual collection of bookmarks and to provide them with tags. Thus, the user has access on the individually collected links and can retrieve them at any time. The bookmarks collected by the user can be labelled as private or public.

== History and development ==
Due to early establishment, OneView is seen as one of the pioneers of the current social bookmarking and search offers. In these days, the idea has been welcomed from its users and has been available in 12 speeches online in 2001. OneView was awarded a German Multimedia Award for Service in 1999 and the "World Medal" of the New York Festivals. In August 2000, the company was awarded the "Best in eBusiness Award".

The OneView 2.0 platform was released as beta in 2005, then in March 2007 the 2.0 platform came out of beta and replaced the 1.0 platform. In 2015 this service was closed.

== See also ==
- Web 2.0
- Social bookmarking
- List of social software
