= AddThis =

Social bookmarking service

- Website type: Online advertising
- Owner: Oracle Corporation
- Website: www.addthis.com
- Commercial: No (defunct as of May 31, 2023)
- Launched: October 2006

AddThis was a free social bookmarking service that could be integrated into a website with the use of a web widget. Once the widget was added, visitors of a website using the service could bookmark or share an item using a variety of services, such as Facebook, MySpace, Pinterest, and Twitter. AddThis collected users' behavioural data, even if they do not share anything. The site reached 1.9 billion unique visitors monthly and was used by more than 15 million web publishers. The service operated under companies including AddThis, Inc., AddThis, LLC, and Clearspring Technologies, Inc. until the company's acquisition by Oracle Corporation on January 5, 2016. AddThis would continue to run until all services were terminated on May 31, 2023.

== History ==
AddThis, LLC was founded in 2004 by Hooman Radfar, Austin Fath, and Dominique Vonarburg. By 2007, AddThis had served more than 100 million widgets to websites, with website growth at 100 percent per month and some two million views a day.

In 2008, Clearspring Technologies, Inc. acquired AddThis, LLC, with the intent of creating a single content sharing platform for publishers under one brand: AddThis. The combined platform per Comscore was 254 million unique users. Clearspring upgraded AddThis with widget-sharing capabilities from LaunchPad, then discontinued the LaunchPad offering, reaching 600 million unique users by the end of 2009.

In 2010, the company launched the Clearspring Audience Platform, a service for brand marketers to deliver interest-based display advertising across the web, which topped 1 billion unique users and was used by over 8 million unique domains. Clearspring acquired data science company XGraph in 2011. In September, the company hired a new CEO, Ramsey McGrory, formerly of RightMedia and Yahoo!, with co-founder Radfar becoming executive chairman.

On May 10, 2012, Clearspring changed its name to AddThis, its most widely used product. The company launched three sharing and analytics tools: Trending Content Box, Follow Tools, and Welcome Bar, as well as supporting content sharing for Pinterest and Web Intents. In August, the company began offering social login. In September, CFO Richard Harris took over as CEO.

In March 2014, the company was named number one on the Top 30 Syndicated Ad Focus Entities by comScore.

On January 5, 2016, AddThis was purchased by Oracle Corporation for almost $200 million. Before being acquired, AddThis had raised roughly $73 million to date.

On April 1, 2023, Oracle announced that it would terminate AddThis services as of May 31 of that year.

== Like button lawsuit ==
The company was the subject of a lawsuit by Rembrandt Social Media, which also sued Facebook, for the use of patents that were first implemented in Surfbook and belonging to deceased Dutch programmer Joannes Jozef Everardus van Der Meer that involve the "Like" button.

== Canvas fingerprint tracking ==
In July 2014, ProPublica exposed AddThis for uniquely identifying and tracking users using a controversial technique called canvas fingerprinting. With a storage and user identification method that is harder to block than cookie-based tracking, AddThis was able to more pervasively identify and track users' online browsing history on websites such as WhiteHouse.gov and YouPorn.com. YouPorn removed AddThis after the ProPublica article was published, citing that they were "completely unaware that AddThis contained a tracking software that had the potential to jeopardize the privacy of our users."

AddThis allows users to opt-out of their tracking tools via their corporate website; the opt-out process requires the user to provide name, country of residence and physical address.

== See also ==
- AddToAny
- List of social bookmarking websites
- ShareThis
