= Sematext =

Software services company

Sematext Group, Inc.
- Company type: Private
- Industry: Information technology Information access Open-source software
- Founded: 2007
- Headquarters: Brooklyn, New York, United States
- Area served: Americas; Europe; Asia; Australia
- Key people: Otis Gospodnetić (Founder)
- Products: Sematext Cloud & Sematext Enterprise; Infrastructure Monitoring; Log Management; Real User Monitoring; Synthetic Monitoring; Transaction Tracing
- Services: Search-engine consulting Big Data consulting Lucene, Solr, and Elasticsearch Production Support; Solr and Elasticsearch training Consulting and development around Elasticsearch and Apache Solr
- Website: sematext.com

Sematext is a globally distributed organization that builds cloud and on-premises systems for application performance monitoring, alerting, anomaly detection, centralized logging, logging management, analytics, and real user monitoring. The company also provides search and Big Data consulting services and offers production support and training for Solr and Elasticsearch to clients. The company markets its core products to engineers and DevOps and its services to organizations using Elasticsearch, Solr, Lucene, Hadoop, HBase, Docker, Spark, Kafka, and other platforms. Otis Gospodnetić (the co-author of Lucene in Action, the founder of Simpy, and committer on Lucene, Solr, Nutch, Apache Mahout, and Open Relevance projects) founded Sematext. Sematext is headquartered in Brooklyn, NY, and is privately held.

Sematext Cloud (SaaS) and Sematext Enterprise (on-premises) provide infrastructure monitoring, application performance monitoring, transaction tracing, real user & synthetic monitoring, and log management.
