= My Web =

- Website type: Social bookmarking
- Founded: June 2005
- Dissolved: October 2009; 17 years ago
- Owner: Yahoo!
- Website: myweb.yahoo.com
- Registration: Free
- Current status: Defunct

My Web (also stylized as MyWeb; previously called Yahoo! My Web and later My Web 2.0) was a social bookmarking website launched by Yahoo! in June 2005. It allowed users to bookmark a web page, along with a description, either just for themselves, for selected contacts or for everyone. The user could also add tags so that other users could search for tags and see the bookmarked site. Users could add contacts to their My Web account, which allowed them to view the user's tags and also some tags that the viewer submitted.

In late 2006, Yahoo! introduced an improved Yahoo! Bookmarks service, with a tagging facility, and encouraged My Web users to transfer their bookmarks to this service.

In February 2009, Yahoo! announced plans to shut down My Web on March 18, 2009. My Web bookmarks are automatically available for use within Yahoo! Bookmarks, and users were encouraged to switch to Delicious if they preferred a social bookmarking experience.

== See also ==
- Yahoo Answers
