= Web Intents =

Web Intents was an experimental framework for web-based inter-application communication and service discovery.

Web Intents consists of a discovery mechanism and a very light-weight RPC system between web applications, modelled after the Intents system in Android. In the context of the framework an Intent equals an action to be performed by a provider. Web Intents allow two web applications to communicate with each other, without either of them having to actually know what the other one is.

== Support ==
=== Client ===
- Google Chrome versions 18 to 23 natively supported Web Intents. This support was disabled in version 24, citing the existence of a "number of areas for development in both the API and specific user experience in Chrome".
- There is a JavaScript shim with support for IE 8, IE 9, Opera, Safari, Firefox 3+ and Chrome 3+.

=== Server ===
- There are some Web Intents proxy pages that make available some real services that don't yet support intents.
- AddThis supports Web Intents by their sharing tools regardless of browser support.

== History ==
Paul Kinlan of Google announced the Web Intents project in December 2010. He soon released a prototype API to GitHub. In August 2011 Google announced that Chrome would support Web Intents. Google and Mozilla have started co-operating to unify Web Intents and Mozilla's Web Activities (which tries to solve the same problem) into one proposal.

In November 2012, Greg Billock of Google announced that experimental support of Web Intents had been removed from Chrome.
