= Simpy =

- The Simpy "logo" as seen on the Simpy.com site.
- Website type: Online social bookmarking
- Owner: Otis Gospodnetic
- Creator: Otis Gospodnetic
- Website: www.simpy.com
- Registration: Optional
- Launched: May 2004; 22 years ago

Simpy was a web-based personal and social bookmarking service.

The service launched in May 2004. In 2010, it was acquired by Reuters and ceased operation as a social bookmarking site in April of that year.

== Service features ==
Simpy uses tags and tag clouds to aid bookmark recall and allows bookmarks to be shared or kept private. In addition to saving, tagging, and sharing links, users could also save, tag, and search free-text notes. Most data pages also had RSS feeds. Simpy's founder is one of the developers of Lucene, a popular text search toolkit. Thus, Simpy had powerful search capabilities.

The service allowed for cooperation via groups with different levels of privacy and for the discovery of relevant and new links via its watchlists and watchlist filters.

Simpy had a well-documented REST API suitable for mashups and integration with other applications and services.

== de.lirio.us user migration to Simpy ==
de.lirio.us was an open source clone of del.icio.us (criticized for its direct copying). It had technical problems, and in March 2006, its maintainer announced that Simpy would take over the de.lirio.us userbase. The transfer to Simpy was completed in July 2006.

== See also ==
- List of social bookmarking websites
