= Mister Wong =

German social bookmarking service (2006–2016)

- Website type: Social bookmarking
- Website: www.mister-wong.com
- Commercial: Yes
- Registration: Yes
- Launched: March 2006; 20 years ago
- Current status: Defunct

Mister Wong was one of the largest European free social bookmarking web services.

== History ==
The website was a German startup, established in 2006 by Kai Tietjen. The service ceased operation after being sold for €2500 in October 2016.

The service was available in German, English, Russian, Chinese, Spanish and French.

== Origin of name ==
The website extols its users to "Wong the Web!", a reference to the practice of Wonging, often employed by card counters in Blackjack.

== Controversy ==
Mister Wong's original logo, depicting a "cartoonish, nerdy East Asian man", brought on protests from many Asian-Americans. The website's creator subsequently issued an apology and removed the logo.

== See also ==
- Delicious
