= Bookmark manager =

Software to store web bookmarks

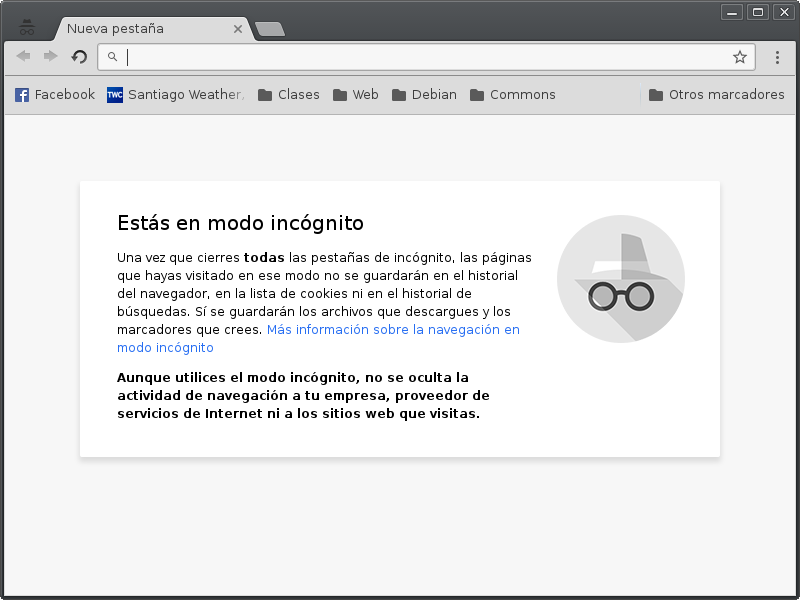
Bookmarks bar in Incognito mode

A bookmark manager is any software program or feature designed to store, organize, and display web bookmarks. The bookmarks feature included in each major web browser is a rudimentary bookmark manager. More capable bookmark managers are available online as web apps, mobile apps, or browser extensions. These often include features such as cloud synchronization, tagging, full-text search, or collaboration (e.g. Raindrop.io, Pinboard, Linkinize). Social bookmarking websites are bookmark managers. Start page browser extensions, new tab page browser extensions, and some browser start pages, also have bookmark presentation and organization features, which are typically tile-based. Some more general programs, such as certain note taking apps, have bookmark management functionality built-in.

== Types of bookmark managers and their features ==
Bookmark managers can be broadly divided into several types, depending on how they are implemented and used:

=== Built-in browser bookmark managers ===
All major web browsers include a basic bookmark manager. These typically allow users to:

- Save and organize bookmarks in folders
- Display bookmarks in a toolbar or menu
- Import and export bookmarks between browsers

While convenient, these built-in tools are often limited in terms of advanced organization, search, or collaboration.

=== Browser extensions and new tab/start page add-ons ===
Extensions for browsers such as Chrome, Firefox, and Edge often provide enhanced bookmarking features. Common functions include:

- Tag-based organization instead of folders
- Visual bookmark tiles with website icons or screenshots
- Quick access via the browser’s new tab page
- Synchronization across devices via cloud storage

Examples include start page extensions or new tab page replacements.

=== Dedicated web and mobile applications ===
Independent bookmark managers are available as cross-platform apps or web services. These often provide more advanced capabilities, such as:

- Full-text search within bookmark titles, notes, or saved page content
- Tagging and metadata support for flexible organization
- Offline access and synchronization across multiple devices
- Collaboration features for sharing collections with teams or clients
- Integrations with note-taking tools, productivity apps, or enterprise systems
- Security options such as encryption, single sign-on (SSO), or granular access control

=== Social bookmarking platforms ===
Social bookmarking websites emphasize public or community sharing of links. They often feature:

- Public collections and discovery of popular bookmarks
- Tagging (folksonomy) to support collaborative classification
- Social features such as following other users or voting on links
- Archiving to preserve links against link rot

Notable examples include historic platforms like Delicious, and modern services such as Pinboard or Raindrop.io.

== Notable bookmark managers ==
Over the years, a number of dedicated bookmark management tools have been developed as alternatives to the built-in functionality of web browsers. These typically provide advanced features such as full-text search, tag-based organization, workspace separation, or team collaboration. Examples include:

- Linkinize – a tag-based bookmark manager with support for collaborative workspaces and enterprise features such as SSO.
- Raindrop.io – a cross-platform bookmark manager with cloud sync and visual collections.
- Pocket – a read-it-later service with bookmarking and offline reading.
- Pinboard – a minimalist bookmarking service emphasizing archiving and API access.

== See also ==
Bookmark destinations

- Deep links
- Home pages

Types of bookmark management

- Enterprise bookmarking
  - Comparison of enterprise bookmarking platforms
- Social bookmarking
  - List of social bookmarking websites

Other weblink-based systems

- Search engine
  - Comparison of search engines with social bookmarking systems
  - Search engine results page
- Web directory
  - Lists of websites
