= Social software engineering =

Social software engineering (SSE) is a branch of software engineering that is concerned with the social aspects of software development and the developed software.

SSE focuses on the socialness of both software engineering and developed software. On the one hand, the consideration of social factors in software engineering activities, processes and CASE tools is deemed to be useful to improve the quality of both development process and produced software. Examples include the role of situational awareness and multi-cultural factors in collaborative software development. On the other hand, the dynamicity of the social contexts in which software could operate (e.g., in a cloud environment) calls for engineering social adaptability as a runtime iterative activity. Examples include approaches which enable software to gather users' quality feedback and use it to adapt autonomously or semi-autonomously.

SSE studies and builds socially-oriented tools to support collaboration and knowledge sharing in software engineering. SSE also investigates the adaptability of software to the dynamic social contexts in which it could operate and the involvement of clients and end-users in shaping software adaptation decisions at runtime. Social context includes norms, culture, roles and responsibilities, stakeholder's goals and interdependencies, end-users perception of the quality and appropriateness of each software behaviour, etc.

The participants of the 1st International Workshop on Social Software Engineering and Applications (SoSEA 2008) proposed the following characterization:

- Community-centered: Software is produced and consumed by and/or for a community rather than focusing on individuals
- Collaboration/collectiveness: Exploiting the collaborative and collective capacity of human beings
- Companionship/relationship: Making explicit the various associations among people
- Human/social activities: Software is designed consciously to support human activities and to address social problems
- Social inclusion: Software should enable social inclusion enforcing links and trust in communities

Thus, SSE can be defined as "the application of processes, methods, and tools to enable community-driven creation, management, deployment, and use of software in online environments".

One of the main observations in the field of SSE is that the concepts, principles, and technologies made for social software applications are applicable to software development itself as software engineering is inherently a social activity. SSE is not limited to specific activities of software development. Accordingly, tools have been proposed supporting different parts of SSE, for instance, social system design or social requirements engineering. Consequently vertical market software, such as software development tools, engineering tools, marketing tools or software that helps users in a decision-making process can profit from social components. Such vertical social software differentiates strongly in its user-base from traditional social software such as Yammer.
