= Faves.com =

Social bookmarking software

Blue Dot Inc.
- Type: Private
- Industry: Software & Programming
- Founded: Seattle, Washington (2004)
- Headquarters: Seattle, Washington
- Key people: Mohit Srivastava, Co-Founder
- Website: faves.com

Faves was a social bookmarking and networking software that installs a single browser button for users to "fave" a webpage, making a link to the page part of their Faves profile. Until October 2007, Faves was called Blue Dot. As of January 2012, the service has migrated to fave.net, and later on migrated to MaxiConnect.com and is no longer active on faves.com which says "Faves is evolving to social couponing."

== Features ==
While offering a service similar to the better-known del.icio.us, Faves had a wider range of functionality that encouraged interaction with "friends" in rating the content of linked webpages. When a registered user visited their Faves home page, they saw a summary of the bookmarks, called "Faves" by the company, that had been most recently shared by their friends.

In addition to features shared with other bookmarking and social bookmarking services, Faves provided an in-page dialog for saving a Fave, thumbnails generated from the page, dynamic voting, and topic-based auto-generated favorites pages.

== History ==
Blue Dot Inc. was co-founded in 2004 by Mohit Srivastava and Sumit Sen using $1.5 million from angel investors, and the website bluedot.us was launched in June 2006. Blue Dot hoped to profit on of sales from "dotted" websites from its affiliate marketing program, and was part of the technology resurgence in the Washington Puget Sound area.

Early on, Blue Dot actively sought interaction with early adopters in "pizza and soft drink" focus groups on campus that have been criticized by some academics.

In 2007, the service was renamed Faves. In December 2007, the web site still listed the company name as Blue dot, Inc.

In June 2011, Faves.com, the software, database, and email list was sold to SocialAdr, LLC.

In July 2011, only the domain Faves.com, was sold to Cut Media, LLC.

== See also ==
- List of social bookmarking websites
