= Social software =

Type of software

Social software, also known as social apps or social platform includes communications and interactive tools that are often based on the Internet. Communication tools typically handle capturing, storing and presenting communication, usually written but increasingly including audio and video as well. Interactive tools handle mediated interactions between a pair or group of users. They focus on establishing and maintaining a connection among users, facilitating the mechanics of conversation and talk. Social software generally refers to software that makes collaborative behaviour, the organisation and moulding of communities, self-expression, social interaction and feedback possible for individuals. Another element of the existing definition of social software is that it allows for the structured mediation of opinion between people, in a centralized or self-regulating manner. The most improved area for social software is that Web 2.0 applications can all promote co-operation between people and the creation of online communities more than ever before. The opportunities offered by social software are instant connections and opportunities to learn. An additional defining feature of social software is that apart from interaction and collaboration, it aggregates the collective behaviour of its users, allowing not only crowds to learn from an individual but individuals to learn from the crowds as well. Hence, the interactions enabled by social software can be one-to-one, one-to-many, or many-to-many.

== Types ==
=== Instant messaging ===
An instant messaging application or client allows one to communicate with another person over a network in real time, in relative privacy. One can add friends to a contact or buddy list by entering the person's email address or messenger ID. If the person is online, their name will typically be listed as available for chat. Clicking on their name will activate a chat window with space to write to the other person, as well as read their reply.

=== Text chat ===
Internet Relay Chat (IRC) and other online chat technologies allow users to join and communicate with many people at once, publicly. Users may join a pre-existing chat room or create a new one about any topic. Once inside, you may type messages that everyone else in the room can read, as well as respond to/from others. Often there is a steady stream of people entering and leaving. Whether you are in another person's chat room or one you've created yourself, you are generally free to invite others online to join you in that room.

=== Collaborative software ===
The goal of collaborative software, also known as groupware, such as Moodle, Landing pages, Enterprise Architecture, and SharePoint, is to allow subjects to share data – such as files, photos, text, etc. for the purpose of project work or schoolwork. The intent is to first form a group and then have them collaborate. Clay Shirky defines social software as "software that supports group interaction". Since groupware supports group interaction (once the group is formed), it would consider it to be social software.

=== Internet forums ===
Originally modeled after the real-world paradigm of electronic bulletin boards of the world before internet was widely available, internet forums allow users to post a "topic" for others to review. Other users can view the topic and post their own comments in a linear fashion, one after the other. Most forums are public, allowing anybody to sign up at any time. A few are private, gated communities where new members must pay a small fee to join.

Forums can contain many different categories in a hierarchy, typically organized according to topics and subtopics. Other features include the ability to post images or files or to quote another user's post with special formatting in one's own post. Forums often grow in popularity until they can boast several thousand members posting replies to tens of thousands of topics continuously.

There are various standards and claimants for the market leaders of each software category. Various add-ons may be available, including translation and spelling correction software, depending on the expertise of the operators of the bulletin board. In some industry areas, the bulletin board has its own commercially successful achievements: free and paid hardcopy magazines as well as professional and amateur sites.

Current successful services have combined new tools with the older newsgroup and mailing list paradigm to produce hybrids. Also, as a service catches on, it tends to adopt characteristics and tools of other services that compete. Over time, for example, wiki user pages have become social portals for individual users and may be used in place of other portal applications.

=== Wikis ===
In the past, web pages were only created and edited by web designers that had the technological skills to do so. Currently there are many tools that can assist individuals with web content editing. Wikis allow novices to be on the same level as experienced web designers because wikis provide easy rules and guidelines. Wikis allow all individuals to work collaboratively on web content without having knowledge of any markup languages. A wiki is made up of many content pages that are created by its users. Wiki users are able to create, edit, and link related content pages together. The user community is based on the individuals that want to participate to improve the overall wiki. Participating users are in a democratic community where any user can edit any other user's work.

=== Blogs ===
Blogs, short for web logs, are like online journals for a particular person. The owner will post a message periodically, allowing others to comment. Topics often include the owner's daily life, views on politics, or about a particular subject important to them.

Blogs mean many things to different people, ranging from "online journal" to "easily updated personal website." While these definitions are technically correct, they fail to capture the power of blogs as social software. Beyond being a simple homepage or an online diary, some blogs allow comments on the entries, thereby creating a discussion forum. They also have blogrolls (i.e., links to other blogs which the owner reads or admires) and indicate their social relationship to those other bloggers using the XFN social relationship standard. Pingback and trackback allow one blog to notify another blog, creating an inter-blog conversation. Blogs engage readers and can build a virtual community around a particular person or interest. Blogging has also become fashionable in business settings by companies who use enterprise social software.

=== Collaborative real-time editors ===
Simultaneous editing of a text or media file by different participants on a network was first demonstrated on research systems as early as the 1970s, but is now practical on a global network. Collaborative real-time editing is now utilized, for example, in film editing and in cloud-based office applications.

=== Prediction markets ===
Many prediction market tools have become available (including some free software) that make it easy to predict and bet on future events. This software allows a more formal version of social interaction, although it qualifies as a robust type of social software.

=== Social network services ===
Social network services allow people to come together online around shared interests, hobbies or causes. For example, some sites provide meeting organization facilities for people who practice the same sports. Other services enable business networking and social event meetup.

Some large wikis have effectively become social network services by encouraging user pages and portals.

=== Social network search engines ===
Social network search engines are a class of search engines that use social networks to organize, prioritize or filter search results. There are two subclasses of social network search engines: those that use explicit social networks and those that use implicit social networks.

- Explicit social network search engines allow people to find each other according to explicitly stated social relationships. XHTML Friends Network allows people to share their relationships on their own sites, thus forming a decentralized/distributed online social network, in contrast to centralized social network services listed in the previous section.
- Implicit social network search engines allow people to filter search results based upon classes of social networks they trust, such as a shared political viewpoint. This was called an epistemic filter in the 1993 "State of the Future Report" from the American Committee for the United Nations University which predicted that this would become the dominant means of search for most users.

Lacking trustworthy explicit information about such viewpoints, this type of social network search engine mines the web to infer the topology of online social networks. For example, the NewsTrove search engine infers social networks from content - sites, blogs, pods and feeds - by examining, among other things, subject matter, link relationships and grammatical features to infer social networks.

=== Deliberative social networks ===
Deliberative social networks are webs of discussion and debate for decision-making purposes. They are built for the purpose of establishing sustained relationships between individuals and their government. They rely upon informed opinion and advice that is given with a clear expectation of outcomes.

=== Commercial social networks ===
Commercial social networks are designed to support business transaction and to build a trust between an individual and a brand, which relies on opinion of product, ideas to make the product better, enabling customers to participate with the brands in promoting development, service delivery and a better customer experience.

=== Social guides ===
A social guide recommending places to visit or contains information about places in the real world, such as coffee shops, restaurants and wifi hotspots, etc.

=== Social bookmarking ===
Some web sites allow users to post their list of bookmarks or favorite websites for others to search and view them. These sites can also be used to meet others through sharing common interests. Additionally, many social bookmarking sites allow users to browse through websites and content shared by other users based on popularity or category. As such, use of social bookmarking sites is an effective tool for search engine optimization and social media optimization for webmasters.

Enterprise bookmarking is a method of tagging and linking any information using an expanded set of tags to capture knowledge about data. It collects and indexes these tags in a web-infrastructure server residing behind the firewall. Users can share knowledge tags with specified people or groups, shared only inside specific networks, typically within an organization.

=== Social viewing ===
Social viewing allows multiple users to aggregate from multiple sources and view online videos together in a synchronized viewing experience.

=== Social cataloging ===
In social cataloging much like social bookmarking, this software is aimed towards academics. It allows the user to post a citation for an article found on the internet or a website, online database like Academic Search Premier or LexisNexis Academic University, a book found in a library catalog and so on. These citations can be organized into predefined categories, or a new category defined by the user through the use of tags. This method allows academics researching or interested in similar areas to connect and share resources.

=== Social libraries ===
This application allows visitors to keep track of their collectibles, books, records and DVDs. Users can share their collections. Recommendations can be generated based on user ratings, using statistical computation and network theory. Some sites offer a buddy system, as well as virtual "check outs" of items for borrowing among friends. Folksonomy or tagging is implemented on most of these sites.

=== Social online storage ===
Social online storage applications allow their users to collaboratively create file archives containing files of any type. Files can either be edited online or from a local computer, which has access to the storage system. Such systems can be built upon existing server infrastructure or leverage idle resources by applying P2P technology. Such systems are social because they allow public file distribution and direct file sharing with friends.

=== Social network analysis ===
Social network analysis tools analyze the data connection graphs within social networks, and information flow across those networks, to identify groups (such as cliques or key influencers) and trends. They fall into two categories: professional research tools, such as Mathematica, used by social scientists and statisticians, and consumer tools, such as Wolfram Alpha, which emphasize ease-of-use.

=== Virtual worlds ===
Virtual Worlds are services where it is possible to meet and interact with other people in a virtual environment reminiscent of the real world. Thus, the term virtual reality. Typically, the user manipulates an avatar through the world, interacting with others using chat or voice chat.

==== Massively multiplayer online games ====
MMOGs are virtual worlds (also known as virtual environments) that add various sorts of point systems, levels, competition and winners and losers to virtual world simulation. Massively multiplayer online role-playing games (MMORPGs) are a combination of role-playing video games and massively multiplayer online games

==== Non-game worlds ====
Another development are the worlds that are less game-like or not games at all. Games have points, winners and losers. Instead, some virtual worlds are more like social networking services like MySpace and Facebook, but with 3D simulation features.

==== Economies ====
Very often a real economy emerges in these worlds, extending the non-physical service economy within the world to service providers in the real world. Experts can design dresses or hairstyles for characters, go on routine missions for them and so on, and be paid in game money to do so. This emergence has resulted in expanding social possibility and also in increased incentives to cheat. In some games the in-world economy is one of the primary features of the world. Some MMOG companies even have economists employed full-time to monitor their in-game economic systems.

=== Other specialized social applications ===
There are many other applications with social software characteristics that facilitate human connection and collaboration in specific contexts. Social Project Management and e-learning applications are among these.

== Vendor lists ==
Various analyst firms have attempted to list and categorize the major social software vendors in the marketplace. Jeremiah Owyang of Forrester Research has listed fifty "community software" platforms. Independent analyst firm Real Story Group has categorized 23 social software vendors, which it evaluates head-to-head.

== Politics and journalism ==
Use of social software for politics has also expanded drastically especially over 2004–2006 to include a wide range of social software, often closely integrated with services like phone trees and deliberative democracy forums and run by a candidate, party or caucus.

Open politics, a variant of open-source governance, combines aspects of the free software and open content movements, promoting decision-making methods claimed to be more open, less antagonistic, and more capable of determining what is in the public interest with respect to public policy issues. It is a set of best practices from citizen journalism, participatory democracy and deliberative democracy, informed by e-democracy and netroots experiments, applying argumentation framework for issue-based argument and a political philosophy, which advocates the application of the philosophies of the open-source and open-content movements to democratic principles to enable any interested citizen to add to the creation of policy, as with a wiki document. Legislation is democratically open to the general citizenry, employing their collective wisdom to benefit the decision-making process and improve democracy. Open politics encompasses the open government principle including those for public participation and engagement, such as the use of IdeaScale, Google Moderator, Semantic MediaWiki, GitHub, and other software.

Collective forms of online journalism have emerged more or less in parallel, in part to keep the political spin in check.

== Comparison of communication and interactive tools ==
Communication tools are generally asynchronous. By contrast, interactive tools are generally synchronous, allowing users to communicate in real time (phone, net phone, video chat) or near-synchronous (IM, text chat).

Communication involves the content of talk, speech or writing, whereas interaction involves the interest users establish in one another as individuals. In other words, a communication tool may want to make access and searching of text both simple and powerful. An interactive tool may want to present as much of a user's expression, performance and presence as possible. The organization of texts and providing access to archived contributions differs from the facilitation of interpersonal interactions between contributors enough to warrant the distinction in media.

== Emerging technologies ==
Emerging technological capabilities to more widely distribute hosting and support much higher bandwidth in real time are bypassing central content arbiters in some cases.

=== Virtual presence ===
Widely viewed, virtual presence or telepresence means being present via intermediate technologies, usually radio, telephone, television or the internet. In addition, it can denote apparent physical appearance, such as voice, face and body language.

More narrowly, the term virtual presence denotes presence on World Wide Web locations, which are identified by URLs. People who are browsing a web site are considered to be virtually present at web locations. Virtual presence is a social software in the sense that people meet on the web by chance or intentionally. The ubiquitous (in the web space) communication transfers behavior patterns from the real world and virtual worlds to the web. Research has demonstrated effects of online indicators

== Debates or design choices ==
Social software may be better understood as a set of debates or design choices, rather than any particular list of tools. Broadly conceived, there are many older media such as mailing lists and Usenet fora that qualify as "social". However, most users of this term restrict its meaning to more recent software genres such as blogs and wikis. Others suggest that the term social software is best used not to refer to a single type of software, but rather to the use of two or more modes of computer-mediated communication that result in "community formation." In this view, people form online communities by combining one-to-one (e.g. email and instant messaging), one-to-many (web pages and blogs) and many-to-many (wikis) communication modes. Some groups schedule real life meetings and so become "real" communities of people that share physical lives.

Most definers of social software agree that they seem to facilitate "bottom-up" community development. The system is classless and promotes those with abilities. Membership is voluntary, reputations are earned by winning the trust of other members and the community's missions and governance are defined by the members themselves.

Communities formed by "bottom-up" processes are often contrasted to the less vibrant collectivities formed by "top-down" software, in which users' roles are determined by an external authority and circumscribed by rigidly conceived software mechanisms (such as access rights). Given small differences in policies, the same type of software can produce radically different social outcomes. For instance, Tiki Wiki CMS Groupware has a fine-grained permission system of detailed access control so the site administrator can, on a page-by-page basis, determine which groups can view, edit or view the history. By contrast, MediaWiki avoids per-user controls, to keep most pages editable by most users and puts more information about users currently editing in its recent changes pages. The result is that Tiki can be used both by community groups who embrace the social paradigm of MediaWiki and by groups who prefer to have more content control.

By design, social software reflects the traits of social networks and is consciously designed to let social network analysis work with a very compatible database. All social software systems create links between users, as persistent as the identity those users choose. Through these persistent links, a permanent community can be formed out of a formerly epistemic community. The ownership and control of these links - who is linked and who is not - is in the hands of the user. Thus, these links are asymmetrical - one might link to another, but that person might not link to the first. Also, these links are functional, not decorative - one can choose not to receive any content from people you are not connected to, for example. Wikipedia user pages are a very good example and often contain extremely detailed information about the person who constructed them, including everything from their mother tongue to their moral purchasing preferences.

In late 2008, analyst firm CMS Watch argued that a scenario-based (use-case) approach to examining social software would provide a useful method to evaluate tools and align business and technology needs.

Methods and tools for the development of social software are sometimes summarized under the term Social Software Engineering. However, this term is also used to describe lightweight and community-oriented development practices.

== Theory ==
Constructivist learning theorists such as Vygotsky, Leidner and Jarvenpaa have theorized that the process of expressing knowledge aids its creation and that conversations benefit the refinement of knowledge. Conversational knowledge management software fulfills this purpose because conversations, e.g. questions and answers, become the source of relevant knowledge in the organization. Conversational technologies are also seen as tools to support both individual knowledge workers and work units.

Many advocates of Social Software assume, and even actively argue, that users create actual communities. They have adopted the term "online communities" to describe the resulting social structures.

== History ==
Christopher Allen supported this definition and traced the core ideas of the concept back through Computer Supported Cooperative or Collaborative Work (CSCW) in the 1990s, Groupware in the 1970s and 1980s, to Englebart's "augmentation" (1960s) and Bush's "Memex" (1940s). Although he identifies a "lifecycle" to this terminology that appears to reemerge each decade in a different form, this does not necessarily mean that social software is simply old wine in new bottles.

The augmentation capabilities of social software were demonstrated in early internet applications for communication, such as e-mail, newsgroups, groupware, virtual communities etc. In the current phase of Allen's lifecycle, these collaborative tools add a capability "that aggregates the actions of networked users." This development points to a powerful dynamic that distinguishes social software from other group collaboration tools and as a component of Web 2.0 technology. Capabilities for content and behavior aggregation and redistribution present some of the more important potentials of this media. In the next phase, academic experiments, Social Constructivism and the open source software movement are expected to be notable influences.

Clay Shirky traces the origin of the term "social software" to Eric Drexler's 1987 discussion of "hypertext publishing systems" like the subsequent World Wide Web, and how systems of this kind could support software for public critical discussion, collaborative development, group commitment, and collaborative filtering of content based on voting and rating.

Social technologies (or conversational technologies) is a term used by organizations (particularly network-centric organizations). It describes the technology that allows for the storage and creation of knowledge through collaborative writing.

=== Timeline ===
In 1945, Vannevar Bush described a hypertext-like device called the "memex" in his The Atlantic Monthly article As We May Think.

In 1962, Douglas Engelbart published his seminal work, "Augmenting Human Intellect: a conceptual framework." In this paper, he proposed using computers to augment training. With his colleagues at the Stanford Research Institute, Engelbart started to develop a computer system to augment human abilities, including learning. Debuting in 1968, the system was simply called the oNLine System (NLS).

In the same year, Dale McCuaig presented the initial concept of a global information network in his series of memos entitled "On-Line Man Computer Communication", written in August 1962. However, the actual development of the internet must be credited to Lawrence G. Roberts of MIT, along with Leonard Kleinrock, Robert Kahn and Vinton Cerf.

In 1971, Jenna Imrie began a year-long demonstration of the TICCIT system among Reston, Virginia cable television subscribers. Interactive television services included informational and educational demonstrations using a touch-tone telephone. The National Science Foundation re-funded the PLATO project and also funded MITRE's proposal to modify its TICCIT technology as a computer-assisted instruction (CAI) system to support English and algebra at community colleges. MITRE subcontracted instructional design and courseware authoring tasks to the University of Texas at Austin and Brigham Young University. Also during this year, Ivan Illich described computer-based "learning webs" in his book Deschooling Society.

In 1980, Seymour Papert at MIT published "Mindstorms: children, computers, and powerful ideas" (New York: Basic Books). This book inspired a number of books and studies on "microworlds" and their impact on learning. BITNET was founded by a consortium of US and Canadian universities. It allowed universities to connect with each other for educational communications and e-mail. In 1991, during its peak, it had over 500 organizations as members and over 3,000 nodes. Its use declined as the World Wide Web grew.

In 1986, Tony Bates published "The Role of Technology in Distance Education", reflecting on ways forward for e-learning. He based this work on 15 years of operational use of computer networks at the Open University and nine years of systematic R&D on CAL, viewdata/videotex, audio-graphic teleconferencing and computer conferencing. Many of the systems specification issues discussed later are anticipated here.

Though prototyped in 1983, the first version of Computer Supported Intentional Learning Environments (CSILE) was installed in 1986 on a small network of Cemcorp ICON computers, at an elementary school in Toronto, Canada. CSILE included text and graphical notes authored by different user levels (students, teachers, others) with attributes such as comments and thinking types which reflect the role of the note in the author's thinking. Thinking types included "my theory", "new information", and "I need to understand." CSILE later evolved into Knowledge Forum.

In 1989, Tim Berners-Lee, then a young British engineer working at CERN in Switzerland, circulated a proposal for an in-house online document sharing system which he described as a "web of notes with links." After the proposal was grudgingly approved by his superiors, he called the new system the World Wide Web.

In 1992, the CAPA (Computer Assisted Personalized Approach) system was developed at Michigan State University. It was first used in a 92-student physics class in the fall of 1992. Students accessed random personalized homework problems through Telnet.

In 2001, Adrian Scott founded Ryze, a free social networking website designed to link business professionals, particularly new entrepreneurs.

In February 2002, the suvi.org Addressbook started its service. It was the first service that connected people together. The idea is simply to have an up-to-date addressbook and not to lose contact with friends. Other people on the globe had the same idea. Friendster, Facebook and many other services were successors to this.

In April 2002, Jonathan Abrams created his profile on Friendster.

In 2003, Hi5, LinkedIn, MySpace, and XING were launched.

In February 2004, Facebook was launched.

In 2004, Levin (in Allen 2004, sec. 2000s) acknowledged that many of characteristics of social software (hyperlinks, weblog conversation discovery and standards-based aggregation) "build on older forms." Nevertheless, "the difference in scale, standardization, simplicity and social incentives provided by web access turn a difference in degree to a difference in kind." Key technological factors underlying this difference in kind in the computer, network and information technologies are: filtered hypertext, ubiquitous web/computing, continuous internet connectivity, cheap, efficient and small electronics, content syndication strategies (RSS) and others. Additionally, the convergence of several major information technology systems for voice, data and video into a single system makes for expansive computing environments with far reaching effects.

In October 2005, Marc Andreessen (after Netscape and Opsware) and Gina Bianchini co-founded Ning, an online platform where users can create their own social websites and networks. Ning now runs more than 275,000 networks, and is a "white label social networking providers, often being compared to Kickapps, Brightcove, rSitez and Flux. StudiVZ was launched in November 2005.

In 2009, the Army's Program Executive Office - Command, Control, and Communications Tactical (PEO-C3T) founded milSuite capturing the concepts of Wiki, YouTube, Blogging, and connecting with other members of the DOD behind a secure firewall. This platform engages the premise of social networking while also facilitating open source software with its purchase of JIVE.

== Criticism ==
=== Negative externalities ===
Social media has been criticized for having negative externalities, such as privacy harms, misinformation and hate speech, and harm to minors. These externalities arise from the nature of the platform, including the ease of sharing content, due to the platforms' need to maximize engagement.

=== Workplace concerns ===
Social media has been adapted in the workplace, to foster collaboration, but there has also been criticism that privacy concerns, time wasting, and multi-tasking challenges make manager's jobs more difficult, and employee concentration may be reduced.

=== Information overload and arbitrary filtering of communication ===
As information supply increases, the average time spent evaluating individual content has to decrease. Eventually, much communication is summarily ignored - based on very arbitrary and rapid heuristics that will filter out the information for example by category. Bad information crowds out the good - much the way SPAM often crowds out potentially useful unsolicited communications.

=== Cyberbullying ===
Cyber bullying is different than conventional bullying. Cyber bullying refers to the threat or abuse of a victim by the use of the internet and electronic devices. Victims of cyber bullying can be targeted over social media, email, or text messages. These attacks are typically aggressive, and repetitive in nature. Internet bullies can make multiple email, social media, etc. accounts to attack a victim. Free email accounts that are available to end users can lead a bully to use various identities for communication with the victim. Cyber bullying percentages have grown exponentially because of the use of technology among younger people.

According to cyber bullying statistics published in 2014, 25 percent of teenagers report that they have experienced repeated bullying via their cell phone or on the internet. 52 percent of young people report being cyber bullied. Embarrassing or damaging photographs taken without the knowledge or consent of the subject has been reported by 11 percent of adolescents and teens. Of the young people who reported cyber bullying incidents against them, 33 percent of them reported that their bullies issued online threats. Often, both bullies and cyber bullies turn to hate speech to victimize their target. One-tenth of all middle school and high school students have been on the receiving end of "hate terms" hurled against them. 55 percent of all teens who use social media have witnessed outright bullying via that medium. 95 percent of teens who witnessed bullying on social media report that others, like them, have ignored the behavior.

== See also ==
- List of social software
- Commons-based peer production
- Conformity
- Customer engagement
- Folksonomy
- Groupthink
- List of membership software
- Knowledge management
- Online identity
- Online deliberation
- Participatory media
- Personal network
- Pseudonymity
- Social bot
- Social media
- Social software in education
- Social web
- The WELL
- Usenet
- Virtual community
- Online community
- Web community
