= Pearltrees =

Website

- Available in: English / French
- Owners: Broceliand, S.A.S.
- Creators: Patrice Lamothe, Francois Rocaboy, Alain Cohen, Samuel Tissier and Nicolas Cynober
- Website: pearltrees.com
- Registration: Required for full functionality
- Launched: Public Alpha March, 2009 Open Beta, December 2009
- Current status: Open beta

Pearltrees is a visual and collaborative curation tool that allows users to organize, explore and share any URL they find online as well as to upload personal photos, files and notes. The product features a visual interface that allows users to drag and organize collected URLs, and other digital objects that themselves can be further organized into collections and sub-collections,(URLs). Users of the product can also engage in social/collaborative curation using a feature called Pearltrees Teams.

Pearltrees claims to be among the first companies to provide an exposed interest graph. The company's mission is to help users "Democratize Organization of Knowledge". As part of the product's social features, Pearltrees users can synchronize their accounts with both Twitter and Facebook. This bi-directional functionality supports the collection of new pearls each time a link is shared or tweeted.

New links added to user accounts and new collections created by users can also be broadcast via a user's Twitter and Facebook accounts if users have enabled this feature. Users can also embed a collection into most CMS products including WordPress blogs, Drupal websites, Typepad blogs and others.

Pearltrees was founded by Patrice Lamothe, CEO, Alain Cohen, CTO, Nicolas Cynober, Technical Director, Samuel Tissier, Ergonomy/UI and Francois Rocaboy, CMO.

== History ==
Development of Pearltrees began in 2007.

An alpha was launched in March 2009 and made its first significant public appearance (in open beta) at LeWeb in December 2009.

CEO and Founder Patrice Lamothe laid out the rationalization for this company in his blog post, "The Web's Third Frontier", where he proposed that the next logical phase of the Internet was the democratization of the organization of the web, after the successive events of the access to content and the democratization of content creation.

At the 2010 Web2.0 Expo in San Francisco, Pearltrees introduced the ability to "super-embed" a pearltree into another website. Pearltrees embedded in other sites are updated dynamically, whenever the original pearltree changes on the Pearltrees website.

In December 2010, Pearltrees made their initial foray into collaborative curation with the launch of a new "team" feature. The team feature lets users of the product ask to team-up on pearltrees that have already been curated by other users. Once added to a team, these additional curators can then add, remove and reorganize the content of that and any sub-pearltrees, and can add new members to the team.

In October 2011, Pearltrees introduced the app for iPad. The product was well received by a number of technology bloggers including Marshall Kirkpatrick of ReadWriteWeb and Martin Bryant of TheNextWeb As of May 2012, Pearltrees for iPad had maintained an overall 4.5 star rating in Apple's iPad App Store.

In July 2012, Pearltrees launched their iPhone app. Like its predecessor product for the iPad, the app was well received by the media and also received praise from users. As a result, the application enjoyed a 4.5 star rating in Apple's App Store. In addition to curating links, Pearltrees 0.9.3 version also let contributors add photos and notes to their accounts. The product also featured an "offline mode" that supported the browsing of all collected content, whether the phone was connected to a network or not.

On October 31, 2012, Pearltrees simultaneously launched a 1.0 version and a premium membership product called Pearltrees Premium. The 1.0 version of Pearltrees featured several upgrades to the web interface, most visibly to the way content was displayed; a new format the company called "the big pearl window". Better congruence of the application across platforms is another stated improvement of the Pearltrees 1.0 experience. The launch of Pearltrees Premium was the company's first effort to monetize their product. Premium account users can keep all or a portion of an account completely private, or share it only with a few selected collaborators. Premium accounts can also be protected with a PIN on iOS devices.

The company released their first Android version of Pearltrees on July 9, 2013. As of September 2013, this app let users collect, organize, share and discover content from 98.6% of the then-current Android platform (every version except Eclair), and the app ran on approximately 2,500 of the 3,400 devices that use the Android OS. The Android version also used the share-intents capability built into the Android platform, allowing users to create pearls from content within other Android apps. The app was named an app of the week by Gizmodo, the same week the product launched.

Support for uploading and accessing files from any device was added to the product in an update released on the web and the GooglePlayStore on November 21, 2013. This version of Pearltrees let users upload personal files of any type and organize them in conjunction with URLs, notes and photos. The update also added file storage limits specific to each of four account types as follows: Free accounts have 250 MB of storage, Personal accounts 5 GB, Advanced accounts 25 GB and Professional accounts 100 GB.

Pearltrees introduced Pearltrees 2.0 on May 22, 2014. The 2.0 version of Pearltrees featured a new interface the company called the "dynamic grid". The company also announced their move away from Flash to HTML 5 and major updates to the company's iOS and Android apps. The revised product featured extended drag-and-drop capabilities, as well as new options to share content including to Reddit, Tumblr and LinkedIn, in addition to the product's existing sharing capabilities to Twitter, Facebook and via email and embeds.

== Usage ==
Pearltrees allows registered contributors to add different media types such as: web pages, photos, notes, files and even snippets of other web pages to their accounts in the following ways:

- Dragging and dropping items from the desktop or from another web page directly into the browser tab where Pearltrees is open
- Using the "add" dialog and pasting the URL, or uploading the photo, note or file
- With the Pearltrees browser extension (also called an "add-on") (Pearltrees has specific extensions for Chrome, Firefox, and Internet Explorer and a bookmarklet that functions on several browsers)
- Via Twitter and Facebook by using Pearltrees' "sync" feature to connect with other social services
- Users of Pearltrees' apps for iPad, iPhone and Android can capture URLs using a bookmarklet or by entering the URL directly into a dialog box within the app itself.

Pearltrees Teams allows users to curate collaboratively.

Pearltrees claims to have created one of the first exposed interest graphs on the web. In the "discovery mode", a user is presented with a cluster of pearltrees that the company claims are closely related to the central Pearltree by virtue of commonalities between their respective accounts. As the screen is dragged with the mouse or finger, more pearltrees will appear. The further out one navigates from the original central pearltree, the further away from the original topic become the pearltrees that begin to appear. As an example, should a central pearl in discovery mode be autism, adjacent pearls would likely be ADHD, Asperger's, dyslexia, etc., while pearltrees potentially found somewhat further from the center might include those on cancer, behavior, psychology and more.

=== Privacy ===
Within the Pearltrees product, every link collected in every account is fully public. However, the company said in 2011 that it plans to introduce granular privacy features.

Privacy features were added to the product in October 2012 as part of a premium feature-set. The premium product allows users to create private pearltrees as well as private teams. Users with premium accounts can share their private pearltrees with other non-premium members.

== Business ==
Pearltree secured $12.2 million in angel and venture funding in 4 separate rounds: The company received an initial one million Euro investment from friends, family and angel investors in June 2008. This was followed by a second, larger angel round of €1.5M in June 2009. The company secured an additional €1.3M in angel funding in June 2010 and raised a substantial A-round of $6.6 million (USD) in January 2012.

=== Investors ===
The company has generally revealed little about its sources of funding and has never sought or received investment from typical venture funds or any US investors. To date, only two investors or investment groups have been named as having contributed capital to the startup, Pierre Kosciusko Morizet and Group Accueil.

=== Awards ===
In 2010 Pearltrees was one of six companies to participate in the Web 2.0 Expo Launchpad competition. The company was also called "A Leap Forward" by OSEO.

=== Browser Extensions ===
- Pearltrees "Pearler" for Google Chrome, Mozilla Firefox, Apple's Safari, Microsoft Internet Explorer supports the collection of content directly from the browser. The pearler enables placement of a link directly into the account of the user. Function varies depending upon the browser, but generally allows: collection of links into the product's "drop-zone", a temporary storage for links not yet placed into a specific location within a user's account, placement of links to a specified folder or sub-folder within an account, creation of new folders and sub-folders, and navigation directly to the root of an account or a particular location within an account. The iOS version of the product requires the installation of a bookmarklet.

== See also ==
- List of social bookmarking websites
