= Trackle =

Trackle was an online service that enabled users to track what they cared about on the web in one central place. Trackle offered a variety of information categories that users could keep tabs on and share like-interests with groups of users via Twitter, SMS and Email.

As of 2013, the domain name redirects to a different company founded by the same person.

== What it did ==
Trackle notified its users whenever there was some new information on topics of their interest. Following are some of the categories users could register to get notifications (a.k.a. "alerts"):

- Local information specific to a user's neighborhood or city
  - Any new crime reported in a user's neighborhood recently
  - Local events and news
  - Recent home price fluctuations
- Social events relating to a user's friends and groups
  - New job leads with matching criteria
  - Birthdays and special occasions
- Shopping
  - New classifieds listings on Craigslist
  - Price drops on desired products
  - Product availability
- Sports
  - Major league sports scores (NFL, NBA, NHL, MLB)
  - NCAA football and basketball
  - Ski conditions

== How it worked ==
Trackle defined search agents called "Tracklets" to store settings for a particular type of search. Users could set up Tracklets for categories of interest and personalize the Tracklets by entering appropriate information, for example, zip code for weather alert, actor name for upcoming movie releases, and product details for tracking price drops. Trackle alert platform was linked to RSS feeds from various content providers. Trackle ran the personalized searches periodically in the background and got the requested content. It generated alerts whenever it found a new match and provided automatic notifications over the web, email or SMS based on the Tracklet configuration. Trackle offered a "preview" feature to enable users to refine their custom parameters before setting up a Tracklet for a new category. Users could lookup Tracklets being used by any of their friends as long as they had marked them marked as 'public'.

== Company ==
Trackle was founded by Pavan Nigam, a Silicon Valley–based entrepreneur, who co-founded Healtheon, and was founder/CEO of Cendura, later acquired by Computer Associates; and Naveen Saxena, a seasoned technology executive who has held senior positions at Cisco, Healtheon and Fidelity. Trackle was funded by NEA (New Enterprise Associates) and angel investors. Trackle was a privately held company based in Sunnyvale, California.
