= Connotea =

Online reference management service

- Developer(s): Nature Publishing Group
- Stable release: 1.8 (no longer live)
- Written in: Perl
- Platform: Web-based
- Available in: English
- Type: Bibliography manager
- License: GNU General Public License version 2+
- Website: connotea.org

Connotea was a free online reference management service for scientists, researchers, and clinicians, created in December 2004 by Nature Publishing Group and discontinued in March 2013. It was one of a breed of social bookmarking tools, similar to CiteULike and del.icio.us, where users can save links to their favourite websites. ReadCube is a similar free service that offers storage, annotation and sharing tools specifically for scientific documents.

Connotea was aimed primarily at scientists (though the user community included other academic disciplines), and while users could bookmark any webpage they chose, it incorporated special functionality for certain academic resources. Connotea recognised a number of scientific websites and automatically collected metadata for the article or page being bookmarked, including author and publication names. It was also possible to add non-recognised webpages by manually entering information. An alternative method of adding an article was to retrieve the Connotea form and add the Digital Object Identifier (DOI) for the article. Information about the material was retrieved automatically using CrossRef, the official DOI registration point. This function meant that it was possible to quickly retrieve the reference for a print article that had an electronic counterpart with a DOI.

When saving an article to Connotea, users "tagged" the article with keywords of their choice which they could later use to find it again. By categorising articles with relevant keywords e.g. "C. elegans", the social aspect of Connotea was developed. The system recognised users who were bookmarking the same papers or using the same keywords, and alerted them to potentially-related material. Allowing completely free tagging means a folksonomy can gradually develop. By default, links posted to Connotea were publicly viewable, allowing network effects to build up rapidly, but it was also possible for users to keep selected links private, either indefinitely or until a specified date and time. Connotea also provided RSS feeds, allowing users to keep track of articles posted under interesting tags or by users with similar interests.

Connotea had the capacity to export the references in RIS format to a citation manager program. This meant that it was possible to save references when working on a computer without such bibliographic software installed and import them into this software for citing at a later stage.

In September 2005, Connotea won the Association of Learned and Professional Society Publishers Award for Publishing Innovation, and in November 2005 was shortlisted for the International Information Industry awards in the Best Scientific, Technical and Medical (STM) Product category.

Connotea discontinued service on March 12, 2013. An export tool remained live until April 16, 2013 so that registered users could export their bookmarks.

== See also ==
- Comparison of reference management software
