= Xmarks Sync =

Browser bookmark synchronizer

Xmarks
- Developers: Marvasol, Inc. (LogMeIn)
- Release: 2006; 20 years ago
- Stable release: Firefox: 4.5.0.8 (February 4, 2018; 8 years ago) [±] IE: 1.3.17 (September 26, 2016; 10 years ago) [±] Safari: 2.0.19 (March 12, 2015; 11 years ago) [±] Chrome: 1.0.33 (July 25, 2017; 9 years ago) [±]
- Platform: Internet Explorer, Google Chrome, Mozilla Firefox and Safari
- Type: Browser synchronizer and browser extension
- License: Freeware

Xmarks, formerly Foxmarks, is a defunct bookmark synchronization add-on for web browsers. The add-on was developed by San Francisco-based company Foxmarks (later renamed Xmarks) which was founded in 2006 by Mitch Kapor and was acquired by LastPass in December 2010.

LastPass announced on March 30, 2018, that the Xmarks service would be shut down on May 1, 2018.

== Overview ==
The Xmarks bookmark synchronizer was an extension for Mozilla Firefox, Internet Explorer, Google Chrome and Apple Safari (on OS X 10.5 and 10.6) that synchronized bookmarks between computers. It could also synchronize passwords, open tabs, and browsing history (Firefox only). Opera support has not been directly implemented as of 2015 but the Chrome extension is available in Opera via a workaround. As of April 2009 it was one of the most popular Firefox add-ons, attaining over 150,000 downloads per week and almost 15 million total downloads.

== History ==
In March 2009, Foxmarks was relaunched under a new name and service called Xmarks. Xmarks included many new features like suggested tagging bookmarks.

On September 27, 2010 it was announced that due to the company's current financial projections resulting from its purely voluntary-donations funding-basis, in January 2011, Xmarks would be entirely discontinuing its service. On September 30, Xmarks CEO, James Joaquin, noted that he had been "pleasantly surprised by the volume of interest" that has been expressed since his initial "closing-announcement". This interest has been shown by both potential buyers of the company, and by those who have thus far pledged to subscribe to the service at the site's "pledge page". At their donations page, Xmarks attempted to acquire pledges from 100,000 of their users to pay $10–20 per year for a proposed "premium Xmarks service" which launched on December 9, 2010. To the date October 7, 2010, Xmarks investors had invested $9 million into the Xmarks project, but with a return on this investment not yet clearly in sight, unless sufficient pledges are received by October 15, 2010, apparently these initial investment funds are reaching an end-point.

On December 2, 2010, the password-management service LastPass acquired Xmarks. Since this acquisition the program has been minimally updated, primarily fixing bugs, and has not had a single new feature added. On October 9, 2015, LastPass was acquired by LogMeIn, Inc. for $125 million. After the acquisition, LastPass stated that they plan to continue to support Xmarks.

On March 30, 2018, in an email to users, LastPass announced that the Xmarks service would be shut down on May 1, 2018.

=== Xmarks domain blockage in India ===
Starting in May 2012, the xmarks.com domain was blocked by major ISPs in India by court order, resulting in various websites appearing with only a simple message "Access to this site has been blocked as per Court Orders."

== Privacy ==
Xmarks provided an option to encrypt bookmarks while they are in transit between the browser and the Xmarks server. Individual users' bookmarks are kept private from other users. However, there are clearly issues of privacy and trust in sending bookmarks to a third party. Xmarks did provide an option for the user to avoid the Xmarks server, by using their own WebDAV or FTP server to store their bookmarks, but this option was only available with Firefox.

Bookmarks were analysed to provide public services such as "Suggested Tags" and "Smarter Search" (Xmarks enhancements to Google web search). The privacy policy stated that the results of this analysis are published without providing any information about individual users.
