= Putfile =

Free file hosting service, 2004 to 2009

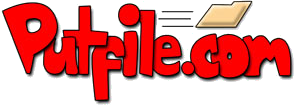
- Website type: Video sharing
- Available in: multilingual
- Founded: January 2004
- Headquarters: San Francisco, California, U.S.
- Owners: ZVUE Corporation (Formerly HandHeld Entertainment Inc.)
- Key people: Gordon Page, Founder
- Revenue: Advertising (e.g. Google Ads)
- Website: (defunct)
- Registration: Optional (required to upload)
- Launched: January 2004
- Current status: defunct

Putfile was a free file hosting service started in January 2004 that provided video and photo hosting services. It was originally owned by Putfile Limited in Godalming, Surrey, England, and on February 6, 2007, it was purchased by ZVUE Corporation, an internet media company.

== Uploading ==
Putfile accepted files in most common video, music, audio, and image formats. There was a 5 MB image size limit. File size maximums for videos and Flash files were repeatedly increased; as of July 2007, the maximum file size was 200MB.

Media could be rated on a scale from 1 (worst) to 5 (best). Statistics were kept on the number of views a file had and its average rating. The site provided links to the highest rated and most viewed media.

Registration was free. As of December 2005, text ads were being sold on Putfile.

== Viewing media ==
The photo upload tool allowed users to upload multiple photos at once with an easy-to-use thumbnail preview mode. Once photos for upload were selected they were automatically resized and then uploaded to albums of the user's choosing. Motion in GIF format images tended to be dysfunctional.

Putfile prohibited the uploading of pornographic or offensive material.

As of 14 October 2008 the site stopped allowing new uploads or new users.

On April 23, 2009, Putfile went offline.
