= KartMe =

- Website type: Social cataloging, social networking
- Available in: English
- Creator: Phil Michaelson
- Website: http://kartme.com/
- Registration: Optional
- Launched: September 1, 2009
- Current status: Active

KartMe is a social networking website and mobile application that specializes in social cataloging. Members organize and share favorite links, products and places in lists called "Karts". The mobile application was an Apple "Staff Pick". The full service has been called a beauty lifesaver, a step beyond bookmarking and useful for home design projects.

KartMe was started by Phil Michaelson with a Rock and Lebor Fellowship from Harvard Business School.
