= Social network aggregation =

Aggregation of web content

Social network aggregation is the process of collecting content from multiple social network services into a unified presentation. Examples of social network aggregators include Hootsuite or FriendFeed, which may pull together information into a single location or help a user consolidate multiple social networking profiles into a single profile.

Various aggregation services provide tools or widgets to allow users to consolidate messages, track friends, combine bookmarks, search across multiple social networking sites, read RSS feeds for numerous social networks, see when their name is mentioned on various sites, access their profiles from a single interface, and provide "live streams", among other things. Social network aggregation services attempt to organize or simplify a user's social networking experience, although the concept of a "social network aggregator aggregator" satirizes this idea.

Some aggregators perform other duties; for example, some aim to help companies and individuals improve engagement with their brands. Creating aggregated social streams that can be embedded into an existing website and customized to look visually intrinsic to the site allows potential customers to interact with all the social media posts maintained by the brand without moving between websites, which can keep customers loyal to the brand for longer.

== Function ==
Social network aggregation platforms allow members to share social network activity on their accounts with major platforms, including Twitter, YouTube, StumbleUpon, Digg, and Delicious. Content appears in real-time to other members who subscribe to a particular community, eliminating the need to jump from one social media network to another and streamlining the process of updating multiple social media platforms.

Social network aggregation systems can rely on initiation by publishers or engagement through their readers. In publisher-initiated aggregation systems, publishers combine identities, allowing their readers to see all aggregated content once they subscribe. In reader-initiated systems, such as Windows Phone 7 People Hub and Linked Internet UI, readers combine identities without impacting publishers or other readers; publishers can retain separate identities for different readers.

Technically, APIs provided by social networks enable aggregation. For the API to access a user's actions from another platform, the user must permit the social-aggregation platform by specifying the user ID and password of the social media account to be syndicated. In March 2008, The Economist reported that social networking services are beginning to move away from "walled gardens" towards more open architecture. Some sites work together on a "data portability work group," while others focus on a single sign-on system called OpenID to allow users to log on across multiple sites. Historically, the trend from private services to more open ones is evident across many Internet services, including email and instant messaging. This trend is also apparent in the change from online service providers to websites. The OpenSocial initiative aims to bridge the member overlap between various online social network services.

Social network aggregators such as FriendFeed represent connections between people with directed graphs. They adopt a following approach, rather than a friending one, where "A follows B" does not imply "B follows A"; in other words, following is not reciprocal. In this scenario, nodes represent each account, and edges illustrate the following relationship. The relationships between these nodes are linked to their age and sphere of influence; that is, nodes that have joined the network more recently receive less influence than older ones. Therefore, on social network aggregators, new nodes tend to connect to nodes with high degrees.

== History ==
Media aggregators predate social media. For example, journalists summarize numerous pieces of information and try to synthesize relevant content from many sources. This practice serves a dual purpose: it provides understandable information about complex topics and eliminates the time requirement for readers to find and analyze news from multiple sources. Moreover, job listings and other advertisements have also used aggregators.

== Data collection ==
Performing social network aggregation requires a large range of data, including content related to a topic and information about profiles reached by the content. Social network aggregators then analyze this data, correlating the audience profiles and the type of content. However, collecting such data may be difficult, as databases of social networks vary and may change during some updates.

== Applications in marketing ==
Social network aggregators are a powerful tool in marketing as an efficient way to view content and better understand the market. A study provided by eMarketer noted that 43% of marketers complain about a significant lack of time to find relevant content for their business. Social network aggregators contain features to share content on social media platforms and reach as many people as possible, acting as a productivity enhancement tool.

== Overlap between multiple social network services ==
The attraction of social network aggregation comes from the fact that some users have accounts on several social networking sites. In November 2007, Alex Patriquin of Compete.com reported on the member overlap between various online social network services:

Site	Bebo	Facebook	Friendster	Hi5	LinkedIn	MySpace	Ning	Orkut	Plaxo
Bebo		25%	2%	3%	1%	65%	1%	0%	0%
Facebook	4%		2%	2%	2%	64%	1%	1%	9%
Friendster	5%	23%		4%	6%	49%	2%	1%	0%
Hi5	7%	24%	4%		1%	69%	0%	2%	0%
LinkedIn	4%	42%	8%	2%		32%	8%	3%	3%
MySpace	3%	20%	1%	1%	0%		0%	0%	0%
Ning	6%	35%	6%	1%	19%	44%		2%	2%
Orkut	3%	26%	4%	7%	8%	29%	2%		1%
Plaxo	5%	48%	8%	2%	54%	34%	14%	4%	

A study conducted in 2009 of 11,000 users reported that the majority of MySpace, LinkedIn, and Twitter users also have Facebook accounts.

== See also ==
- Content moderation
- Crowdmapping
- List of social networking services
- Social media
- Social network
- Social network consolidator
- Social networking service
- Web 2.0
- Social bookmarking
