= Diigo =

Social bookmarking website

- Website type: Social Annotations, Highlighting and Social Bookmarking
- Website: www.diigo.com
- Commercial: Yes
- Launched: July 4, 2006
- Current status: Active

Diigo /ˈdiːɡoʊ/ is a social bookmarking website that allows signed-up users to bookmark and tag Web pages. Additionally, it allows users to highlight any part of a webpage and attach sticky notes to specific highlights or to a whole page. These annotations can be kept private, shared with a group within Diigo, or be forwarded to someone else via a special link. The name "Diigo" is an acronym from "Digest of Internet Information, Groups and Other stuff".

Premium account holders can perform full-text searches of cached copies of bookmarks. A full-text search also searches page URLs, tags and annotations. This means that premium account holders can choose to omit tags that already appear in the text of a page to be bookmarked (although text inside images cannot be searched).

The launch of Diigo met with mixed responses, from the unimpressed to the enthusiastic. Diigo beta was listed as one of the top ten research tools by CNET in 2006.

Outside the website, Diigo's graphical user interface includes an optional bookmarklet, or a customizable toolbar, with various search capabilities. Highlight is enabled by a menu, that can either appear automatically when content is selected, or be embedded into the context menu.

In March 2009, Diigo acquired web-clipping service Furl from Looksmart for an undisclosed price.

Diigo offers a browser extension, Diigo Web Collector, for Google Chrome and Firefox.

On October 25, 2012, the diigo.com domain was hijacked. An unknown attacker changed the authoritative nameserver records ("NS records") for DNS zone DIIGO.COM, temporarily giving control to nameservers at AFRAID.ORG, and causing traffic to be misdirected.

A mobile app, Diigo Browser, is available for iOS. Diigo previously also offered apps for Android and Windows Phone 7, but these are no longer available. The Android app was available on Google Play from 2010 until it was unpublished in February 2024.
