= Folksonomy =

Classification based on users' tags

Folksonomy (also known as collaborative tagging, social classification, social indexing, social tagging) is a classification system in which end users apply public tags to online items, typically to make those items easier for themselves or others to find later. Over time, this can give rise to a classification system based on those tags and how often they are applied or searched for, in contrast to a taxonomic classification designed by the owners of the content and specified when it is published. Folksonomy was originally "the result of personal free tagging of information [...] for one's own retrieval", but online sharing and interaction expanded it into more collaborative forms. Social tagging is the application of tags in an open online environment where the tags of other users are available to others. Collaborative tagging, also known as group tagging, is a form of tagging that is performed by a group of users. This type of folksonomy is commonly used in cooperative and collaborative projects, including research, content repositories, and social bookmarking.

The term was coined by Thomas Vander Wal in 2004 as a portmanteau of folk and taxonomy. Folksonomies became popular as part of social software applications such as social bookmarking and photograph annotation that enable users to collectively classify and find information via shared tags. Some websites include tag clouds as a way to visualize tags in a folksonomy.

Folksonomies can be used for K–12 education, business, and higher education. More specifically, folksonomies may be implemented for social bookmarking, teacher resource repositories, e-learning systems, collaborative learning, collaborative research, professional development and teaching. Wikipedia has been called an example of folksonomy.

== Benefits and disadvantages ==
Folksonomies are a trade-off between traditional centralized classification and no classification at all, and have several advantages:

- Tagging is easy to understand and do, even without training and previous knowledge in classification or indexing
- The vocabulary in a folksonomy directly reflects the user's vocabulary
- Folksonomies are flexible, in the sense that the user can add or remove tags
- Tags consist of both popular content and long-tail content, enabling users to browse and discover new content even in narrow topics
- Tags reflect the user's conceptual model without cultural, social, or political bias
- Enable the creation of communities, in the sense that users who apply the same tag have a common interest
- Folksonomies are multi-dimensional, in the sense that users can assign any number and combination of tags to express a concept

There are several disadvantages with the use of tags and folksonomies as well, and some of the advantages can lead to problems. For example, the simplicity in tagging can result in poorly applied tags. Further, while controlled vocabularies are exclusionary by nature, tags are often ambiguous and overly personalized. Users apply tags to documents in many different ways and tagging systems also often lack mechanisms for handling synonyms, acronyms and homonyms, and they also often lack mechanisms for handling spelling variations such as misspellings, singular/plural form, conjugated and compound words. Some tagging systems do not support tags consisting of multiple words, resulting in tags like "viewfrommywindow". Sometimes users choose specialized tags or tags without meaning to others.

== Elements and types ==
A folksonomy emerges when users tag content or information, such as web pages, photos, videos, podcasts, tweets, scientific papers and others. Strohmaier et al. elaborate the concept: the term "tagging" refers to a "voluntary activity of users who are annotating resources with term-so-called 'tags' – freely chosen from an unbounded and uncontrolled vocabulary". Others explain tags as an unstructured textual label or keywords, and that they appear as a simple form of metadata.

Folksonomies consist of three basic entities: users, tags, and resources. Users create tags to mark resources such as: web pages, photos, videos, and podcasts. These tags are used to manage, categorize and summarize online content. This collaborative tagging system also uses these tags as a way to index information, facilitate searches and navigate resources. Folksonomy also includes a set of URLs that are used to identify resources that have been referred to by users of different websites. These systems also include category schemes that have the ability to organize tags at different levels of granularity.

Vander Wal identifies two types of folksonomy: broad and narrow. A broad folksonomy arises when multiple users can apply the same tag to an item, providing information about which tags are the most popular. A narrow folksonomy occurs when users, typically fewer in number and often including the item's creator, tag an item with tags that can each be applied only once. While both broad and narrow folksonomies enable the searchability of content by adding an associated word or phrase to an object, a broad folksonomy allows for sorting based on the popularity of each tag, as well as the tracking of emerging trends in tag usage and developing vocabularies.

An example of a broad folksonomy is del.icio.us, a website where users can tag any online resource they find relevant with their own personal tags. The photo-sharing website Flickr is an oft-cited example of a narrow folksonomy.

== Folksonomy versus taxonomy ==
'Taxonomy' refers to a hierarchical categorization in which relatively well-defined classes are nested under broader categories. A folksonomy establishes categories (each tag is a category) without stipulating or necessarily deriving a hierarchical structure of parent-child relations among different tags. (Work has been done on techniques for deriving at least loose hierarchies from clusters of tags.)

Supporters of folksonomies claim that they are often preferable to taxonomies because folksonomies democratize the way information is organized, they are more useful to users because they reflect current ways of thinking about domains, and they express more information about domains. Critics claim that folksonomies are messy and thus harder to use, and can reflect transient trends that may misrepresent what is known about a field.

An empirical analysis of the complex dynamics of tagging systems, published in 2007, has shown that consensus around stable distributions and shared vocabularies does emerge, even in the absence of a central controlled vocabulary. For content to be searchable, it should be categorized and grouped. While this was believed to require commonly agreed on sets of content describing tags (much like keywords of a journal article), some research has found that in large folksonomies common structures also emerge on the level of categorizations. Accordingly, it is possible to devise mathematical models of collaborative tagging that allow for translating from personal tag vocabularies (personomies) to the vocabulary shared by most users.

Folksonomy is unrelated to folk taxonomy, a cultural practice that has been widely documented in anthropological and folkloristic work. Folk taxonomies are culturally supplied, intergenerationally transmitted, and relatively stable classification systems that people in a given culture use to make sense of the entire world around them (not just the Internet).

The study of the structuring or classification of folksonomy is termed folksontology. This branch of ontology deals with the intersection between highly structured taxonomies or hierarchies and loosely structured folksonomy, asking what best features can be taken by both for a system of classification. The strength of flat-tagging schemes is their ability to relate one item to others like it. Folksonomy allows large disparate groups of users to collaboratively label massive, dynamic information systems. The strength of taxonomies are their browsability: users can easily start from more generalized knowledge and target their queries towards more specific and detailed knowledge. Folksonomy looks to categorize tags and thus create browsable spaces of information that are easy to maintain and expand.

== Social tagging for knowledge acquisition ==
Social tagging for knowledge acquisition is the specific use of tagging for finding and re-finding specific content for an individual or group. Social tagging systems differ from traditional taxonomies in that they are community-based systems lacking the traditional hierarchy of taxonomies. Rather than a top-down approach, social tagging relies on users to create the folksonomy from the bottom up.

Common uses of social tagging for knowledge acquisition include personal development for individual use and collaborative projects. Social tagging is used for knowledge acquisition in secondary, post-secondary, and graduate education as well as personal and business research. The benefits of finding/re-finding source information are applicable to a wide spectrum of users. Tagged resources are located through search queries rather than searching through a more traditional file folder system. The social aspect of tagging also allows users to take advantage of metadata from thousands of other users.

Users choose individual tags for stored resources. These tags reflect personal associations, categories, and concept, all of which are individual representations based on meaning and relevance to that individual. The tags, or keywords, are designated by users. Consequently, tags represent a user's associations corresponding to the resource. Commonly tagged resources include videos, photos, articles, websites, and email. Tags are beneficial for a couple of reasons. First, they help to structure and organize large amounts of digital resources in a manner that makes them easily accessible when users attempt to locate the resource at a later time. The second aspect is social in nature, that is to say that users may search for new resources and content based on the tags of other users. Even the act of browsing through common tags may lead to further resources for knowledge acquisition.

Tags that occur more frequently with specific resources are said to be more strongly connected. Furthermore, tags may be connected to each other. This may be seen in the frequency in which they co-occur. The more often they co-occur, the stronger the connection. Tag clouds are often utilized to visualize connectivity between resources and tags. Font size increases as the strength of association increases.

Tags show interconnections of concepts that were formerly unknown to a user. Therefore, a user's current cognitive constructs may be modified or augmented by the metadata information found in aggregated social tags. This process promotes knowledge acquisition through cognitive irritation and equilibration. This theoretical framework is known as the co-evolution model of individual and collective knowledge.

The co-evolution model focuses on cognitive conflict in which a learner's prior knowledge and the information received from the environment are dissimilar to some degree. When this incongruence occurs, the learner must work through a process cognitive equilibration in order to make personal cognitive constructs and outside information congruent. According to the coevolution model, this may require the learner to modify existing constructs or simply add to them. The additional cognitive effort promotes information processing which in turn allows individual learning to occur.

== Examples ==
- Archive of Our Own: fan fiction archive
- BibSonomy: social bookmarking and publication-sharing system
- del.icio.us: public tagging service
- Diigo: social bookmarking website
- Flickr: shared photos
- Garageband Preference Engine: music uploads
- Instagram: online photo-sharing and social networking service
- Many libraries' online catalogs
- Last.fm: music listening community and algorithmic radio stations
- Mendeley: social reference management software
- MusicBrainz: online music metadata database
- OpenStreetMap: map database
- Pinterest: photo sharing and saving website
- Steam: video game store
- StumbleUpon: content discovery engine
- Twitter hashtags
- Tumblr tags
- The World Wide Web Consortium's Annotea project with user-generated tags in 2002.
- WordPress: blogging tool and Content Management System

== See also ==
- Autotagging
- Blogosphere
- Collective intelligence
- Enterprise bookmarking
- Folk taxonomy
- Faceted classification
- Hierarchical clustering
- Semantic annotation
- Semantic similarity
- Thesaurus
- Weak ontology
- Wiki
