= Social bookmarking =

Online service to store web links

Social bookmarking is an online service which allows users to add, annotate, edit, and share bookmarks of web documents. Many online bookmark management services have launched since 1996; Delicious, founded in 2003, popularized the terms "social bookmarking" and "tagging". Tagging is a significant feature of social bookmarking systems, allowing users to organize their bookmarks and develop shared vocabularies known as folksonomies.

== Common features ==
Unlike file sharing, social bookmarking does not save the resources themselves, merely bookmarks that reference them, i.e. a link to the bookmarked page. Descriptions may be added to these bookmarks in the form of metadata, so users may understand the content of the resource without first needing to download it for themselves. Such descriptions may be free text comments, votes in favor of or against its quality, or tags that collectively or collaboratively become a folksonomy. Folksonomy is also called social tagging, "the process by which many users add metadata in the form of keywords to shared content".

In a social bookmarking system, users save links to web pages that they want to remember and/or share. These bookmarks are usually public, and can be saved privately, shared only with specified people or groups, shared only inside certain networks, or another combination of public and private domains. The allowed people can usually view these bookmarks chronologically, by category or tags, or via a search engine.

Most social bookmark services encourage users to organize their bookmarks with informal tags instead of the traditional browser-based system of folders, although some services feature categories/folders or a combination of folders and tags. They also enable viewing bookmarks associated with a chosen tag, and include information about the number of users who have bookmarked them. Some social bookmarking services also draw inferences from the relationship of tags to create clusters of tags or bookmarks.

Many social bookmarking services provide web feeds for their lists of bookmarks, including lists organized by tags. This allows subscribers to become aware of new bookmarks as they are saved, shared, and tagged by other users. It also helps to promote your sites by networking with other social book markers and collaborating with each other.

As these services have matured and grown more popular, they have added extra features such as ratings and comments on bookmarks, the ability to import and export bookmarks from browsers, emailing of bookmarks, web annotation, and groups or other social network features.

== History ==
A user page on del.icio.us in May 2004, displaying bookmarks with tags

The concept of shared online bookmarks is believed to have originated around April 1996 with the launch of itList, the features of which included public and private bookmarks. Another system known as WebTagger, developed by a team at the Computational Sciences Division at NASA, was presented at the Sixth International WWW Conference held in Santa Clara on April 7–11, 1997. WebTagger included several advanced social bookmarking features including the ability to collaboratively share and organize bookmarks using a web-based interface, provide comments and organize them according to categories. Within the next three years, online bookmark services became competitive, with venture-backed companies such as Backflip, Blink, Clip2, ClickMarks, HotLinks, and others entering the market. They provided folders for organizing bookmarks, and some services automatically sorted bookmarks into folders (with varying degrees of accuracy). Blink included browser buttons for saving bookmarks; Backflip enabled users to email their bookmarks to others and displayed "Backflip this page" buttons on partner websites. Lacking viable revenue models, this early generation of social bookmarking companies failed as the dot-com bubble burst—Backflip closed citing "economic woes at the start of the 21st century". In 2005, the founder of Blink said, "I don't think it was that we were 'too early' or that we got killed when the bubble burst. I believe it all came down to product design, and to some very slight differences in approach."

Founded in 2003, Delicious (then called del.icio.us) pioneered tagging and coined the term social bookmarking. Frassle, a blogging system released in November 2003, included social bookmarking elements. In 2004, as Delicious began to take off, similar services Furl, Simpy, Spurl.net, and unalog were released, along with CiteULike and Connotea (sometimes called social citation services) and the related recommendation system StumbleUpon. Also in 2004, the social photo sharing website Flickr was released, and inspired by Delicious it soon added a tagging feature. In 2006, Ma.gnolia (later renamed to Gnolia), Blue Dot (later renamed to Faves), Mister Wong, and Diigo entered the bookmarking field, and Connectbeam included a social bookmarking and tagging service aimed at businesses and enterprises. In 2007, IBM released its Lotus Connections product. In 2009, Pinboard launched as a bookmarking service with paid accounts. As of 2012, Furl, Simpy, Spurl.net, Gnolia, Faves, and Connectbeam are no longer active services.

Digg was founded in 2004 with a related system for sharing and ranking social news, followed by competitors Reddit in 2005 and Newsvine in 2006. As of January 20, 2016, Reddit is now the 32nd highest ranking in the world and Digg is no longer a social bookmarking platform and has dropped out of the top 1000.

== Folksonomy ==
A simple form of shared vocabularies does emerge in social bookmarking systems (folksonomy). Collaborative tagging exhibits a form of complex systems (or self-organizing) dynamics. Although there is no central controlled vocabulary to constrain the actions of individual users, the distributions of tags that describe different resources have been shown to converge over time to stable power law distributions. Once such stable distributions form, the correlations between different tags can be examined to construct simple folksonomy graphs, which can be efficiently partitioned to obtain a form of community or shared vocabularies. While such vocabularies suffer from some of the informality problems described below, they can be seen as emerging from the decentralized actions of many users, as a form of crowdsourcing.

From the point of view of search data, there are drawbacks to such tag-based systems: no standard set of keywords (i.e., a folksonomy instead of a controlled vocabulary), no standard for the structure of such tags (e.g., singular vs. plural, capitalization), mistagging due to spelling errors, tags that can have more than one meaning, unclear tags due to synonym/antonym confusion, unorthodox and personalized tag schemata from some users, and no mechanism for users to indicate hierarchical relationships between tags (e.g., a site might be labeled as both cheese and cheddar, with no mechanism that might indicate that cheddar is a refinement or sub-class of cheeses).

== Uses ==
For individual users, social bookmarking can be useful as a way to access a consolidated set of bookmarks from various computers, organize large numbers of bookmarks, and share bookmarks with contacts. Institutions, including businesses, libraries, and universities have used social bookmarking as a way to increase information sharing among members. Social bookmarking has also been used to improve web search.

=== Enterprise bookmarking ===
Unlike social bookmarking, where individuals can bookmark their favorite web resources to share those with the public on the internet, enterprise bookmarking is for knowledge management and sharing it within a specific network of an organization. Enterprise bookmarking is used by the users of an organization to tag, manage and share bookmarks on the web as well as the knowledge base of the organization's databases and file servers.

=== Libraries ===
Libraries have found social bookmarking to be useful as an easy way to provide lists of informative links to patrons. The University of Pennsylvania (UP) was one of the first library adopters with its PennTags.

=== Education ===
Social bookmarking tools are an emerging educational technology that has been drawing more of educators' attention over the last several years. This technology offers knowledge sharing solutions and a social platform for interactions and discussions. These tools enable users to collaboratively underline, highlight, and annotate an electronic text, in addition to providing a mechanism to write additional comments on the margins of the electronic document. For example, Delicious could be used in a course to provide an inexpensive answer to the question of rising course materials costs. RISAL (Repository of Intean organization's users to manage and share bookmarks on the web and supporting teaching and learning at the university level.

Social bookmarking tools have several purposes in an academic setting including: organizing and categorizing web pages for efficient retrieval; keeping tagged pages accessible from any networked computer; sharing needed or desired resources with other users; accessing tagged pages with RSS feeds, cell phones and PDAs for increased mobilan organization's users to tag, manage and share bookmarks on the web and giving students another way to collaborate with each other and make collective discoveries.

One requirement unique to education is that resources often have one URL that describes the resource, with another for the actual learning content. XtLearn.net allows bookmarking of both in one step, the relevant URL being delivered to either tutors or learners, depending on the delivery context. It also demonstrates integration with traditional learning content repositories, such as Jorum, NLN, Intute and TES.

== Comparison with search engines ==
In comparison to search engines, a social bookmarking system has several advantages over traditional automated resource location and classification software, such as search engine spiders. All tag-based classification of Internet resources (such as web sites) is done by human beings, who understand the content of the resource, as opposed to software, which algorithmically attempts to determine the meaning and quality of a resource. Also, people can find and bookmark web pages that have not yet been noticed or indexed by web spiders. Additionally, a social bookmarking system can rank a resource based on how many times it has been bookmarked by users, which may be a more useful metric for end-users than systems that rank resources based on the number of external links pointing to it. However, both types of ranking are vulnerable to fraud, (see Gaming the system), and both need technical countermeasures to try to deal with this.

== Abuse ==
Social bookmarking is susceptible to corruption and collusion. Due to its popularity, some have begun to use it as a tool to use along with search engine optimization to make their website more visible. The more often a web page is submitted and tagged, the better chance it has of being found. Spammers have started bookmarking the same web page multiple times and/or tagging each page of their web site using a lot of popular tags, obligating developers to constantly adjust their security system to overcome abuses. Furthermore, since social bookmarking generates backlinks, social bookmark link generating services are used by some webmasters in an attempt to improve their websites' rankings in search engine results pages.

== See also ==
- Bookmark manager
- List of social bookmarking websites
- Models of collaborative tagging
- Semantic Web
- Social media
- Social networking service
- Social software
- Social network aggregation
- Crowdsourcing
