= TopXNotes =

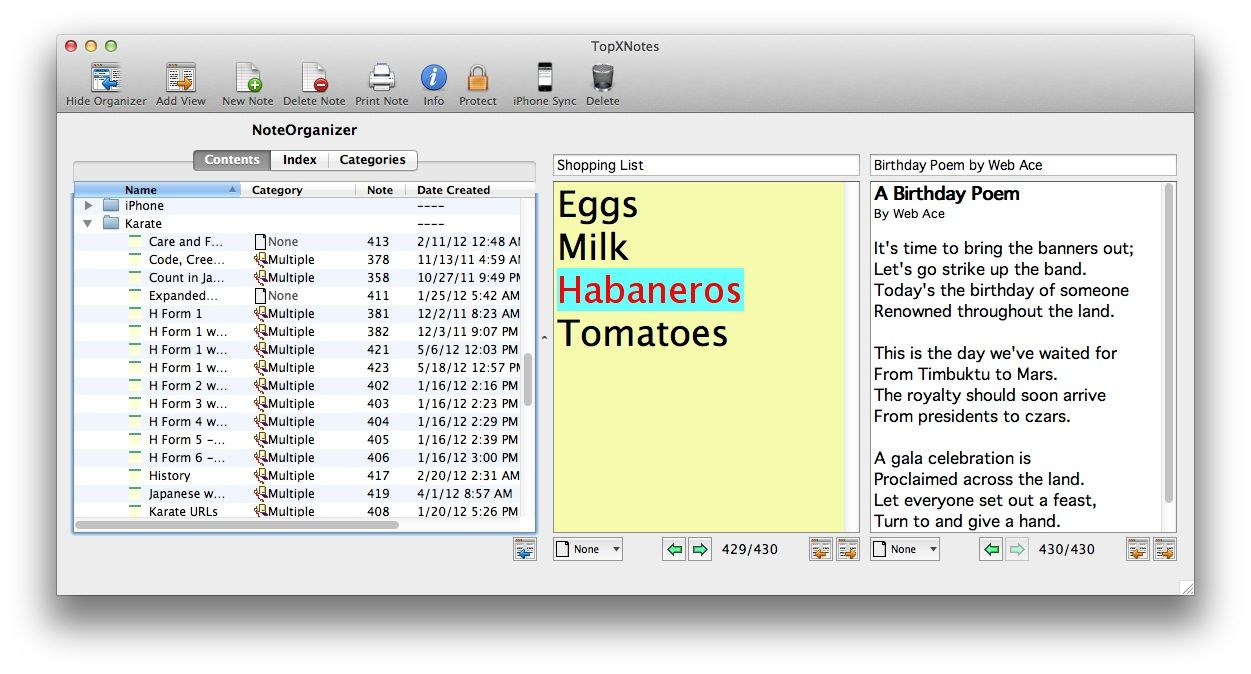
- Screenshot from TopXNotes showing NoteOrganizer and two notes
- Original authors: James Lee, Lewis Garrett, Dirk Maasen, Gregory Dow
- Developer: Tropical Software
- Stable release: v1.8.0 / June 23, 2014; 12 years ago
- Operating system: Mac OS X
- License: App Store (iOS)
- Website: tropic4.com/topxnotes.html

TopXNotes is a hybrid personal note and information organizer and password protector for Macintosh computers which allows notes to be entered and organized. It syncs notes to mobile devices — iPhone, iPad, and iPod touch.

Formatting options are placed in a toolbar above the current note, including font, size, style, text color, emphasis color (highlighting), document color, and justification. The program also offers the option of checking spelling as text is being entered.

Sorting by note name, category, creation date, or modified date allows desired notes to be isolated. A search function locates text inside any or all notes.

Categories can be created and assigned to notes. Notes or groups of notes can be imported or exported.

TopXNotes can password-protect the entire database or individual notes. It also supports write-protected notes.

The QuickNotes function puts the notes most often used at-hand even when the program itself is hidden.

The program keeps several backups in its data folder, allowing a previous version of a note to be retrieved even if it was deleted.

The program contains its own Read Me file as well as built-in help.

== Create, Format, and Save ==
Text: Notes can be created by typing, importing text or files, or by dragging from other notes, other programs, or files. The sliding text toolbar can be used to select font, size, style, text color, emphasis color, document color, or alignment. There are no limits on the number of notes or note size.

Drag and Drop Text can be moved among notes, or to or from any other text application, using cut and paste or drag and drop. Entire notes can be dragged to RTF (Rich Text Format) documents on the desktop, or a document can be dragged into TopXNotes.

Auto-Save, Import and Export Autosave automatically saves the entire database upon page turn or time intervals or both. Straight text or RTF documents can be imported or exported.

Samples and Templates The program automatically recognizes links to websites or email which can be clicked to launch a web browser directly to the links. Links can be renamed as desired. Templates and over 100 samples are available to get started.

== Organize, Categorize, and Group ==
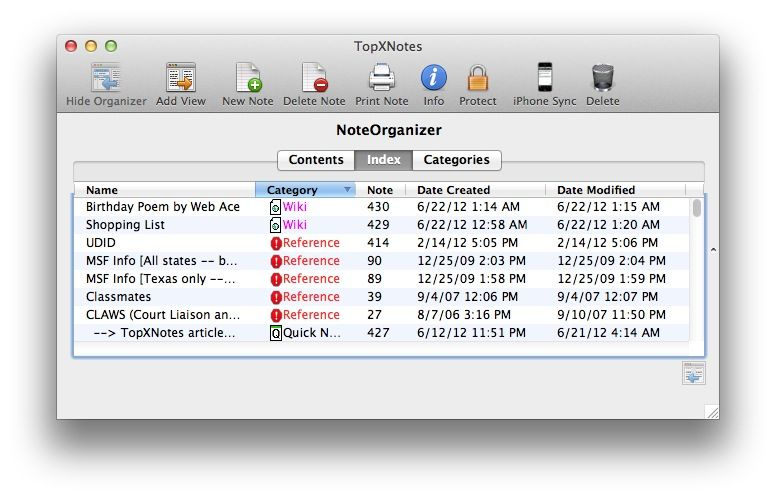
NoteOrganizer sorted by Category

NoteOrganizer NoteOrganizer is an interactive table of contents that can be shown as a separate view in the main window. It allows sorting by name, date, category or group.

Categories Categories are like labels in the Finder, but can be given a choice of name, color and icon. Notes can be put into multiple categories.

Groups Groups are like tags or folders in the Finder. Groups can be created at will and notes can be dragged into particular groups to organize them.

== View Multiple Ways ==
NoteOrganizer Notes can be organized using NoteOrganizer, Groups, and Categories. The interactive indexing and sorting within NoteOrganizer allows any note to be found.

MultiView MultiView can show a single note, just the NoteOrganizer, a note and the NoteOrganizer, or multiple views at once.

== Ways to Access Notes ==
Note Views Notes can be selected by picking from the QuickNotes menu, clicking an arrow, or clicking in the NoteOrganizer to open them. From the Text menu, over a dozen templates or over 100 samples can be selected.

MultiView MultiView allows viewing as many notes as will fit on the screen at the same time.

QuickNotes QuickNotes is a mini-window which always floats on top, with a menu holding selected notes available for use. QuickNotes is also available directly from the Dock at the edge of the screen.

== Sync with Mobile Devices ==
Notes from TopXNotes on a Macintosh can be synced to an iPhone, iPad, or iPod touch A zoom control on the iPhone accesses larger text. TopXNotes Touch can create notes on a mobile device while on the go, and those notes can be synced back to the Macintosh using a home Wi-Fi.

TopXNotes Touch supports backup and restore directly to mobile devices. If a deleted note is later needed, the Restore function on the mobile device can retrieve the missing information. It allows emailing a note directly — click and send. It also supports landscape mode note-editing. With the iPhone 4s. text can be dictated directly into TopXNotes.

== System Requirements ==
- A PPC or Intel based Macintosh with Mac OS 10.3.9 or higher
- Mac OS X Mountain Lion compatible
- Normally less than 40MB disk space (depending on amount of notes stored)
- 20-50 MB RAM (depends on number of note views open)
- Wi-Fi (if syncing with mobile devices)
