= LFS =

LFS may stand for:

== Organizations ==
- Libertarian Futurist Society, annually presents the Prometheus award for best libertarian Science Fiction
- Lutheran Family Services of Virginia, a non-profit human services organization
- Lincoln Financial Sports, a sports production company
- London Free School, a counterculture/hippie collective that organised the first Notting Hill Carnival
- Lundy Field Society, a charity supporting the study and conservation of history, natural history and archaeology on the island of Lundy

== Schools ==
- London Film School, a graduate film school in the United Kingdom
- French School of Seoul (Lycée français de Séoul)
- Lycée Français de Shanghai
- French School of Singapore (Lycée français de Singapour)

== Computing ==
- Live for Speed, a series of computer racing simulator
- Linux From Scratch, a kit for building Linux distributions
- Large File Summit, an industry initiative to form large file support
- Large-file support, support for files larger than 2 GiB
- Git Large File Storage, an extension for the Git version control system
- Live File System, Microsoft's implementation of Universal Disk Format (UDF) 2.5 in Windows Vista
- Log File System, Microsoft's NTFS log of file metadata pending commit
- Log-structured File System (BSD), a log-structured file system for NetBSD
- Logic File System, a research file system that uses propositional logic for querying and navigating files

== Other ==
- Luiz Felipe Scolari (born 1948), Brazilian football manager
- Nova Bus LF Series or Nova LFS, a bus manufactured by Nova Bus used mainly for public transit
- Labour Force Survey, a household survey of employment statistics conducted in all European Union countries as well as Canada, Australia and New Zealand
- Li–Fraumeni syndrome
- Laminar Flame speed
