= Semantic file system =

File system prioritizing associative access

Semantic file systems are file systems used for information persistence which structure the data according to their semantics and intent, rather than their location, as with hierarchical file systems. It allows the data to be addressed by their content (associative access). Traditional hierarchical file-systems tend to impose a burden, for example when a sub-directory layout is contradicting a user's perception of where files would be stored. Having a tag-based interface alleviates this hierarchy problem and enables users to query for data in an intuitive fashion.

Semantic file systems raise technical design challenges as indexes of words, tags or elementary signs of some sort have to be created and constantly updated, maintained and cached for performance to offer the desired random, multi-variate access to files in addition to the underlying, mostly traditional block-based filesystem.

A semantic file system can be envisioned as a part of a semantic desktop.

== History ==
The notion of semantic file system was proposed in 1991 by researchers of the MIT and École des Mines de Paris. They proposed an integrated system whose main query interface looked like a traditional file system interface via a virtual directory system that interpreted a path as a conjunctive query. Their implementation had automatic extraction of the relevant metadata via what they called file type specific transducers.

Starting in around 2004, a new wave of implementations centered on manual tagging of files and folders.

In 2008, researchers proposed to integrate semantic file systems with Semantic Web technologies.

== Types of metadata ==
=== Tags ===
Tags can be used instead of folders to circumvent the limits of a hierarchical model.

=== File type-specific ===
Gifford et al. suggested the idea of file type-specific metadata automatically extracted by a file-type specific transducer.

For instance, for a source code text file, metadata could include the names of the procedures that the program exports or imports, procedure types, and the files included by the program. For a document, its date, author, title and structure (sections and subsections). For an e-mail, its sender, recipient and subject.

=== Lineage ===
In scientific workflows, provenance of a data file is important. A scientist might want to select a results file by filtering by the input dataset.

== Architecture ==
Vasudevan and Pazandak introduce the distinction between integrated and augmented approaches:

- In integrated approaches, semantics are a feature of the file system.
  - Tightly coupled systems are implemented within a file system
  - Loosely coupled systems are implemented on top of a classical file system, but hide its interface.
- In augmented approaches, semantics are an abstraction on top of a classical file system. Access to the classical file system interface is maintained, the user can choose.

They suggest Open systems architecture as being well adapted to semantic file system implementations.

=== Compatibility with hierarchical file systems ===
Even integrated semantic file systems may choose to expose an interface for compatibility with existing local or distributed file system protocols. For instance, Gifford et al.’s 1991 implementation was fully compatible with NFS.

=== Metadata storage ===
Extended file attributes provided by the file system can be a way to store the metadata although technical limitations (eg 1KiB for total attributes keys and values together (ext4) make this approach unusable for real use.

A relational database is another very frequent way to store the metadata.

== Research implementations ==
Name	Type	Metadata	OS	Date	Comment
Lineage File System	File system extension	Lineage	Linux	2005	Modifies the Linux kernel to log all process creation and file-related system calls. Uses a MySQL database.
SemFS (formerly TagFS)	File system	Tags	Linux, Windows	2006	On Windows, can be mounted as a WebDAV drive. On Linux, based on FUSE. Tags are stored as RDF. Uses an internal file system, not exposed.
SFS	File system extension	File type-specific	Linux	1991	

== Implementations ==
Name	Type	Metadata	OS	License	Programming language(s)	Last update	Comment
Be File System (BFS)	File system		BeOS	Proprietary; last version is freeware			Metadata is stored in extended file attributes. Works with file manager Tracker
dantalian	File system extension	Tags	Linux and contiguous POSIX-compatible file systems	Apache 2	Python	2016	Uses symlinks
dhtfs	User-level file system extension	Tags	Linux	BSD 3-clause	Python	2009	Based on FUSE
Elyse	Graphical file manager	Tags	Windows and MacOS	Proprietary, no cost		2021	
Fuse::TagLayer	File system extension	Tags	Linux	GPL v3 / AL v2	Perl	2013	Based on FUSE
Tabbles	Graphical file manager	Tags	Windows Vista to 11	Proprietary, freemium	.NET Framework		Uses a SQL Server relational database.
Tag2Find		Tags	Windows XP and Vista 32-bit			2007	
TagsForAll	Graphical file manager	Tags	Windows x64	Freemium		2014	70 tag limit in free version. Metadata is stored in two places: in files as ADS (Alternate Data Stream for NTFS), and in local database.
Tagsistant	File system	Tags	Linux	GPL	C	2017	Tag-based, based on FUSE
TagSpaces	Graphical file manager, web or desktop (uses Electron)	Tags	Windows, macOS, Linux, and Android.	AGPL (Freemium)	TypeScript, JavaScript, Java, Objective-C	Continues	
tagxfs	File system extension	Tags	Linux	Boost Software License 1.0	C++	2013	Extends the user space file system to a tag based hierarchy.
TMSU	Virtual file system	Tags				2022	Uses a SQLite relational database.
TransparenTag	File system	Tags	Linux, BSD	GPL v2	OCaml	2013	Data and tags are stored as regular files
WinFS	File system and manager	Any type	Windows XP	Proprietary	.NET Framework	2006	Uses a relational database
xtagfs	File system extension	Tags	MacOS X	GPL v2	Python	2009	Based on FUSE

== See also ==
- Content-addressable storage
- Logic File System
- Semantic desktop
- Semantic Web
