= Shanghai Gold Apple Bilingual School =

Private school in Shanghai, China

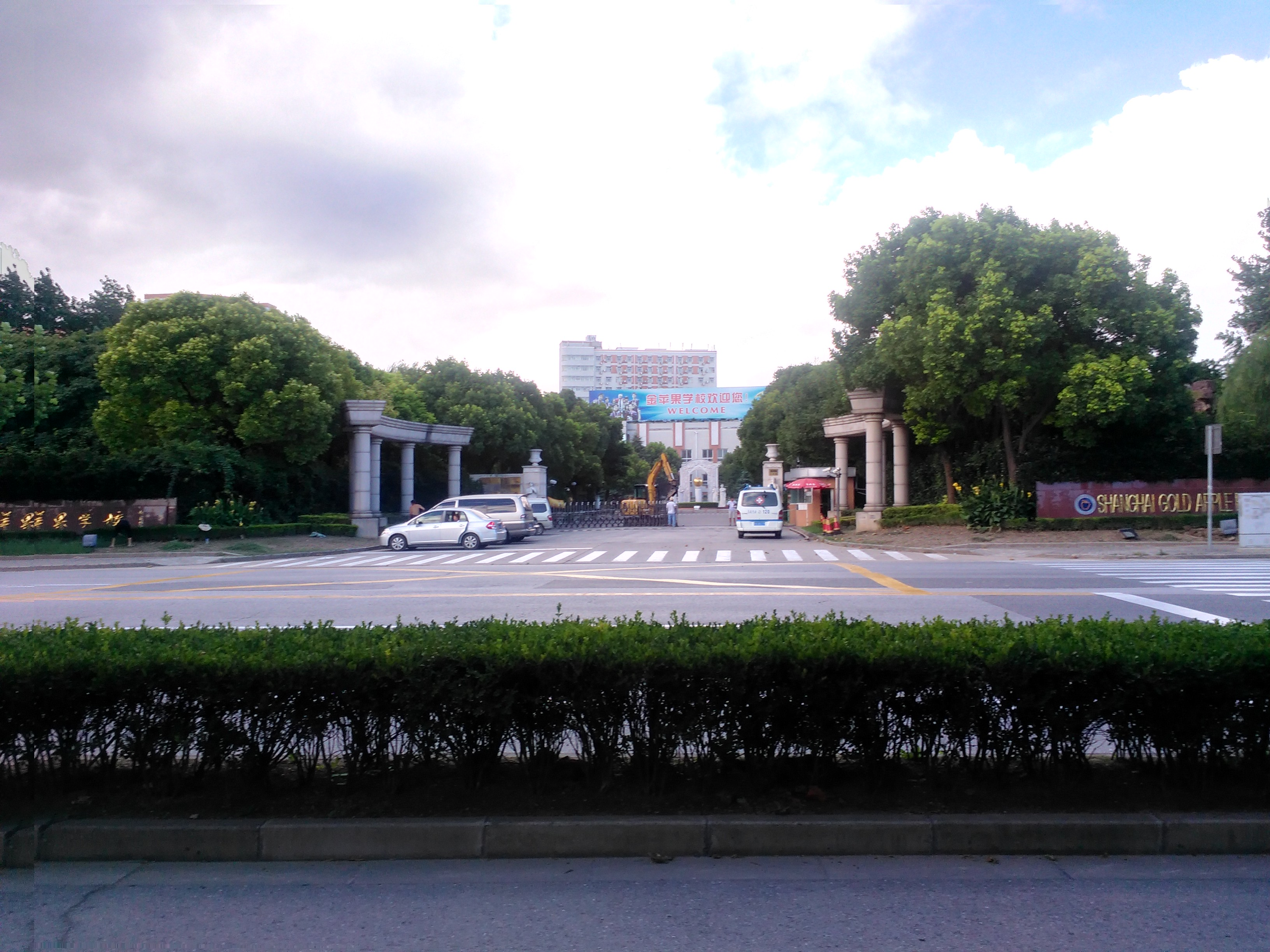
Shanghai Gold Apple Bilingual School

Shanghai Gold Apple Bilingual School (simplified Chinese: 上海市民办金苹果学校; traditional Chinese: 上海市民辦金蘋果學校; pinyin: Shànghǎishì Mínbàn Jīn Píngguǒ Xuéxiào "Shanghai City Private Gold Apple School") is a private boarding school for elementary through high school levels in Pudong, Shanghai. It opened in 2000. The Pudong Campus of the French School of Shanghai was on the property of the Gold Apple School.
