= German School Shanghai =

Coordinates: 31.1633°N 121.304°E

German School Shanghai Deutsche Schule Shanghai 上海德国学校

Location
- Hongqiao: 350 Gao Guang Lu, 201702 Shanghai; Yangpu: 758 Jiangwancheng Lu, 200433 Shanghai

Information
- Type: Private
- Established: 1995
- Principal: Susanne Heß (Hongqiao); Jörg Brosemann (Yangpu)
- Enrollment: approx. 1,250
- Website: www.ds-shanghai.de

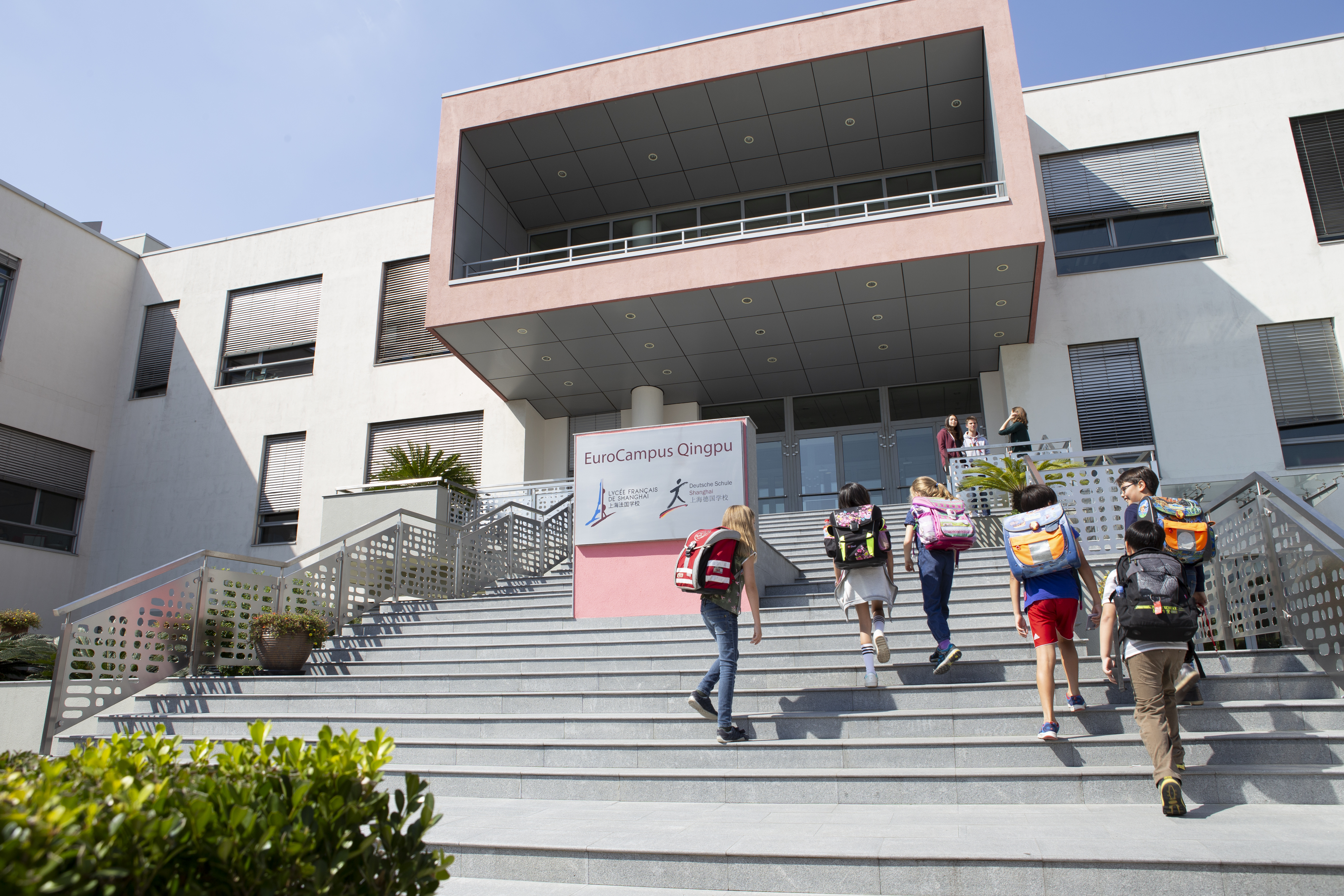
German School Shanghai Hongqiao and French School of Shanghai EuroCampus

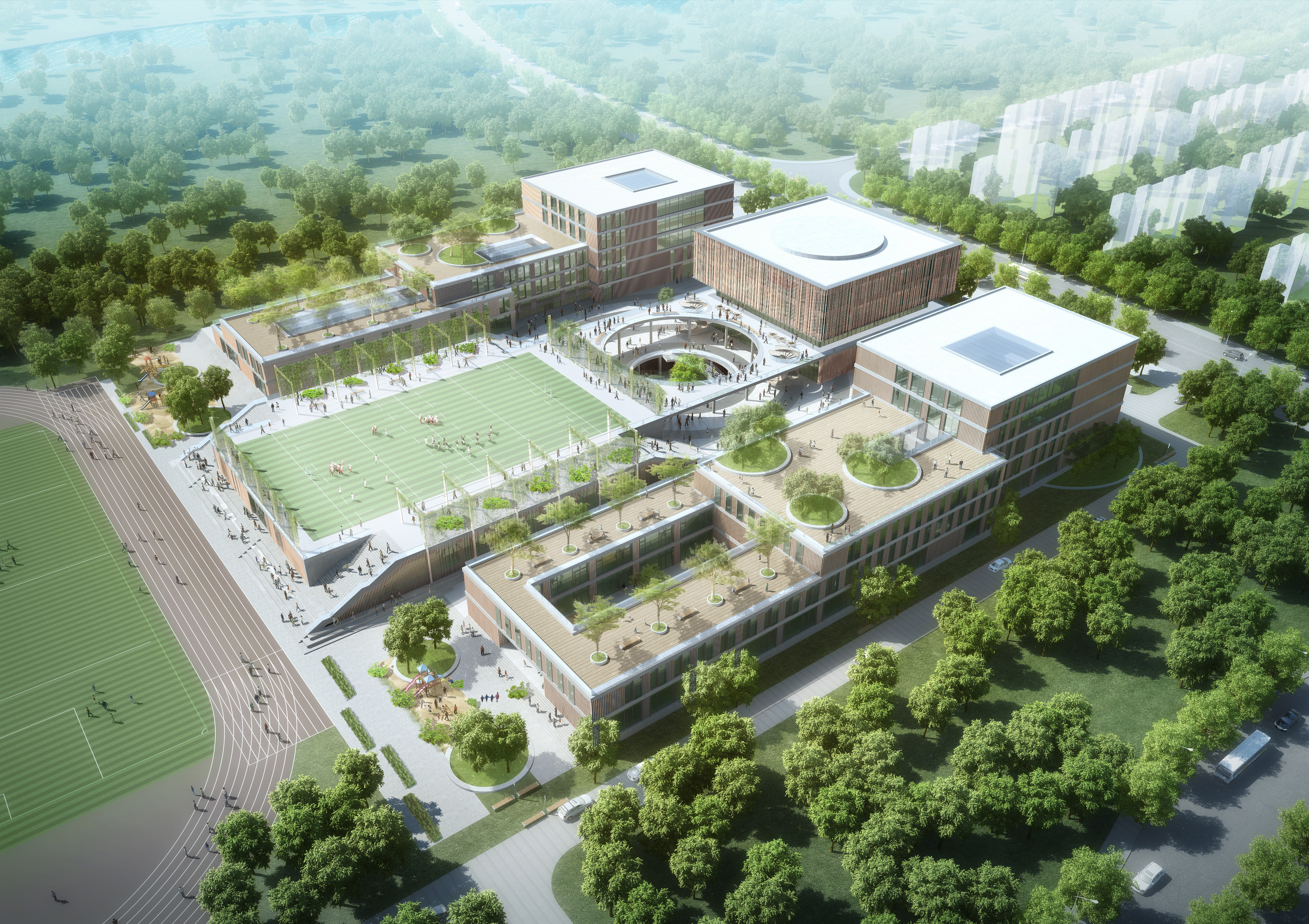
German School Shanghai Yangpu EuroCampus

The German School Shanghai (German: Deutsche Schule Shanghai, DSSH) is a private school in Shanghai, with locations in Hongqiao (DSSH) and Yangpu (DSSY).

== Campus ==
Academics are based on education in Germany, finishing with the Abitur.

The school contains:

- Kindergarten
- one-year preschool
- four-year elementary school (Grundschule)
- eight-year secondary school (Hauptschule, Realschule and Gymnasium)

The German School Shanghai and the French School of Shanghai (LFS) built a new combined Eurocampus for their students in Hongqiao, completed in 2005.

In September 2007 the Pudong Campus was opened, which is a branch of the DSS. In January 2020 the Pudong school community moved to a newbuilt Campus in Yangpu, the second Eurocampus in Shanghai.

Campuses

== See also ==
- List of international schools in Shanghai
- List of international schools
- Shanghai
- Qingpu District, Shanghai
- Pudong
