= École Française Internationale de Canton =

International school in Guangzhou, China

- 广州法国国际学校

Location
- Golden Beach Blue Bay, Caibin Middle Road, Shangshui Street 68, Jinshazhou, Baiyun District, 510168 (Note: 白云区金沙州彩滨中路尚水街68号 510168 金域蓝湾); Baiyun District, Guangzhou 100015; People's Republic of China; 23.157946°N 113.212717°E

Information
- School type: Private, International, AEFE
- Website: efcanton.com

École Française Internationale de Canton
- Simplified Chinese: 广州法国国际学校
- Traditional Chinese: 廣州法國國際學校
Transcriptions
Standard Mandarin
- Hanyu Pinyin: Guǎngzhōu Fǎguó Guójì Xuéxiào
Yue: Cantonese
- Jyutping: gwong2 zau1 faat3 gwok3 gwok3 zai3 hok6 haau6

The École Française Internationale de Canton (EFIC; Chinese: 广州法国国际学校) is a French international school located in "the paradiso", (Note: 金域蓝湾; 金域藍灣; Jīnyù Lánwān; gam1 wik6 laam4 waan1 meaning "Golden Beach Blue Bay") Baiyun District, Guangzhou. It serves levels maternelle (preschool) until lycée (senior high school). It was established in 1997. In 2016 it had 150 students.

It was previously in the Favorview (Note: 汇景新城; 匯景新城; Huìjǐng Xīnchéng; wui6 ging2 san1 sing4) area of Tianhe District. Before then, it was located at the GoldArch Riverdale (Note: 金亚花园; 金亞花園; Jīnyà Huāyuán; gam1 aa3 faa1 jyun4*2) development on Ersha Island, Yuexiu District.

It has direct education from toute petite section (less than 3 years) until quatrième, then uses CNED from troisième until terminale.

== See also ==
- Lycée Français International de Pékin
- Lycée Français de Shanghai
