= Jacques Ferrier =

French architect (born 1959)

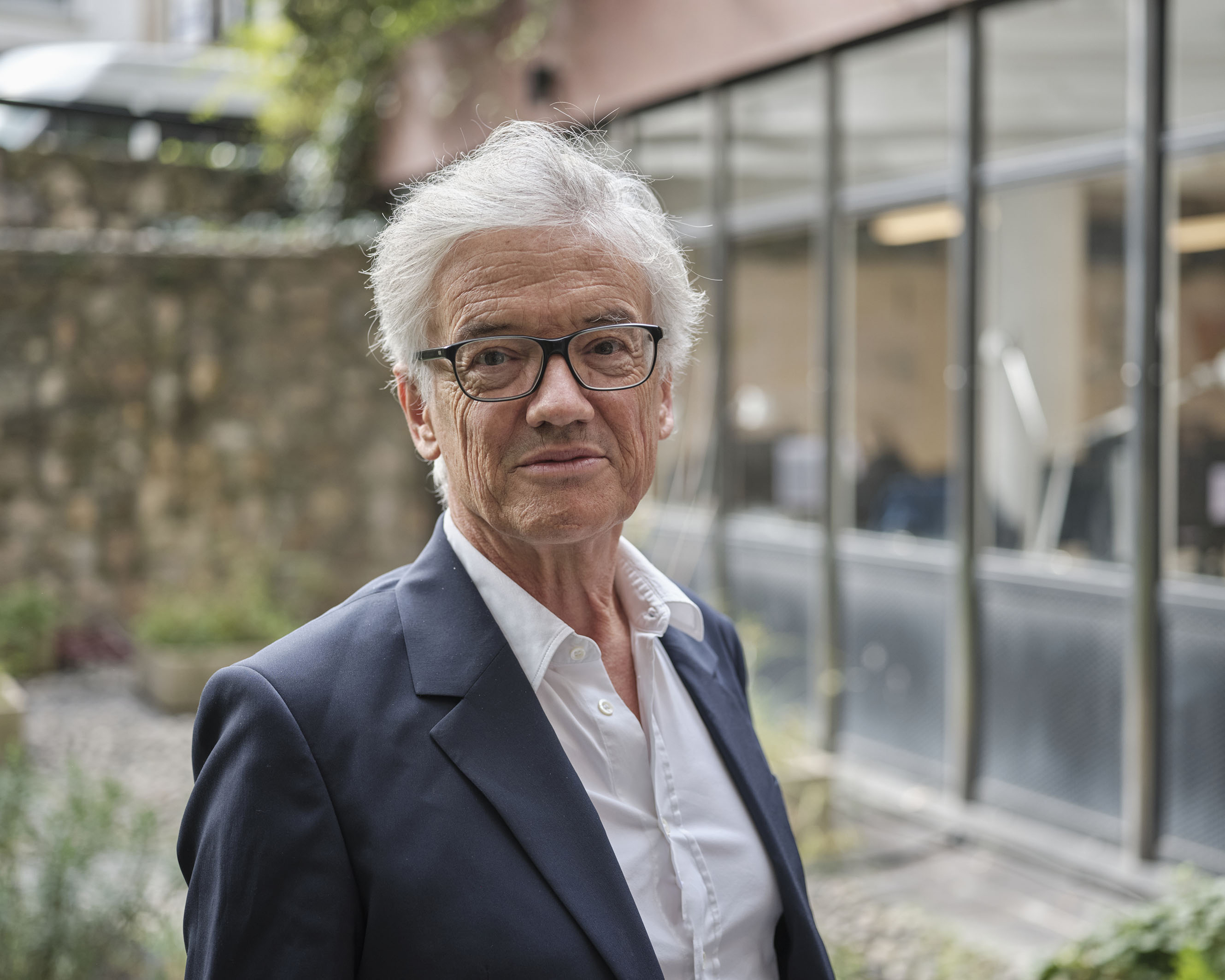
- Born: February 16, 1959 (age 67); Limoux, France
- Education: Ecole Centrale Paris, École Nationale Supérieure d'Architecture de Paris-Belleville
- Occupation: Architect
- Awards: Prix de la Première OEuvre du Moniteur, Chevalier de l'Ordre National du Mérite, Chevalier des Arts et des Lettres.
- Practice: Jacques Ferrier Architecture
- Buildings: Hachette Livre Headquarters, French Pavilion at Shanghai Expo 2010
- Projects: Belle Méditerranée, Hypergreen, Concept Office
- Website: http://www.jacques-ferrier.com

Jacques Ferrier (born February 16, 1959) is a French architect and urban planner.

== Biography ==
Following his architectural training at the École Nationale Supérieure d'Architecture de Paris-Belleville and the École Centrale de Paris, he created his own architecture firm, Jacques Ferrier Architecture, in Paris in 1993. His portfolio of work includes cultural and leisure facilities (such as the France Pavilion for Expo 2010 Shanghai and water park Aqualagon in Villages Nature Paris), showcase buildings (such as the head office of Champagnes Piper & Charles Heidsieck in Reims, the head office of publishers Hachette Livre in Vanves near Paris and the Airbus Delivery Centre in Toulouse), public buildings (notably the Collège de France in Paris, the headquarters of Métropole Rouen Normandie and the French International School of Beijing).

His projects follow a clear philosophy: creating architecture and cities for a creative and sustainable society.

In 2010, Jacques Ferrier and Pauline Marchetti, in collaboration with the philosopher Philippe Simay, created Sensual City Studio, a research laboratory devoted to a forward-looking, humanistic and sensitive approach to the city and architecture.

Jacques Ferrier is the author of a number of works and articles on the subject of architecture. His architectural work has been the subject of many publications, especially The Architecture of Jacques Ferrier (Thames&Hudson, London. He has been the recipient of a number of prizes and awards in France and abroad, including LEAF and BEX awards in London, Architizer A+Award in New-York, and Highly Commended mention at the WAF 2016 in Berlin.

In 2016 and 2017, several monographic exhibitions dedicated to his work were organized: 'Impressionismus at the Architektur Galerie Berlin', 'Non oppressive Design' at the DOKK1 in Aarhus, 'A vision for the Sensual City' in Manila, Singapore, Jakarta and Kuala Lumpur.

Jacques Ferrier is qualified to teach in French architectural schools (as "Professeur des Écoles d'Architecture"). He has been made both a Chevalier de l'Ordre National du Mérite and a Chevalier des Arts et des Lettres.

== Vision ==
The Sensual City project addresses the question of what urban planning should be, both today and tomorrow. The urban culture developed in the 20th century is steadily expanding. Over half the world's population now lives in cities, a proportion that is continually increasing, causing functional problems on an unprecedented scale. This situation threatens our planet's resources, as well as the way we live together in cities. In the Western world, there is a need to go beyond the traditional model of the historical urban model – European and American -- to take a fresh look not only at the city core, but also at the suburbs, the infrastructure, the transportation systems, and accept that they represent a fully-fledged contemporary urban landscape. Throughout the world, on all continents, giant cities with over ten million inhabitants are taking form. In the 21st century, hundreds of millions of people will find themselves living in an exclusively urban environment, an artificial universe in which technology will be omnipresent.

With the Sensual City, the intention is to develop an alternative approach, one in which technology is not obtrusive nor an end in itself. On the contrary, as technology is perfected it becomes invisible, it disappears from view and allows people to live in cities that can be construed as built landscapes, designed to offer a full sensorial experience. The city becomes an environment that incorporates a high level of sustainable development as well as a setting where people can take pleasure in living together and relate to its history as the founding source of civilization. To achieve these ends, it is essential that the city be deeply rooted to its specific culture, climate and geography.

The Sensual City was the subject of a symposium organized at the Collège de France in September 2009. Internationally recognized personalities - architects, urban planners, scientists, philosophers, sociologists and artists - crossed their eyes on the theme of sensuality linked to architecture and city planning.

== Achievements ==
=== Main works ===
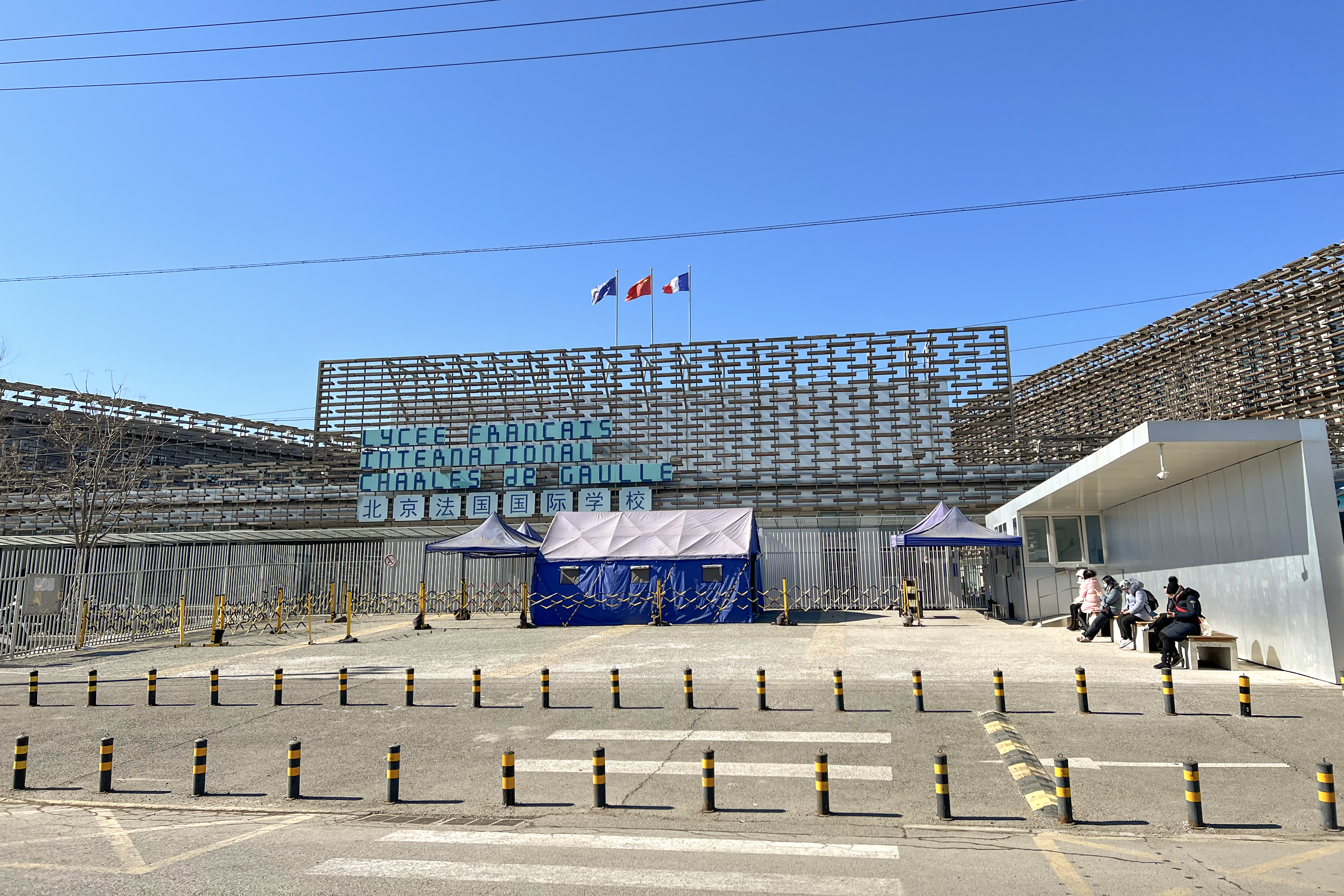
Lycée Français International Charles de Gaulle de Pékin

- 2018 : Restructuring of a bullring into a multi-purpose arena, Lunel, France
- 2018 : Office building T20, Shanghai, China
- 2018 : Office complex Yidian 2, Shanghai, China
- 2017 : Métropole Rouen Normandie Headquarters, Rouen, France
- 2017 : Aqualagon Waterpark for Villages Nature Paris (Eurodisney & Center Parcs), Marne-la-Vallée, France
- 2017 : Tour Lumière, Tours, France
- 2016 : Région Île-de-France Headquarters, phase 1, Saint-Ouen, France
- 2016 : French International School of Beijing, China
- 2016 : Real estate Quatuor - phase 1, Angers, France
- 2016 : Naval Group campus, Toulon, France
- 2015 : Housing complex « La Mantilla », Montpellier, France
- 2015 : Nakâra 4* Resiencial Hotel, Cap d’Agde, France
- 2015 : Yidian Office Campus, Shanghai, China
- 2015 : Bikers mutual Fund Headquarters, Pérols, France
- 2014 : Hachette Livre Headquarters, Vanves, France
- 2014 : Rénovation of the Collège de France, Paris, France
- 2014 : Dominium housing complex, Montpellier, France
- 2012 : ZAC Claude-Bernard Office building, Paris, France
- 2011 : Housing, Romainville, France
- 2011 : Jiading dormitory, China
- 2010 : Pavillon France, Shanghai Expo 2010, China
- 2010 : Museum, Xi’an, Chine
- 2009 : Multi-purpose hall and theatre extension, Le Cannet, France
- 2009 : Les Reflets du Drac, office building, Grenoble, France
- 2009 : Sulwhasoo Flagship store, Hong Kong, China
- 2009 : Jiading ZhuQiao School, Shanghai, Chine
- 2009 : Marcel Saupin, House of human science, Nantes, France
- 2008 : Champagnes Piper et Charles Heidsieck Headquarters, Reims, France
- 2008 : Sailing Museum Eric-Tabarly, Lorient, France
- 2008 : Fire and rescue station, Saint-Nazaire, France
- 2008 : Cardiological and pneumological rehabilitation center, Pont d’Héry, France
- 2007 : Centre de maintenance au HUB Roissy-Charles-de-Gaulle, France
- 2007 : Etablissement scolaire de Qingpu, Shanghai, Chine
- 2007 : Museum of French immigration to Canada, Tourouvre, France
- 2006 : Delivery Centre pour Airbus, Toulouse, France
- 2006 : Tram system shed, Valenciennes, France
- 2006 : Tenesol head office and factory, Toulouse, France
- 2006 : Laget Barruel House, Tressan, Hérault, France
- 2005 : Hypergreen, research project in partnership with Lafarge
- 2005 : Phénix Concept House, prototype house in Meaux, France
- 2004 : Air France Industries à Paris-Orly, France
- 2004 : Phénix Concept Office, prototype de bureaux HQE, en partenariat avec EDF
- 2003 : RATP office building, Paris, France
- 2003 : inter-regional laboratory, Oullins, France
- 2002 : Louis-Jouvet highschool, Gamaches, France
- 2001 : University library and administrative offices, Lille, France
- 2001 : Maison des Cannisses, Limoux, France
- 1999 : Isomer laboratory for the University of Nantes, France
- 1999 : Total Energie Headquarters, La-Tour-de-Salvagny, France
- 1999 : Renault vehicle testing facility, Guyancourt, France
- 1998 : Inria laboratories, Sophia-Antipolis, France
- 1998 : SAGEP water treatment plant, Joinville-le-Pont, France
- 1993 : Material Science Research Center for the Ecole des Mines de Paris, Évry, France
- 1990 : SAS Institute, rehabilitation of a castel, Gregy-sur-Yerres, France

=== Ongoing Projects ===
- CO’Met sports hall, congress center and exhibition center, Orléans, France
- Housing and hotels concept in Matinha, Lisbonne, Portugal
- Uptown village, Vilamoura, Portugal
- 3M Headquarters, Cergy-Pontoise, France
- International Conference Center of Pudong, Shanghai, China
- Région Ile-de-France Headquarters, phase 2, Saint-Ouen, France
- KM 21, Huangpu River, Shanghai, China
- Reinventing Paris, Ternes-Villiers, Paris, France
- Tram T9, Garage and maintenance hub, Paris-Orly Ville, France
- La Tuilerie cultural center, Limoux, France
- New Seaport Passenger Terminal, Sète, France
- Grand Central Saint-Lazare real estate, Paris, France
- Design and architectural consultant for the Grand Paris Express rapid transit, Île-de-France, France
- Quatuor real estate (offices, hotel, student residence), Angers, France
- Marseille Station 7 - Corail, Marseille, France

=== City Planning ===
- 2015: Urban & architectural planning of a coastline to urbanise, Cap d’Agde, France
- 2014: Urban reconversion of the PSA industrial zone, near Paris, France (ongoing)
- 2012: Zac Carmes Madeleine, Orleans, France
- 2011: Saint Germain-en-Laye, Lisière Péreire, France (ongoing)
- 2010: EuroRennes, Rennes, France (ongoing)
- 2010: Jiading High Tech Park, Shanghai, China (ongoing)
- 2010: Requalification of the French infantry school, Montpellier, France (competition)
- 2010: New area of the former site of the prisons of Lyon, in association with TER (competition)
- 2009: Urban planning of the Ile Seguin, Boulogne-Billancourt, France (competition)
- 2009: Urban study in Xi’an, China
- 2009: New Punggol Waterway, Singapore (competition)
- 2009: Urban planning of the Ko-Bogen area, Düsseldorf, Germany (competition)
- 2007: Paris in height workshop, research for the city of Paris, France
- 2007: Aerospace Campus of Toulouse, France
- 2006: Cancer Campus, Villejuif, France (study)
- 2006: Olympic Village Paris 2012, France (competition)
- 2004: Definition studies, conversion of Kodak sites, Sevran, France
- 2003: Studies for an urban park with housing dedicated to digital images, Arles, France
- 2002: Center of Excellence, Roissy-Gonesse, France (competition)
- 2001/ 2004: Urban land use studies for Renault properties, Boulogne-Billancourt, France

=== Scenography ===
- 2010: French Pavilion design, Shanghai, China
- 2003: Jean Prouvé exhibition design, Nancy, France
- 1997: Paris Sous-Verre exhibition design, Pavillon de l’Arsenal, Paris

=== Design ===
- 2010: Aluchair, chairs designed for Ligne Roset

== Exhibitions ==
- Non Oppressive Design, A Path towards the Sensual City, Dokk1, Aarhus, Denmark (2017)
- A Vision for the Sensual City, White Box, Kuala Lumpur, Malaysia (2017) Noble House, Jakarta, Indonesia (2017) Visma Art Gallery, Surabaya, Indonesia (2017) Urban Redevelopment Authority, Singapore (2016) National Museum of the Philippines, Manila (2016)
- Skin, Double Skin, a Sensual Approach to Building Envelope, Palazzo Beltrade, Milano, Italy (2017)
- Impressionismus, Architektur Galerie, Berlin, Germany (2017)
- Architecture = Durable / Architecture = Sustainable, Jacques Ferrier, commissaire d’exposition scientifique, Pavillon de l’Arsenal, Paris, and French Institutes in various countries (2016)
- A Reciprocal Perspective / Un Regard Réciproque, French Institute of Beijing, China; Minsheng Foundation, Shanghai, China (2015)
- La Gare Sensuelle / The Sensual Railway Station, Pavillon de l’Arsenal, Paris, France (2014) La Galerie d’Architecture, Paris, France (2012)

== Bibliography ==
- A History of Thresholds: Life, Death and Rebirth, co-author with Pauline Marchetti, éd. JOVIS Verlag GmbH, Berlin (2018)
- Belle Méditerranée, La Métropole Sensible / Towards a Sensory Metropolis, Sensual City Studio, éd. Métropolis / Archibooks (2014)
- La Possibilité d’une Ville, éd. Arléa, Paris (2013)
- Architecture = Durable / Architecture = Sustainable, catalogue of the itinerary exhibition, Jacques Ferrier, scientific curator, Pavillon de l’Arsenal, Paris
- Paris sous Verre, catalogue of the exhibition, Jacques Ferrier co-author with Bernard Marrey, Pavillon de l’Arsenal (1997)
- Construire en Acier, Jacques Ferrier co-auteur, Editions du Moniteur (2014)
- Usines 2, Jacques Ferrier, Ed.Electa-Moniteur, Paris (1991)
- Usines 1, Jacques Ferrier, Ed.Electa-Moniteur, Paris (1987)

== Monography ==
- The Architecture of Jacques Ferrier, Alexander Tzonis and Kenneth Powell, Thames & Hudson, London (2016)
- Pavillon France, Exposition universelle de Shanghai 2010, éd. Archibooks, Paris (2010)
- Cité de la Voile Eric-Tabarly, Silvana Editoriale, Milan/AAM Ed., Bruxelles/Ante Prima, Paris (2008)
- Making of, Phare & Hypergreen Towers, AAM Ed./Ante Prima, Paris (2006). ISBN 9782871431800
- Concept Office, architecture prototype, AAM Ed./Ante Prima (2005)
- Useful/ Utiles, The Poetry of Useful Things, La Poésie des Choses Utiles, Birkhäuser Basel-Boston-Berlin /Ante Prima, Paris (2004)
- Stratégies du disponible, éd. Passage Piétons, Paris (2004)
