= Lycée Français International Charles de Gaulle de Pékin =

French international school in Beijing, China

- 北京法国国际学校

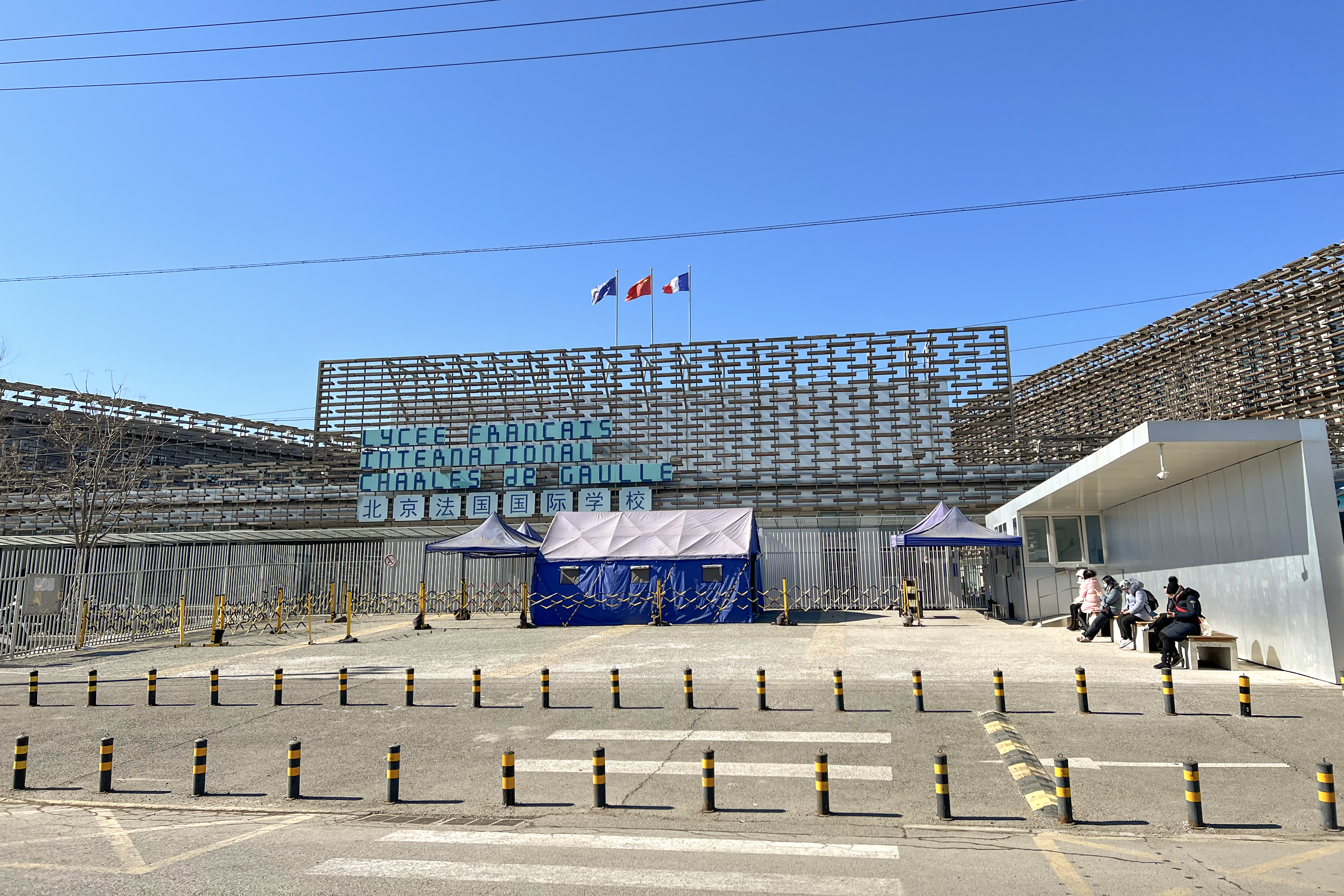

Location
- Xinjin Lu - Beijing; Chaoyang District, Beijing 100015; China; 40°01′32″N 116°31′40″E

Information
- School type: International, AEFE
- Founded: September 1965
- Headmaster: Audrey FOUILLARD
- Age range: 3-18
- Enrolment: 800
- Student to teacher ratio: 10:1
- Campus size: 9 Acres or 4 Hectares
- Campus type: Suburban
- Website: http://lfipekin.org/

Lycée Français International Charles de Gaulle de Pékin
- Simplified Chinese: 北京法国国际学校
- Traditional Chinese: 北京法國國際學校
- Literal meaning: Beijing French International School
Transcriptions
Standard Mandarin
- Hanyu Pinyin: Běijīng Fǎguó Guójì Xuéxiào

Lycée Français de Pékin
- Simplified Chinese: 北京法国学校
- Traditional Chinese: 北京法國學校
- Literal meaning: Beijing French School
Transcriptions
Standard Mandarin
- Hanyu Pinyin: Běijīng Fǎguó Xuéxiào
- Wade–Giles: Pei-ching Fa-kuo Hsüeh-hsiao

The Lycée Français International Charles de Gaulle de Pékin (LFIPékin; Chinese: 北京法国国际学校) is a French international school in Chaoyang District, Beijing. It has primary, junior high school (collège) and sixth-form/senior high school (lycée) levels. It is directly operated by the Agency for French Education Abroad (AEFE), an agency of the French government.

It was previously the Lycée Français International de Pékin (LFIP; "The International French School of Beijing" ) in French, and years earlier it was the Lycée Français de Pékin (Chinese: 北京法国学校).

The school first opened in September 1965.

== Student body ==
In 2014 the school had 950 students. At one time the school had 1,050 students. In 2019 it had 826 students.

As of 2017 its students originate from over 50 countries: 75% originate from Europe, 17% originate from Africa, 4.5% originate from the Americas, and 3.5% originate from Asia and Oceania.

== Campus locations ==
Since 10 May 2016, there is only one campus: in JingShunDongJie, Chaoyang District, Beijing 100600, China.

The campus opening ceremony was on 16 May 2016.

It was designed by a French architect, Jacques Ferrier; the total budget was 23.9 million euros (231 million Hong Kong dollars), with 16.5 million for building costs as well as other funds for a 40-year lease. The building has measures to prevent effects from Beijing's air pollution.

The groundbreaking ceremony for the new campus occurred on 19 October 2014. It has room for 1,500 students; this is an increase by 30% from the total capacity of the previous facilities. The current campus has an area of 37,000 square metres (400,000 sq ft), with 21,000 square metres (230,000 sq ft) occupied by buildings.

Prior to May 2016 there were three campuses: one for nursery/preschool (maternelle) classes, one for primary and junior high school (collège), and the senior high school (lycée) facilities at Chaoyang Community College (Chinese: 朝阳社区学院; pinyin: Cháoyáng Shèqū Xuéyuàn). The principal school campus was the primary and junior high campus.

== See also ==
- École Française Internationale de Canton
- Lycée Français de Shanghai
