= Glossary of file systems terms =

This is a glossary of common file system terms.

Access control lists
Does the file system support multi-user access control lists (ACLs).
Attributes
Lists the basic file attributes available.
Bad sector allocation
Describe how the file system allocates and isolates bad sectors.
Directory structure
Describes how the subdirectories are implemented.
File allocation
Describes how the file system allocates sectors in-use by files.
Inventor
List the names of those credited with the design of the file system specification. This should not include those responsible for writing the implementation.
Maximum date
The maximum year that can be handled by the file system, as per the specification.
Maximum filename size
The maximum number of characters that a file or directory name may contain.
Maximum files
The maximum number of files the file system can handle.
Maximum volume size
The maximum size of a volume that the file system specification can handle. This may differ from the maximum size an operating system supports using a given implementation of the file system.
Name
The full, non abbreviated, name of the file system itself.
Named streams
Determines if the file systems supports multiple data streams. NTFS refers to these as alternate data streams, HPFS as extended attributes and HFS calls them forks.
Namespace
Lists the characters that are legal within file and directory names.
Native operating system
The name of the operating system in which this file system debuted.
Partition identificator
The partitioning scheme and marker used to identify that a partition is formatted to this file system.
Per-file compression
Does the file system support real-time transparent compression and decompression of individual files.
Per-file encryption
Does the file system support real-time transparent encryption and decryption of individual files.
Per-volume compression
Does the file system support real-time transparent compression and decompression of an entire volume.
Per-volume encryption
Does the file system support real-time transparent encryption and decryption of an entire volume.

== Dates handled ==
What type of dates and times the file system can support, which may include:

Access date
This is the date the file was last accessed. An access can be a move, an open, or any other simple access. It can also be tripped by Anti-virus scanners, or Windows system processes. Therefore, caution has to be used when stating a “file was last accessed by user XXX” if there is only the “File Access” date in NTFS to work from.
Backed-up date
The date and time when the file was last backed up.
Changed date
The date and time related attributes were modified. This may include ACLs and the file/directory name.
Creation date
This is the date the file was “created” on the volume. This does not change when working normally with a file, e.g. opening, closing, saving, or modifying the file.
Modified date
This date as shown by Windows there has been a change to the file itself. E.g. if a notepad document has more data added to it, this would trip the date it was modified.
