= Label (macOS) =

In Apple's Macintosh operating systems, labels are a type of seven distinct colored and named parameters of metadata that can be attributed to items (files, folders and disks) in the filesystem. Labels were introduced in Macintosh System 7, released in 1991, and they were an improvement of the ability to colorize items in earlier versions of the Finder. Labels remained a feature of the Macintosh operating system through the end of Mac OS 9 in late 2001, but they were omitted from Mac OS X versions 10.0 to 10.2, before being reintroduced in version 10.3 in 2003, though not without criticism. During the short time period when Mac OS X lacked labels, third-party software replicated the feature.

== In classic Mac OS ==
In classic Mac OS versions 7 through 9, applying a label to an item causes the item's icon to be tinted in that color when using a color computer monitor (as opposed to the black-and-white monitors of early Macs), and labels can be used as a search and sorting criterion. There is a choice of seven colors because three bits are reserved for the label color: 001 through 111, and 000 for no label. The names of the colors can be changed to represent categories assigned to the label colors. Both label colors and names can be customized in the classic Mac OS systems; however, Mac OS 8 and 9 provided this functionality through the Labels tab in the Finder Preferences dialog, while System 7 provided a separate Labels control panel. Labels in Mac OS 9 and earlier, once customized, were specific to an individual install; booting into another install, be it on another Mac or different disk would show different colors and names unless set identically. A colorless label could be produced by changing a label's color to black or white.

== In Mac OS X and later ==
Mac OS X versions 10.3 to 10.8 apply the label color to the background of item names, except when an item is selected in column view, which changes the item name to the standard highlight color except for a label-colored dot after the name. Beginning in OS X 10.9, the label-colored background of item names is replaced with a small label-colored dot, and becomes a kind of tag.

== Relation to tags ==
The Mac operating system has allowed users to assign multiple arbitrary tags as extended file attributes to any item ever since OS X 10.9 was released in 2013. These tags coexist with the legacy label system for backward compatibility, so that multiple colored (or colorless) tags can be added to a single item, but only the last colored tag applied to an item will set the legacy label that will be seen when viewing the item in the older operating systems. Labeled items that were created in the older operating systems will superficially seem to be tagged in OS X 10.9 and later even though they are only labeled and lack the newer tag extended file attributes (until they are edited in the new system). Since label colors can be changed in classic Mac OS but are standardized and unchangeable in the newer operating systems, someone who wants to synchronize the label colors between a classic and modern system can change the label colors in classic Mac OS to match the newer system.

== See also ==
- Tag (metadata) § Assigned to computer files
