= Lycée Français de Shanghai =

International school in Shanghai, China

Coordinates: 31.1614°N 121.3083°E

Shanghai French School
- 上海法国外籍人员子女学校
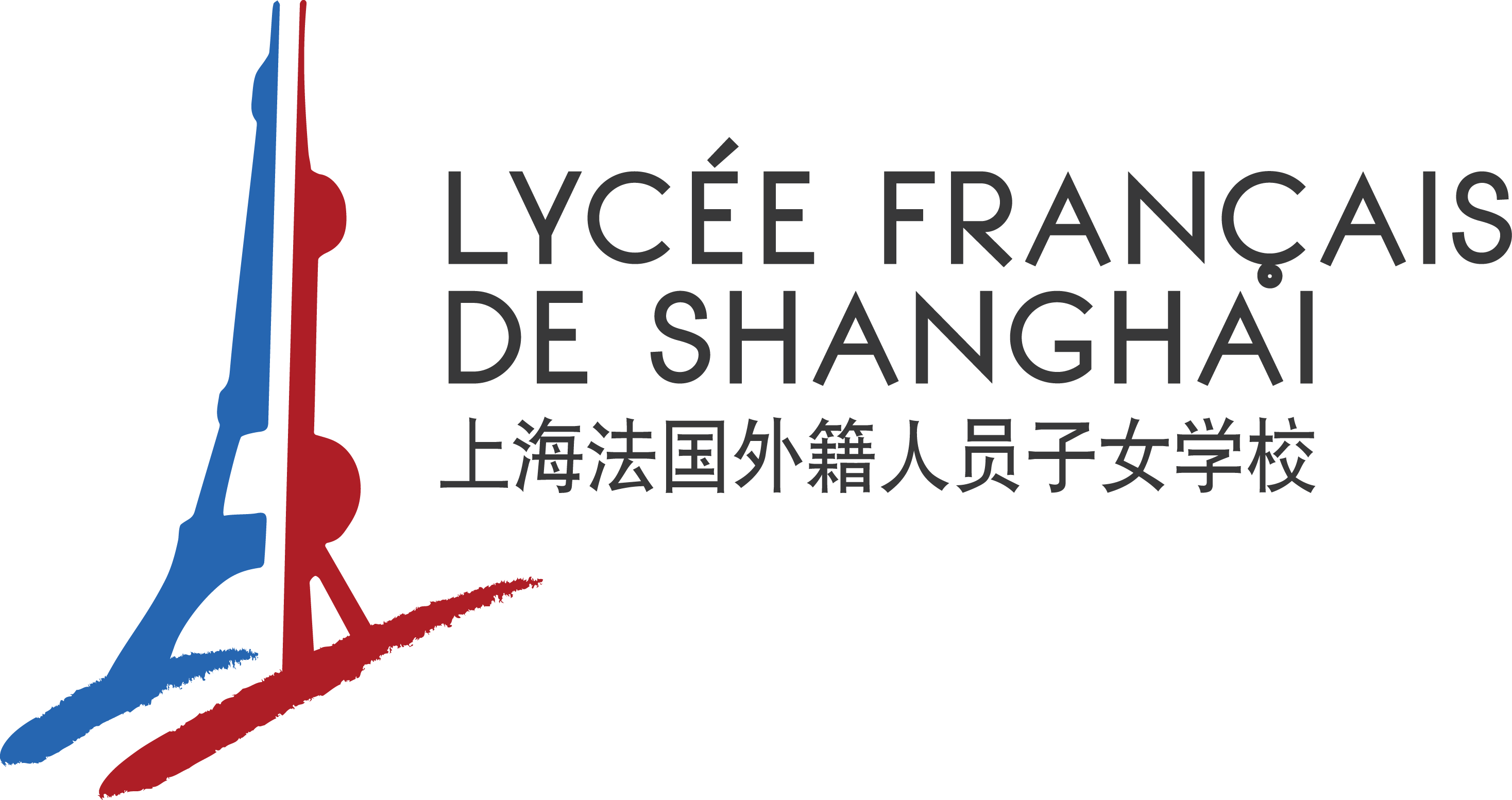

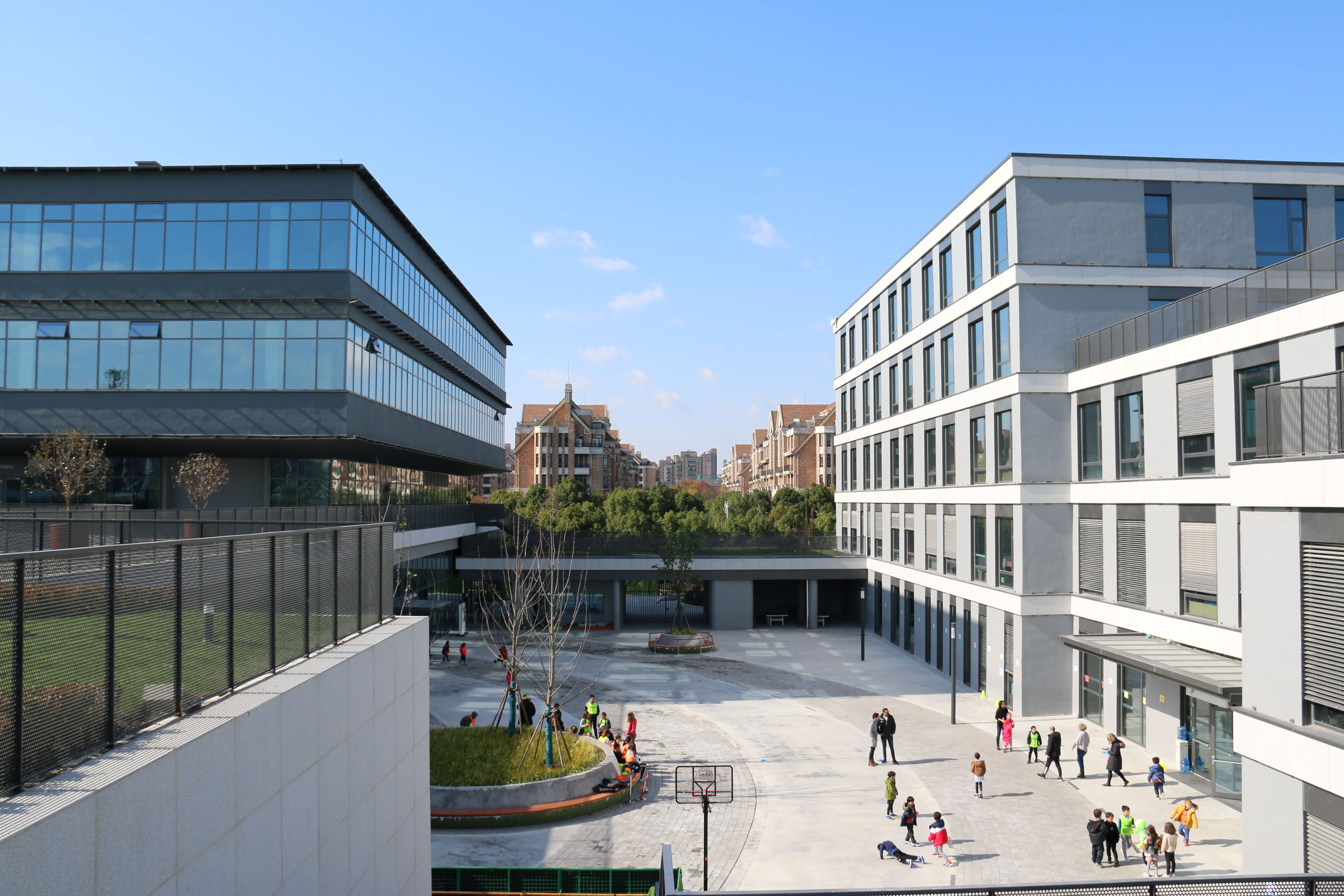
- EuroCampus (shared by the French School of Shanghai] Yangpu campuses)
- Shanghai Qingpu Campus: 350 Gaoguang road, Qingpu District, 201702 Shanghai; Shanghai Yangpu Campus: 788 Jiangwancheng Road, Yangpu District, Shanghai

Information
- Type: Private, comprehensive, secondary, co-educational Kindergarten, primary and secondary
- Established: 1995
- Principal: Laurent FOUILLARD
- Staff: 300+
- Grades: From kindergarten to high school
- Enrollment: 1500+ (approx.)
- Information: Shanghai French School is an international nonprofit institution that welcomes more than 1530 students, from Pre-kindergarten to the French Baccalaureate (ages 2 to 18), on its Qingpu and Yangpu campuses. The school welcomes all foreign nationalities, not just French nationals. Students at the French School come from over 60 different countries, making it a genuinely international school.
- Website: www.lyceeshanghai.com

Lycée Français de Shanghai
- Simplified Chinese: 上海法国外籍人员子女学校
- Traditional Chinese: 上海法國外籍人員子女學校
Transcriptions
Standard Mandarin
- Hanyu Pinyin: Shànghǎi Fǎguó Wàijí Rényuán Zǐnǚ Xuéxiào

The French School of Shanghai (French: Lycée Français de Shanghai is a French school for children of foreign personnel located in Shanghai, China, with grades preschool to high school (ages 2 to 18). Founded in 1995 under the name École Française de Shanghai (EFS), it is currently affiliated with the Agency for French Education Abroad (AEFE) as a contracted school (conventionné).

The school is governed by the Association des Parents d'Élèves du Lycée Français de Shanghai.

Shanghai French School belongs to the AEFE (Agency for French Teaching Abroad) network. It is an international nonprofit school which welcomes over 1530 students of more than 60 nationalities, from Pre-kindergarten to the French Baccalaureate (from 2 to 18 years old) on its Qingpu and Yangpu campuses.

School Type : International School

Established : 1995

Campuses in Shanghai : 2 campuses (Qingpu and Yangpu )}

Grades Offered : Pre-K to Grade 12

Primary Language : French, English, and Chinese.

Languages Taught ：French, English and Chinese; German or Spanish taught from Grade 7

Terms ：2 terms. September to January, January to June.

Student Age ：2-18

Number of Students ：1450

Student/Teacher Ratio ：1:9

Class Size ：15

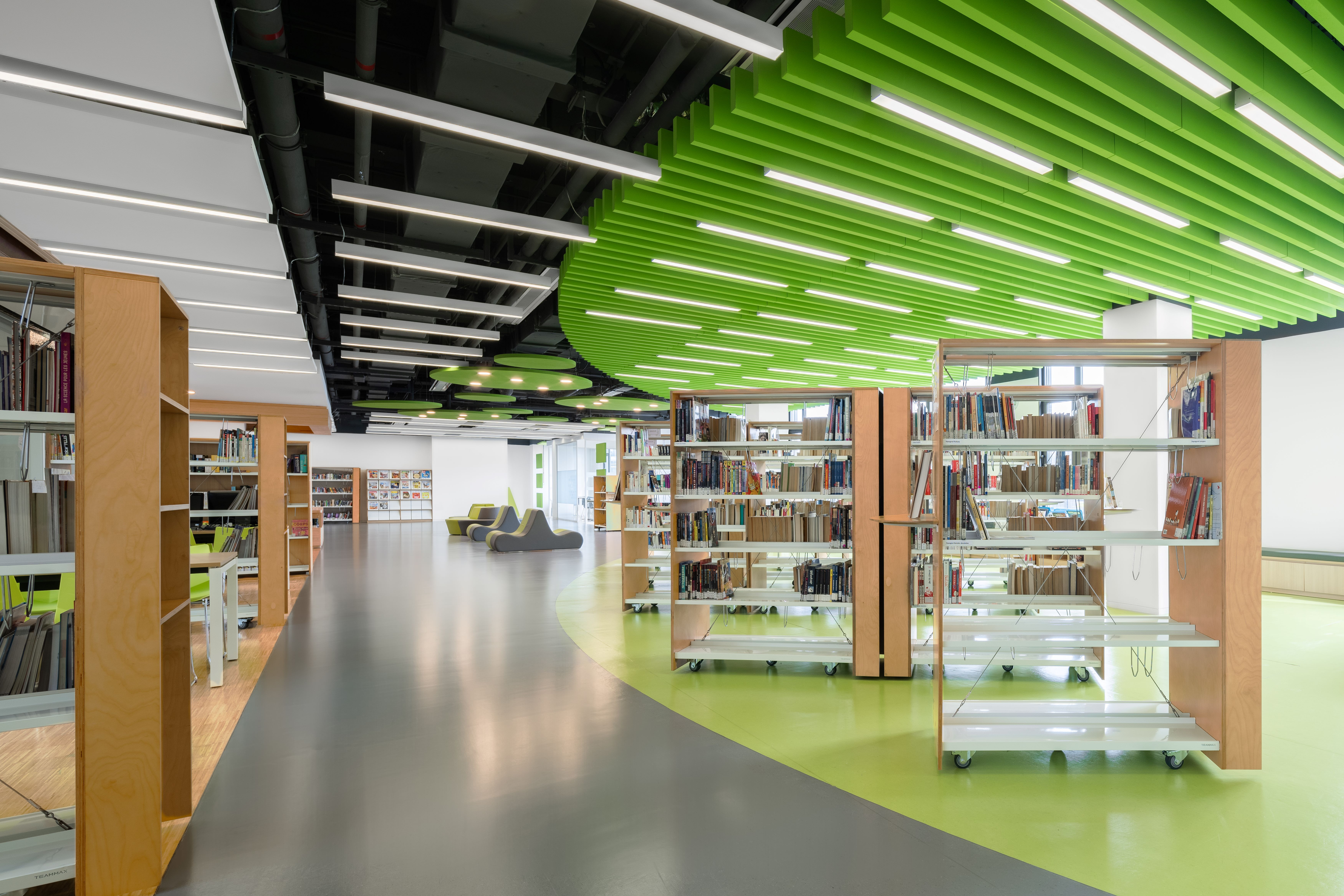

== History ==
Formerly the École Française de Shanghai, it was established in 1995 as an elementary through high school in Changning District, adjacent to the Xijiao State Guest Hotel. The initial enrollment was 13. The German School Shanghai and Lycée Français de Shanghai began collaborating and having a common campus circa 1997, and around that same time the school began its relationship with the AEFE. The Qingpu campus opened in 2005, and the Yangpu campus opened in 2019.

Formerly there was a Pudong campus, on the property of the Shanghai Gold Apple Bilingual School. The Yangpu campus replaced the Pudong campus.

The school became a testing center for Cambridge examinations in 2017.

The school placed rank #10 in the 2024 Concours Général des Lycées et des Métiers.

== Trilingual Education ==
The school provides trilingual education from kindergarten, with French, Chinese and English included as compulsory languages. It is part of the AEFE network, which is described as comprising approximately 580 schools worldwide and facilitating educational continuity for internationally mobile families. The school offers several educational streams with different language emphases, including English-focused programmes (SIA and SEA), Chinese-focused programmes (SIC and SOC), and a French-focused General Stream.

The BFI (Baccalauréat Français International) is designed for students who choose one of two international language streams: the SIA (American International Section stream) or the SIC (Chinese International Section stream). These students take some subjects—such as language and literature, History, Geography, or World Knowledge—in English or Chinese. Throughout the year, they also attend additional classes tailored to their language stream, preparing them to sit exams in the chosen language for those subjects.

== Eurocampuses ==
Shared with the German School (DSS), Qingpu and Yangpu campuses span 50,000+ m^{2}, featuring state-of-the-art facilities, such as theater halls, gyms, stadiums, and 25-meter swimming pools.

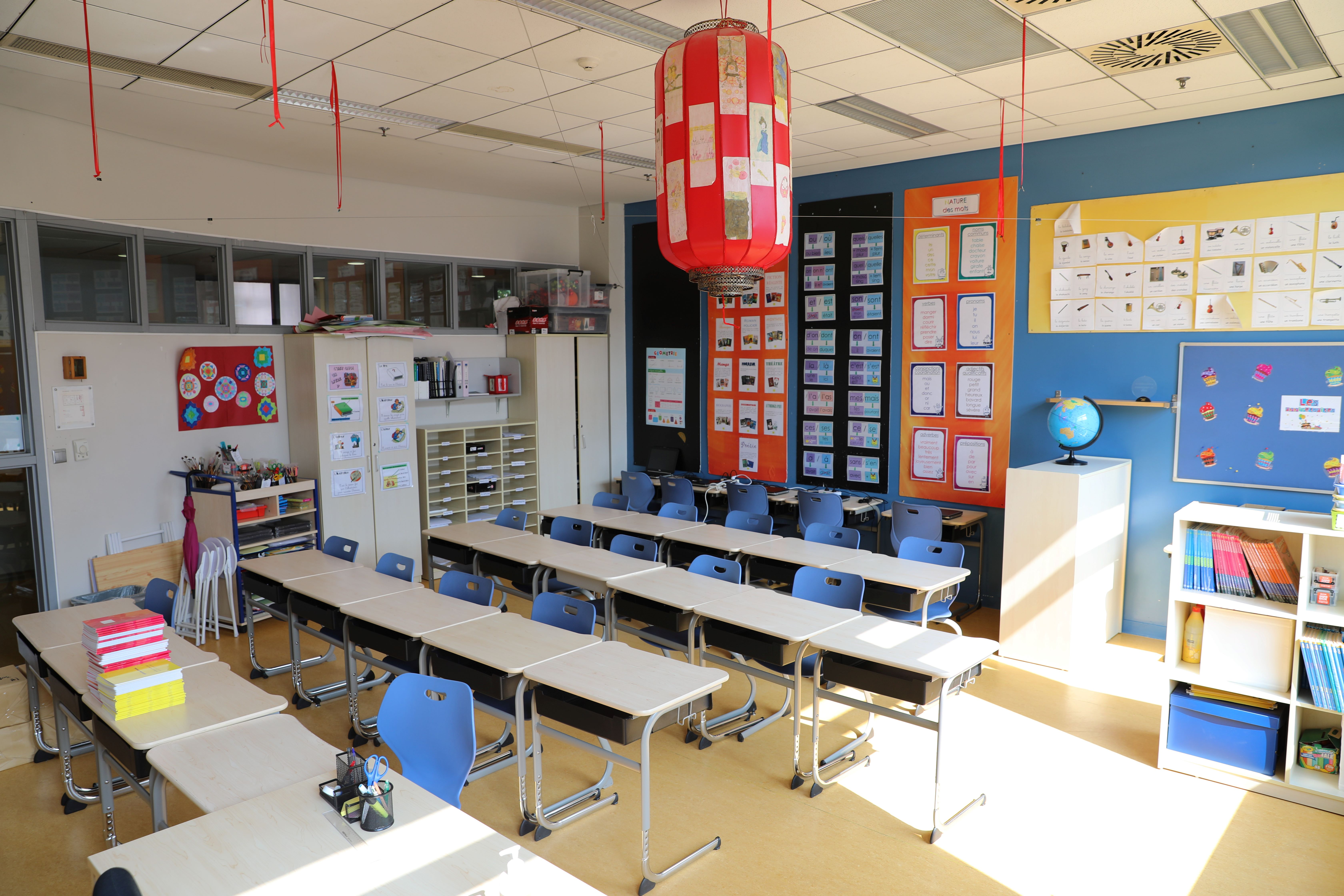
Shanghai French School Primary classroom

== French Baccalauréat ==
The French Baccalaureate is a rigorous, internationally recognized secondary education program that prepares students for higher education worldwide, including in the United States, the United Kingdom, Canada, Australia, and across Europe. It is comparable to other internationally recognized qualifications such as the International Baccalaureate (IB), A-Levels, or Advanced Placement (AP) programs. In France, the Baccalaureate also provides an advantage when applying to prestigious institutions.

The program spans the final two years of secondary education and allows students to specialize by selecting three main subjects, while continuing to follow a balanced core curriculum. It is known for fostering critical thinking and academic rigor. Assessment combines continuous evaluation with final written and oral examinations, providing a comprehensive measure of students' abilities. Compared with other secondary school diplomas, the Baccalaureate places greater emphasis on language proficiency as a graduation requirement.

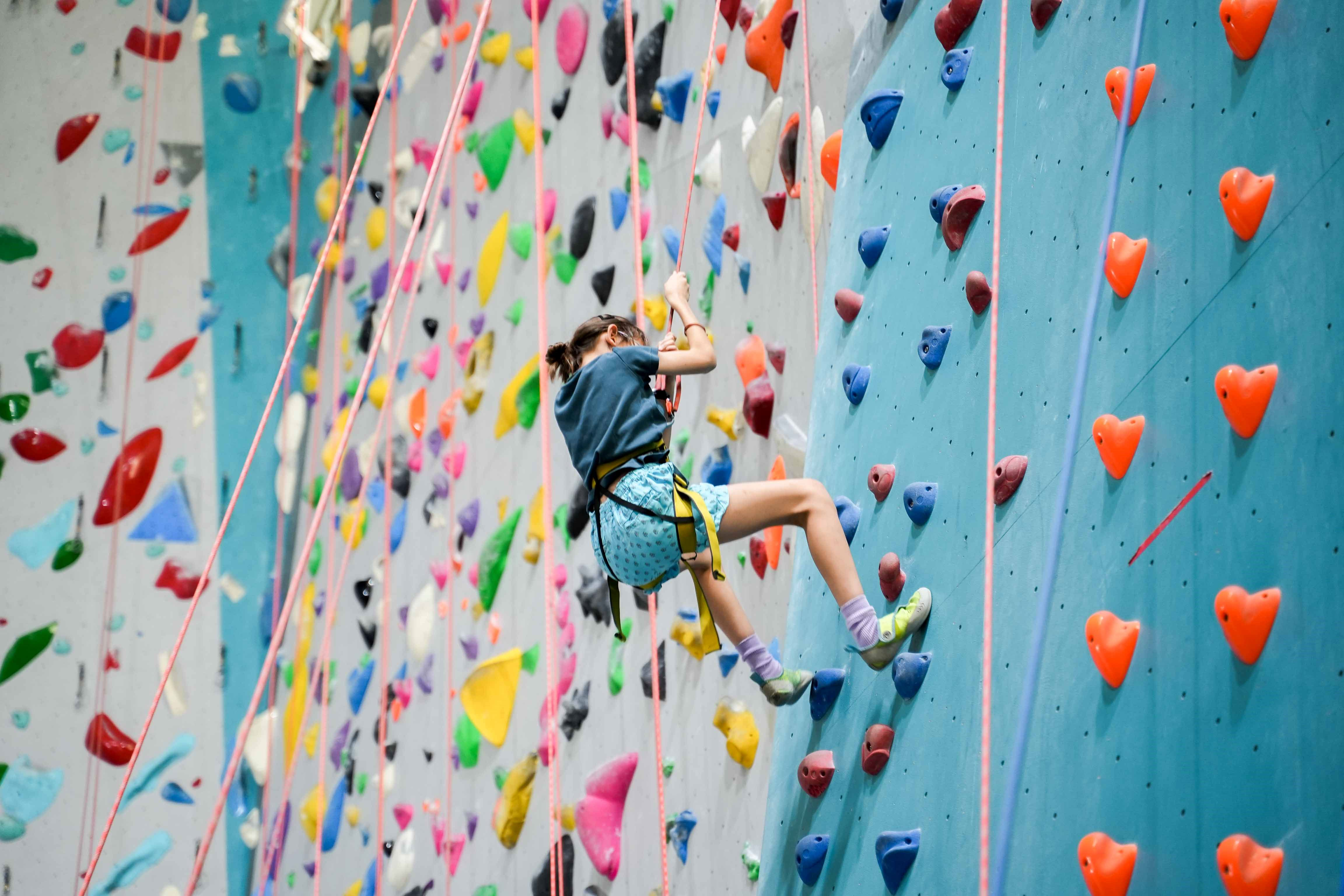

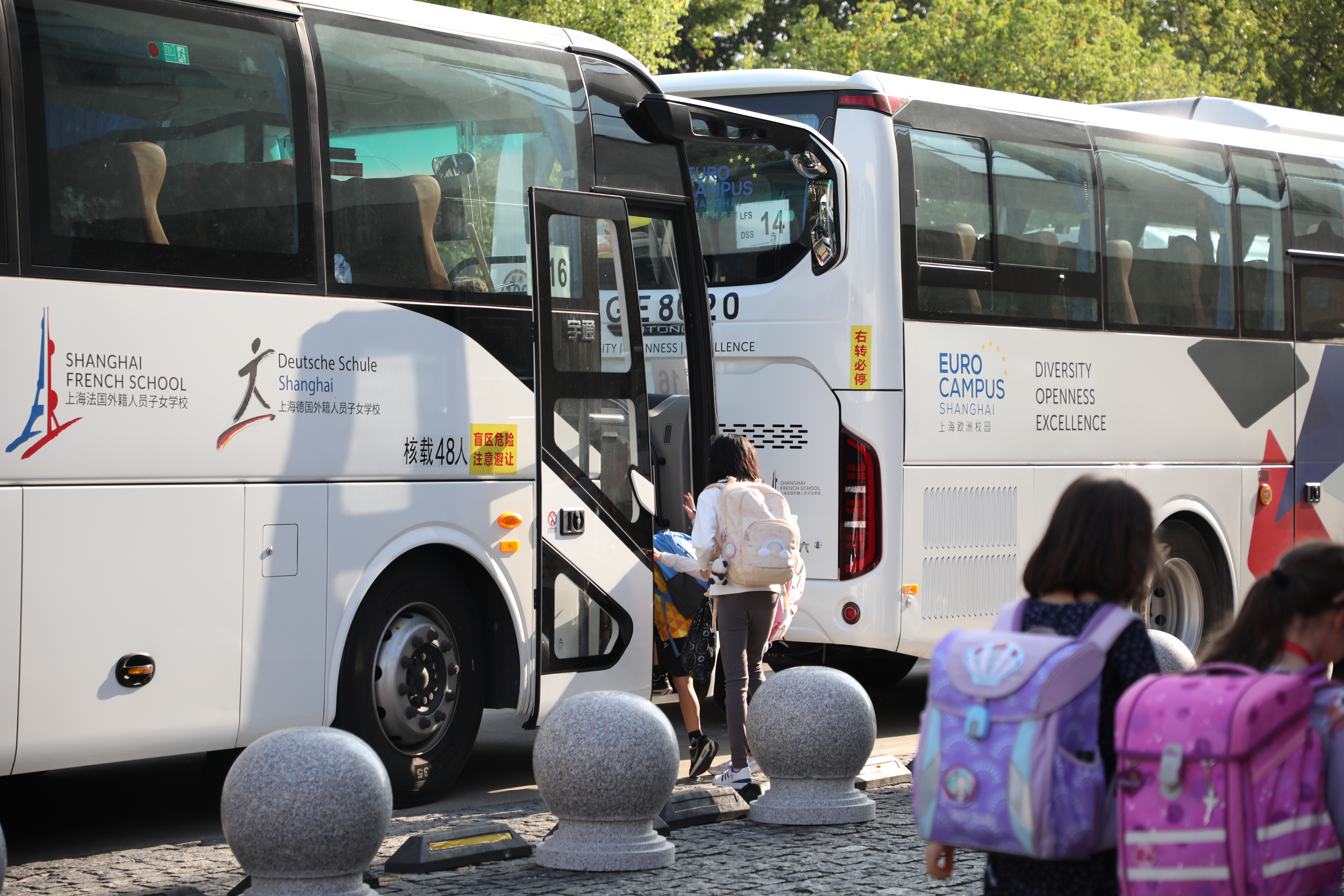

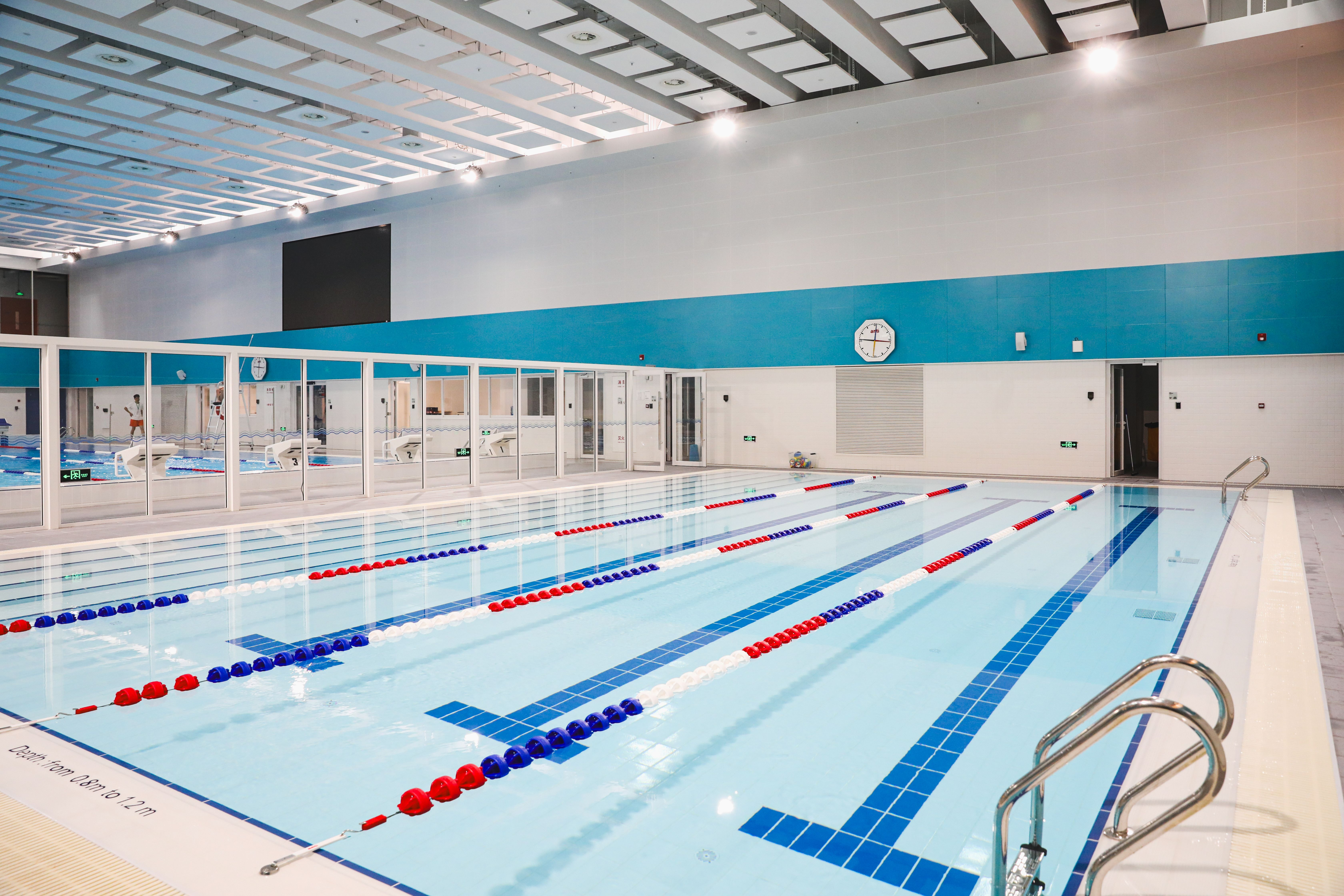

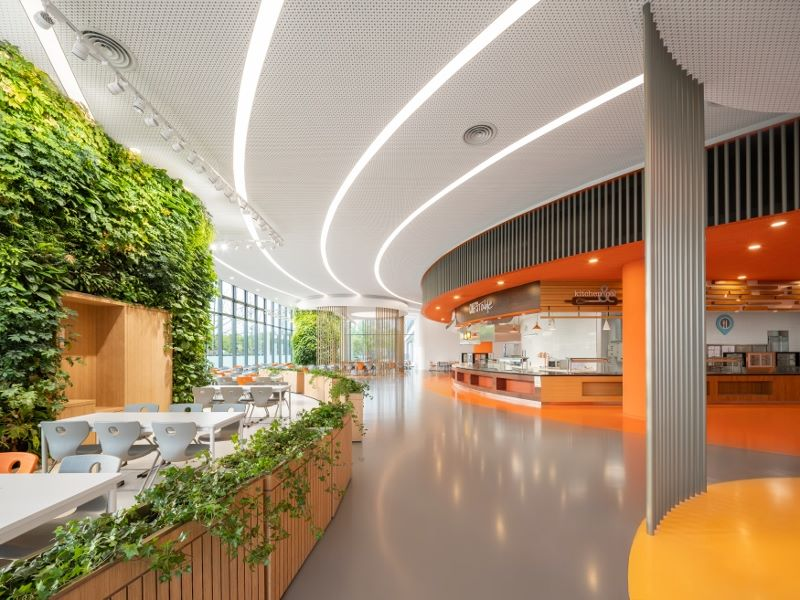

== Non-native families embracing French education ==
The French as Language of Instruction (FLSco) program at Shanghai French School is designed to support students whose first language is not French, enabling them to integrate into the French education system. The program is available from K3 onwards and prepares students for the language and academic requirements of the standard curriculum. Many non-French-speaking students currently enrolled at the school have participated in the FLSco program.

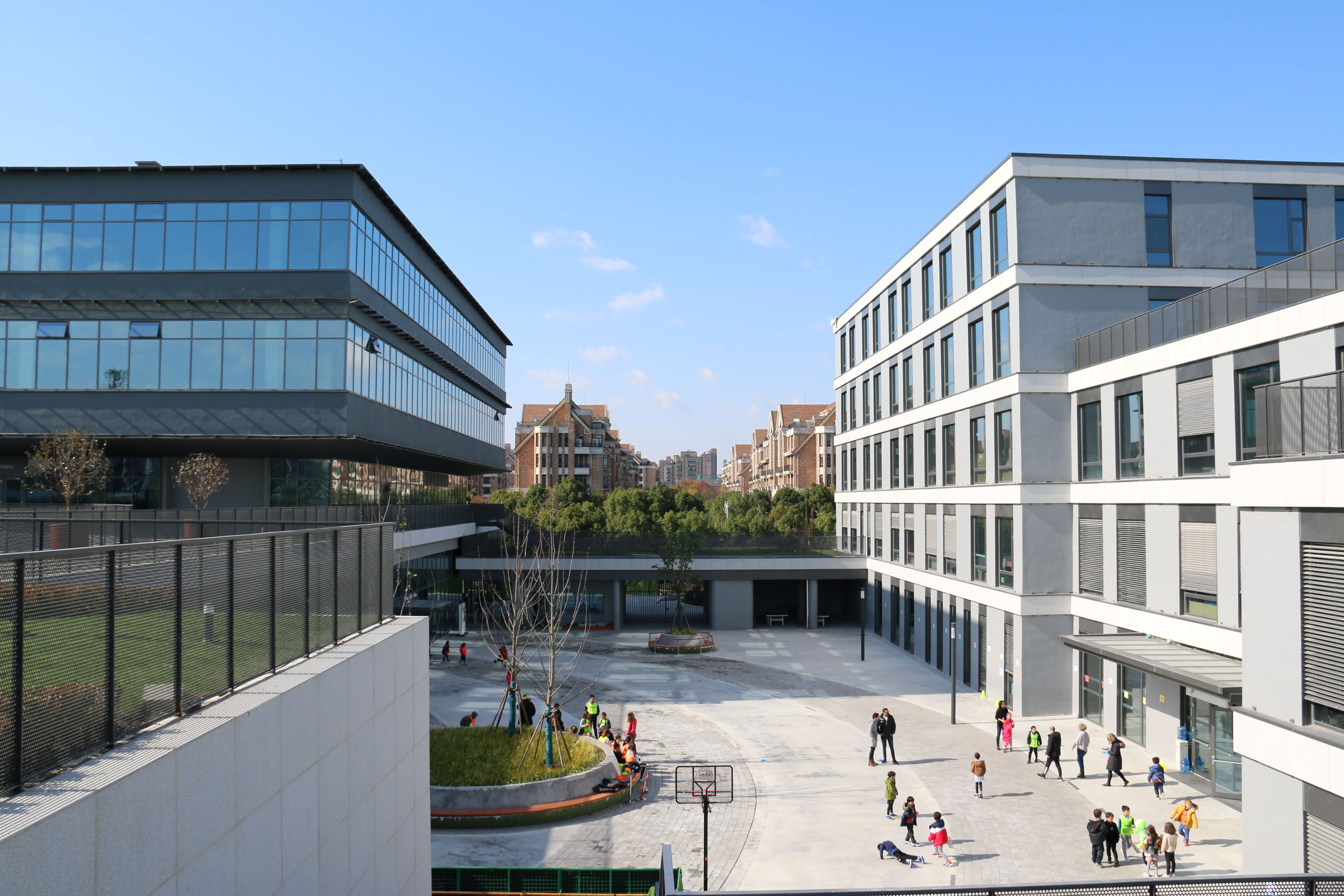

The program generally lasts two years and provides students with the foundational skills necessary to access the mainstream curriculum.

== See also ==
Other French international schools in the PRC

- Lycée Français International de Pékin (Beijing)
- École Française Internationale de Canton (Guangzhou)
- French International School of Hong Kong
- Shekou International School French section
