= Logic File System =

The Logic File System is a research file system which replaces pathnames with expressions in propositional logic. It allows file metadata to be queried with a superset of the Boolean syntax commonly used in modern search engines.

The actual name is the Logic Information Systems File System, and is abbreviated LISFS to avoid confusion with the log-structured file system (LFS). An implementation of the Logic File System is available at the LISFS website.

It is intended to be used on Unix-like operating systems and is a bit difficult to install, as it needs several non-standard OCaml modules.
