= The Divine Comedy (disambiguation) =

The Divine Comedy is an epic poem by Dante Alighieri.

Divine Comedy or The Divine Comedy may also refer to:

- Divine Comedy, a closet screenplay written by Haruhiko Arai, based on Onishi's novel
- Divine Comedy, a novel written by Kyojin Onishi
- The Divine Comedy (band), a band from Northern Ireland
- The Divine Comedy (film), a 1991 Portuguese drama film directed by Manoel de Oliveira
- The Divine Comedy (Ai Weiwei album), 2013
- The Divine Comedy (Milla Jovovich album), 1994
- The Divine Comedy (Smith), a symphony for concert band by Robert W. Smith
