= Journal of Bioscience and Bioengineering =

- Discipline: Biotechnology
- Language: English
- Edited by: Junichi Kato

Publication details
- Former names: Jouzougaku Zasshi (醸造學雜誌) (1923-1943); Hakkoukougaku Zasshi (醗酵工學雑誌) (1944-1972); Journal of Fermentation Technology (1973-1988); Journal of Fermentation and Bioengineering (1989-1998)
- History: 1923–present
- Publisher: Elsevier (outside Japan) and the Society for Biotechnology, Japan (Japan)
- Frequency: monthly
- Impact factor: 2.240 (2016)

Standard abbreviations
- ISO 4: J. Biosci. Bioeng.

Indexing
- CODEN: JBBIF6
- ISSN: 1389-1723 (print); 1347-4421 (web)
- LCCN: 99038028
- OCLC no.: 961275406

Links
- Journal homepage; Journal homepage (Elesvier)

The Journal of Bioscience and Bioengineering is a monthly peer-reviewed scientific journal. The editor-in-chief is Noriho Kamiya (Kyushu University). It is published by The Society for Biotechnology, Japan and distributed outside Japan by Elsevier. It was founded in 1923 as a Japanese-language journal and took its current title in 1999.

== Abstracting and indexing ==
The journal is abstracted and indexed in:

- Chemical Abstracts Service
- EBSCO databases
- EI Compendex
- Inspec
- Medline
- Science Citation Index Expanded
- Scopus

According to the Journal Citation Reports, the journal has a 2017 impact factor of 2.0.15.
