= Susenji Station =

Railway station in Fukuoka, Japan

JK 05 Susenji Station 周船寺駅
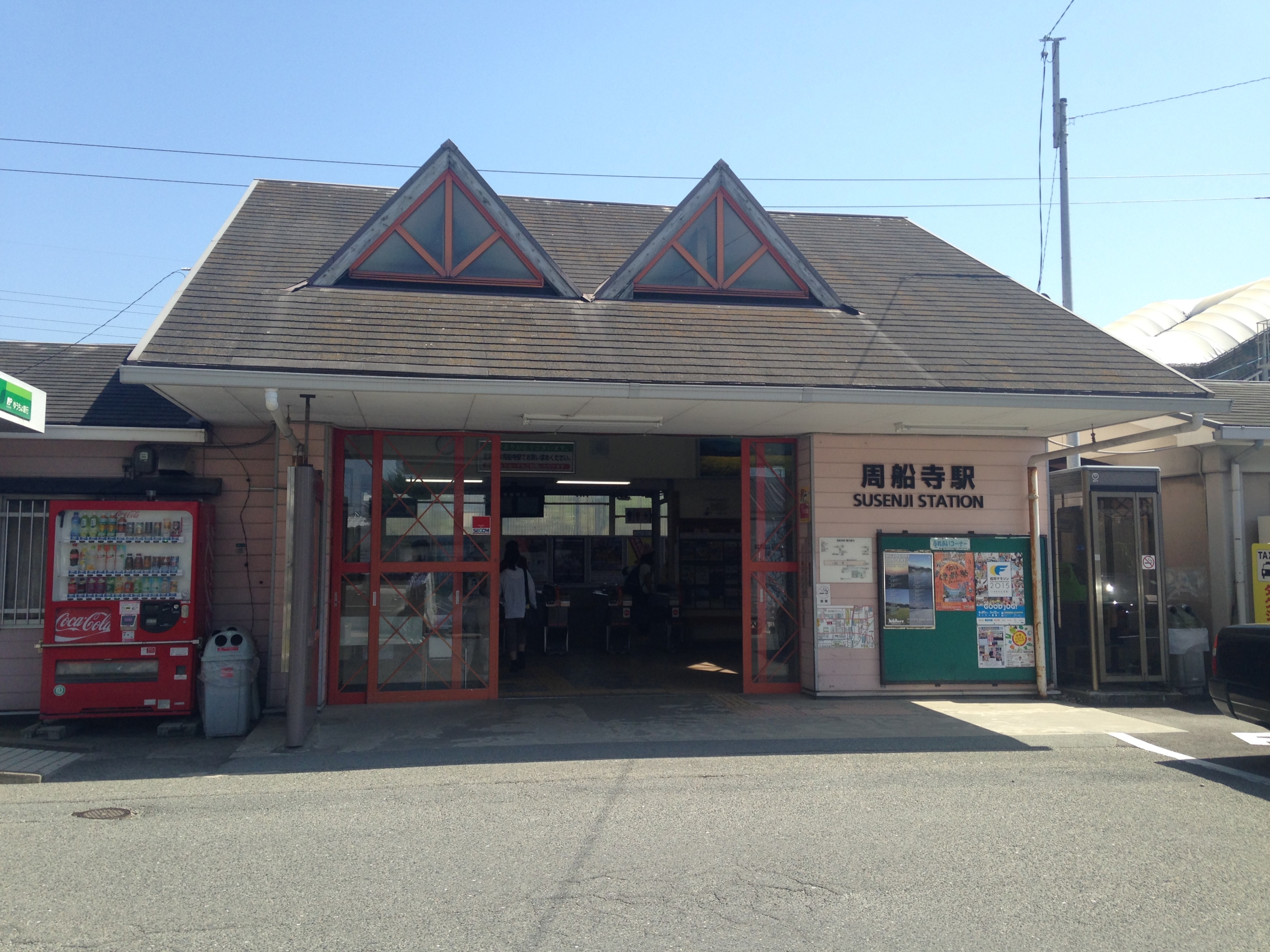
- Susenji Station in 2015

General information
- Location: 1-chōme-1 Susenji, Nishi-ku, Fukuoka-shi, Fukuoka-ken 819-0373; Japan
- Coordinates: 33°34′14″N 130°14′44″E
- Operator: JR Kyushu
- Line: JK Chikuhi Line
- Distance: 8.1 km from Meinohama
- Platforms: 1 island platform
- Tracks: 2

Construction
- Structure type: At grade
- Accessible: Yes - access to platform by footbridge served by elevators

Other information
- Status: Staffed ticket window (Midori no Madoguchi) (outsourced)
- Website: Official website

History
- Opened: 15 April 1925; 101 years ago

Passengers
- FY2020: 3946 daily
- Rank: 42nd (among JR Kyushu stations)

Services
| Preceding station | JR Kyushu | Following station |
|---|---|---|
| Hatae towards Nishi-Karatsu | Chikuhi Line Local | Kyūdai-Gakkentoshi towards Meinohama |
Location
- Location within Fukuoka Prefecture Location within Japan

Susenji Station (周船寺駅, Susenji-eki) is a passenger railway station located in Susenji 1-chome, Nishi-ku, Fukuoka City, Fukuoka Prefecture, Japan. It is operated by JR Kyushu.

== Lines ==
The station is served by the Chikuhi Line and is located 8.1 km from the starting point of the line at Meinohama. Local and weekday rapid services on the Chikuhi Line stop at this station.

== Station layout ==
The station consists of an island platform serving two tracks. The station building is a wooden structure of western design and houses a waiting area and a staffed ticket window. Access to the opposite side platform is by means of a footbridge and a pair of elevators, one that takes you to the top of the footbridge and another to bring you down to the platform.

Management of the station has been outsourced to the JR Kyushu Tetsudou Eigyou Co., a wholly owned subsidiary of JR Kyushu specialising in station services. It staffs the ticket counter which is equipped with a Midori no Madoguchi facility.

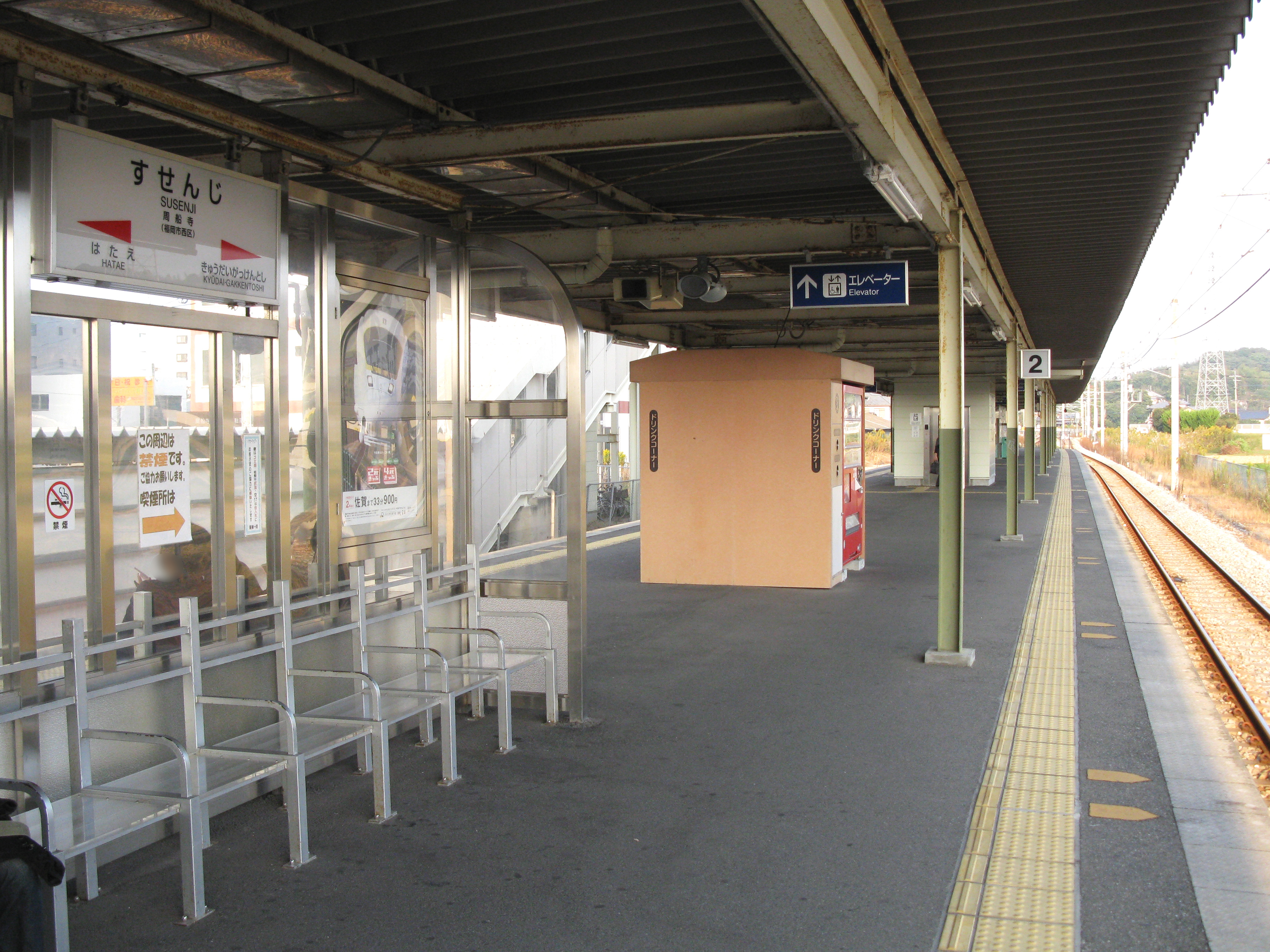
A view of the island platform. Note the elevator shaft in the distance.

=== Platforms ===
| 1 | ■ JK Chikuhi Line | for Meinohama, Tenjin, Hakata, Fukuoka Airport |
| 2 | ■ JK Chikuhi Line | for Chikuzen-Maebaru, Chikuzen-Fukae, Karatsu and Nishi-Karatsu |

== History ==
The private Kitakyushu Railway had opened a track between Fukuyoshi and Hamasaki on 5 December 1923. By 1 April 1924, the line had been extended eastwards to Chikuzen-Maebaru. In the third phase of expansion, the line was extended further east with Meinohama opening as the new eastern terminus on 15 April 1925. On the same day, Susenji was opened as an intermediate station on the new track. When the Kitakyushu Railway was nationalized on 1 October 1937, Japanese Government Railways (JGR) took over control of the station and designated the line which served it as the Chikuhi Line. With the privatization of Japanese National Railways (JNR), the successor of JGR, on 1 April 1987, control of the station passed to JR Kyushu.

== Passenger statistics ==
In fiscal 2020, the station was used by an average of 3946 passengers daily (boarding passengers only), and it ranked 42nd among the busiest stations of JR Kyushu.

== Surrounding area ==
- Japan National Route 202
- Marukumayama Kofun
- Kyushu University Ito Campus
- Chikuzen High School

== See also ==
- List of railway stations in Japan
