= Naotaka Shinfuku =

Japanese psychiatrist (born 1942)

Naotaka Shinfuku is a Japanese psychiatrist recognized for his significant contributions to the field of mental health, particularly in Asia. He is known for his work in community mental health, disaster mental health, psychotropic prescription patterns, and the history of mental health services in Japan.

Naotaka Shinfuku was the founding President of the Asian Federation of Psychiatric Associations (AFPA) and initiated the Research on Asian Psychotropic Prescription Pattern (REAP).

== Early life and education ==
Naotaka Shinfuku was born in 1942 in Kaohsiung, Taiwan, where his father, Naotake Shinfuku, a military psychiatrist, was stationed there during Japanese occupation. The family returned to Japan when Naotaka was four years old. He pursued his medical degree at Kyusyu University in Fukuoka, graduating in 1967. Shinfuku specialized in psychiatry at the Hizen National Sanatorium in Saga Prefecture and furthered his studies in Paris, France, focusing on social psychiatry and community mental health.

== Career and works ==
Shinfuku began his significant career trajectory by joining the Ministry of Health and Labor in Japan in 1979 as Deputy Director of the National Sanatorium Department. In 1981, he became the Regional Adviser on Mental Health and Drug Dependence or the Western Pacific Office of the World Health Organization (WHO), a role he held for 13 years. During his tenure at WHO, he initiated numerous programs to enhance community mental health services and address psychosocial issues in Asia-Pacific. He left WHO in 1994 and returned Japan.

From 1994 to 2005, Shinfuku was a professor at Kobe University School of Medicine's International Centre for Medical Research. There, he experienced and observed the psychosocial impact of the 1995 Great Hanshin Awaji Earthquake. He also initiated major international psychiatric research projects in Asia, including the long-running Research on Asian Psychotropic Prescription Pattern (REAP) study.

In 2005, Shinfuku was elected as the Founding President of the Asian Federation of Psychiatric Associations (AFPA) and as the World Psychiatric Association's Zonal Representative for East Asia. He has played a key role in promoting international collaboration in psychiatric research and training across Asia through these organizations.

== Research ==
Shinfuku's research has focused on areas such as disaster mental health, psychotropic prescribing patterns, the history of mental health services in Japan religion and psychotherapy and urban mental health issues like social isolation and hikikomori He has been a strong advocate for developing community-based mental health services in Asia as an alternative to hospital-centric models.

Through his leadership roles in WHO, WPA, and AFPA, Shinfuku has had a profound influence on the development of psychiatry and mental health services across the Asia-Pacific region over the past four decades. He is widely regarded as one of the most prominent and influential psychiatrists in Asia.

== Honors and awards ==
- 1991: Honorary Consultant, Institute of Mental Health, Peking University, Beijing, China.
- 2009: Award for Contribution to Asian Psychiatry, Japan Society of Transcultural, Tokyo, Japan.
- 2014: Lifetime Achievement Award, Asian Federation of Psychiatric Associations, Kuala Lumpur, Malaysia.

== Personal life ==
Shinfuku currently lives in Fukuoka Japan. He has two sons and a daughter.
