= Google Cloud (disambiguation) =

Google Cloud refers to the Google Cloud Platform or other past and present cloud-computing services including:

== Current ==
- Google Cloud Datastore, a NoSQL database service
- Google Cloud Storage, AKA Google Storage, a file-storage Web service

== Discontinued ==
- Google Cloud Connect, a former plug-in to synchronize Microsoft Office documents to Google Docs
- Google Cloud Messaging, a former mobile notification service
- Google Cloud Print, a service that lets users print from any device within a network cloud

== See also ==
- Google Docs Editors
- Google Drive
- Google Workspace, a suite of productivity tools offered by Google
- IBM/Google Cloud Computing University Initiative
