= Lehrmann =

Lehrmann is a surname. Notable people with the surname include:

- Bruce Lehrmann (born 1995), Australian political staffer
- Carl Valentin Lehrmann (born 1992), Danish politician
- Debra Lehrmann (born 1956), American judge
- Julius Lehrmann (1885–1962), Danish sports shooter
- Karl Lehrmann (1887–1957), Austrian architect and art professor

== See also ==
- Lehrman (disambiguation)
- Lerman (disambiguation)
