= Content curation =

Information and item gathering

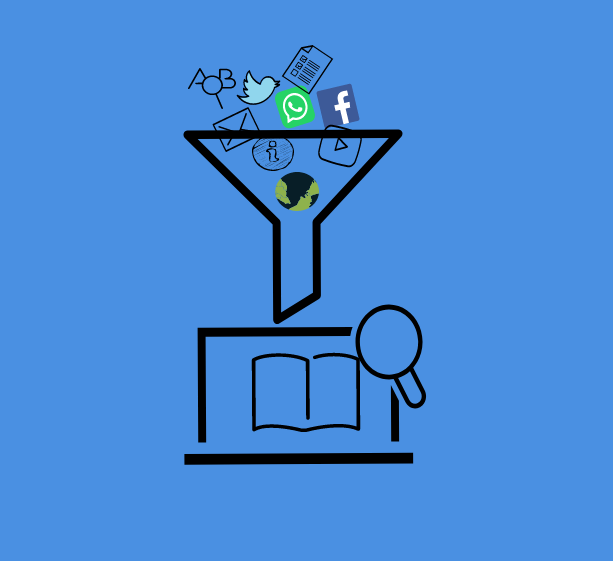
Content curation

Content curation is the process of gathering information relevant to a particular topic or area of interest, usually with the intention of adding value through the process of selection, organization, and maintenance of the items in a collection or exhibition. Services or people that implement content curation are called curators. Curation services can be used by businesses as well as end users.

== Concept ==
Museums and galleries have curators to select and interpret items for collection and display. There are also curators in the world of media, for instance DJs of radio stations tasked with selecting songs to be played over the air.

== Methods ==
Content curation can be carried out either manually or automatically or by a combination of them. In the first case, it's done by specially designated curators. In the second case, it's done using one or more of the following:

- Collaborative filtering
- Semantic analysis
- Social rating

=== Collaborative filtering ===
Collaborative filtering is a method of forecasting often used in recommendation systems. This principle is based on the axiom that evaluations made by users in the past are predictive of evaluations that they will make in the future.

Collaborative filtering can either be based on votes and views of a given social community, as it's done on Reddit and Digg, or the end user's own prior activity, as it's done on YouTube and Amazon.

=== Semantic analysis ===
Semantic analysis examines the relationship between the various elements and sources of information found in a given document. The system compares some of the factors or all the information sources topics and terms. This method uses the principles of factor analysis to analyze relationships between the studied phenomena and objects.

This approach has been successfully implemented by services like Stumbleupon, which break up content according to topic, subtopic, and category. Trapit uses semantic analysis in combination with user feedback and AI technology to refine content selections for its users.

=== Social rating ===
This method employs user ratings and recommendations to select content. The system finds someone with interests similar to the end user and bases its recommendations on their activity. This method of selection is widely used on social sites such as Facebook and Flipboard.

Parameters for determining the social ranking are generally based on actions such as shares, votes, likes, etc., keeping in mind the time that these activities are carried out once the content is published. The more there are such activities in a shorter time, the higher rating this content gets.

"Social curation" services like Pinterest allow users to share and discuss their curated collections of found content.

== See also ==
- Content (media)
- Digital curation
- Storify
- Pearltrees
- Trapit
- Declara
- Scoop.it
