= 100 Grad Festival =

Theatre festival in Berlin, Germany

Coordinates: 52°30′2″N 13°23′56″E

100 Grad Festival was a non-curated theatre festival in Berlin, Germany. In 2015 the festival was replaced with the Performing Arts Festival.
