= Kuato =

Kuato may refer to:

- Kuato, a character in Total Recall (1990 film)
- Kuato, a fictional entity in Rick and Morty season 7
- Kuato Studios, a game development spin-off of CALO
