= Christopher Savoie =

American-Japanese entrepreneur, scientist, and lawyer (born 1971)

Dr. Christopher Savoie
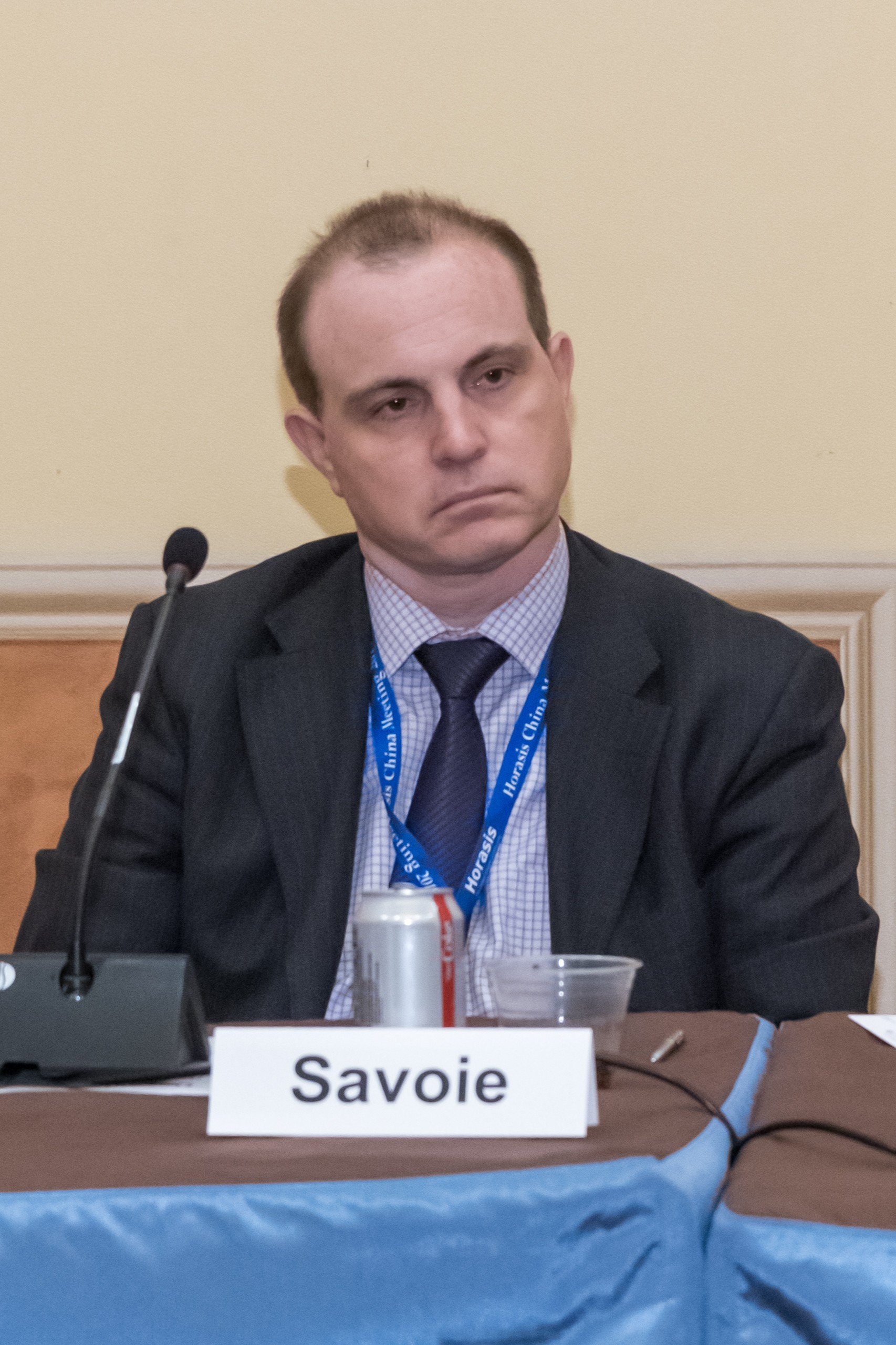
- Savoie in 2019
- Born: January 19, 1971 (age 55); Warwick, Rhode Island
- Citizenship: United States; Japan
- Occupations: Entrepreneur, scientist, lawyer
- Known for: Co-inventor of natural language technology that contributed to the development of Siri

Christopher Savoie (born January 19, 1971) is an American-Japanese entrepreneur, scientist, and lawyer. He has co-founded or led multiple ventures including Dejima Inc., Gene Networks International (GNI), Kyulux, and Zapata Computing, with work spanning computational biology, natural-language systems, quantum algorithms, and industrial agentic AI. He is currently the co-founder and CEO of SiC Systems. During his time at Dejima, his patented work on artificial intelligence with Babak Hodjat led to the technology used by Apple for their digital assistant Siri.

== Career ==
=== Informatics and early ventures ===
As a student in Japan, Savoie worked across computational biology and informatics, publishing on peptide motif inference in immunology and applying machine learning to epitope prediction. He also contributed to work on peptide-binding groove dynamics. Savoie established early web consultancies including Atmark and Webula during the dot-com boom.

=== Dejima and natural-language systems ===
In 1998, Savoie co-founded Dejima Inc. with Babak Hodjat and Makoto Amamiya to develop adaptive, agent-oriented architectures for natural-language interfaces. The Adaptive Agent Oriented Software Architecture (AAOSA) approach that Savoie invented with Hodjat at Dejima was later used by Apple as the natural language interface in their digital assistant Siri.

=== Gene Networks International (GNI) ===
In 2001, Savoie co-founded Gene Networks International (GNI) based on his research on the application of Bayesian machine learning for systems pharmacology and drug design. Savoie served as the CEO and led the company through an IPO on the Tokyo Stock Exchange on August 31, 2007. As of December 13th, 2025, GNI Group Ltd. has a market cap of $880M.

=== Nissan ===
Savoie later served as Senior Manager of Enterprise Architecture at Nissan, where he worked on big-data analytics and AI for global processes.

=== Kyulux ===
In 2015, Savoie co-founded and served as CEO at Kyulux. The company applied machine learning methods to identify light-emitting molecules that require less energy to emit colored light for OLED displays.

=== Zapata Computing ===
In 2023, Zapata rebranded as Zapata AI with a focus on developing quantum-inspired generative AI applications for industrial-scale problems. In April 2024, Zapata AI became a public company listed on the NASDAQ stock exchange through a business combination with Andretti Acquisition Corp., a SPAC created by Michael Andretti. In October 2024, the company announced it was ceasing operations. In September 2025, the company announced a restart as Zapata Quantum, with a renewed focus on developing quantum computing software applications for enterprise use cases.

=== SiC Systems ===
In 2025, Savoie co-founded SiC Systems together with Seyed Soheil Mansouri, a professor of systems design at the Technical University of Denmark. The company is a Nashville-based venture applying agentic AI to complex manufacturing .

== Policy and legal roles ==
Savoie has served on the steering committee of the U.S. Quantum Economic Development Consortium (QED-C). In 2023, he was named QED-C Quantum Law Chair. He has also served as vice chair of the Big Data committee of the American Bar Association.

== Honors and awards ==
- 1999 MIT Technology Review Innovators Under 35

== Selected patents and publications ==
Patents

- US US6594684B1, Hodjat, Babak; Savoie, Christopher J.; Amamiya, Makoto, "Adaptive agent-oriented software architecture", issued 2000-11-07
- US US6144989, Hodjat, Babak; Savoie, Christopher J.; Amamiya, Makoto, "Adaptive interaction using an adaptive agent-oriented software architecture", issued 2003-07-15
- US US6772190B2, Hodjat, Babak; Savoie, Christopher J.; Amamiya, Makoto, "Distributed parser of natural language input", issued 2004-08-03
- US US7430475B2, Imoto, Seiyo; Goto, Takao; Miyano, Satoru; Tashiro, Kosuke; De Hoon, Michiel; Savoie, Christopher J.; Kuhara, Saturo, "Biological discovery using gene regulatory networks generated from multiple-disruption expression libraries", issued 2008-09-30
- US US7761499B2, Hodjat, Babak; Savoie, Christopher J.; Amamiya, Makoto, "System for automated reply to natural language input", issued 2010-07-20

Publications

- Sudo, Tohru; Kamikawaji, Nobuhiro; Kimura, Akinori; Date, Yukiji; Savoie, Christopher; Nakashima, Hisashi; Furuichi, Emiko; Kuhara, Satoru; Sasazuki, Takehiko (1995-11-15). "Differences in MHC class I self peptide repertoires among HLA-A2 subtypes". The Journal of Immunology. 155 (10): 4749–4756.
- Imoto, Seiya; Savoie, Christopher J.; Aburatani, Sachiyo; Kim, Sunyong; Tashiro, Kousuke; Kuhara, Satoru; Miyano, Satoru (2003). "Use of Gene Networks for Identifying and Validating Drug Targets". Journal of Bioinformatics and Computational Biology. 01 (03): 459–474.
- Savoie, Christopher; Aburatani, Sachiyo; Watanabe, Shouji; Eguchi, Yoshihiro; Muta, Shigeru; Imoto, Seiya; Miyano, Satoru; Kuhara, Satoru; Tashiro, Kosuke (2003-01-01). "Use of Gene Networks from Full Genome Microarray Libraries to Identify Functionally Relevant Drug-affected Genes and Gene Regulation Cascades". DNA Research. 10 (1): 19–25.
- Hurley, Daniel; Araki, Hiromitsu; Tamada, Yoshinori; Dunmore, Ben; Sanders, Deborah; Humphreys, Sally; Affara, Muna; Imoto, Seiya; Yasuda, Kaori; Tomiyasu, Yuki; Tashiro, Kosuke; Savoie, Christopher; Cho, Vicky; Smith, Stephen; Kuhara, Satoru; Miyano, Satoru; Charnock-Jones, D. Stephen; Crampin, Edmund J.; Print, Cristin G. (2012). "Gene network inference and visualization tools for biologists: application to new human transcriptome datasets". Nucleic Acids Research. 40 (6): 2377–2398.
- Kailasanathan, Rajiv; Clements, William R.; Boskabadi, Mohammad Reza; Gibford, Shawn M.; Papadakis, Emmanouil; Savoie, Christopher J.; Mansouri, Seyed Soheil (2025-08-29). "Quantum enhanced ensemble GANs for anomaly detection in continuous biomanufacturing". arXiv.org.
