= Scoop.it =

Marketing company based in San Francisco

- Type: Private company
- Industry: computer programming
- Founded: 2007
- Headquarters: San Francisco, California, USA
- Key people: Guillaume Decugis, CEO, Marc Rougier, President
- Products: content curation service, content marketing software
- Website: scoop.it

Scoop.it is a content marketing software company based in San Francisco, California. The company operates the Scoop.it platform, a content curation service, and markets its content marketing software to businesses.

== History ==
Scoop.it was founded in 2007 as Goojet, a widget platform for mobile phones, by Guillaume Decugis and Marc Rougier. Following the rapid rise of the Apple App Store which made its widget technology redundant, the company changed its strategy to focus on content marketing and rebranded as Scoop.it.

The company launched its current content curation service in private beta at the end of 2010. Before opening to all users as a free service in November 2011. The website enables its users to discover content on their topics of interest that they can curate and publish on their own web page and share on their social networks. The website rapidly grew in popularity, being ranked by Alexa among the top 1,000 websites globally in 2012, and as of July 2013, it had been visited by more than 75 million people, according to VentureBeat. Inbound.org also ranked Scoop.it among the top 50 marketing technology companies in the world.

In July 2013, Scoop.it raised $2.6 million from Partech Ventures, Elaia Partners, Orkos Capital and IXO Private Equity, adding to the $8.5 million raised by Goojet. Since then, the company has launched B2B software products such as its content marketing software launched in 2015.

In October 2018, Scoop.it was acquired by Linkfluence, a social media monitoring provider, and Guillaume Decugis became CEO of the combined entity.

== Use ==
Scoop.it allows you to create an online journal on a specific topic. The user can discover content, curate it and classify it according to the chosen topic. He then looks for keywords that allow him to access information flows present on the web: blog, social networks, etc., via the platform. It is possible to share the information collected on Scoop.it on the various major social networks.

A free user profile can have up to 2 thematic media (topics) or two online newspapers.

== See also ==
- Content marketing
- Content curation
