= Desti =

- Founded: November 2011
- Founder: Nadav Gur (Founder & CEO); Imri Goldberg (Founder & CTO)
- Headquarters: Menlo Park, California
- Products: Personalized guide book
- Parent: SRI International
- Website: www.desti.com

Desti is a travel guide app and a spin-off of SRI International that uses SRI's CALO artificial intelligence technology (the basis for Apple's Siri) to help users plan trips. The app went to public beta in November 2012.

The company's app allows users to search a destination and filter by a variety of categories, and save the result as a collection. Desti was a finalist in the 2013 SXSW Accelerator. As of early 2013, Desti had raised around $2 million in seed funding, primarily from Horizons Ventures.
