= Lehrman =

Lehrman is a surname. Notable people with the surname include:

- Cassidy Lehrman (born 1992), American actress
- Daniel S. Lehrman (1919–1972), American naturalist, animal psychologist, ornithologist and comparative psychologist
- Debra Lehrmann (born 1956), American jurist
- Gregg Lehrman, American composer, music producer and songwriter
- Henry Lehrman (1881–1946), American actor, screenwriter and film director and producer
- Leonard Lehrman (born 1949), American composer
- Lewis Lehrman (1938–2026), American investment banker, historian and former politician
- Robert Lehrman, American novelist, commentator, speechwriter, and teacher

== See also ==
- Lehrmann
- Lerman (disambiguation)
- Gerson Lehrman Group (GLG), founded in 1998 and headquartered in New York City, independent consulting services
- Gilder Lehrman Center for the Study of Slavery, Resistance, and Abolition, Yale University
- Gilder Lehrman Institute of American History, founded in New York in 1994, was set up to promote the study and love of American history
