= Lerman =

Lerman is an Ashkenazi Jewish surname. It may refer to:

- Anita Lerman (born 1944), American politician
- Antony Lerman (born 1946), British writer
- April Lerman (born 1969), American actress
- Bruce Lerman, American cardiologist
- Diego Lerman (born 1976), Argentine film director, producer and screenwriter
- Dragutin Lerman (1863–1918), Croatian explorer
- Eleanor Lerman, American poet, novelist, and short story writer
- Jonathan Lerman (born 1987), American artist
- Kristina Lerman (born 1967), American network scientist
- Leo Lerman (1914–1994), American writer and editor
- Leonard Lerman, American biologist
- Logan Lerman (born 1992), American actor
- Miles Lerman (1920–2008), American activist
- Oscar Lerman (1919–1992), American nightclub and gallery owner, and film producer
- Rhoda Lerman (1936–2015), American author
- Varvara Brilliant-Lerman (1888–1954), Russian plant physiologist

== See also ==
- Lehrman (disambiguation)
