= Kyojin Onishi =

Japanese novelist and critic

Kyojin Onishi (大西 巨人, Ōnishi Kyojin, 1916–2014) was a Japanese novelist and critic. He was born in 1916 in Fukuoka Prefecture and dropped out of Kyushu University. He was a Marxist throughout his life.

== Works ==
- Divine Comedy (novel)

== See also ==
- Shoichi Watanabe – He and Onishi argued about human rights of natural-born handicapped.
