= Declara =

- Company type: Private
- Website type: Knowledge sharing and collaboration platform
- Founded: 2012; 14 years ago
- Founders: Ramona Pierson and Nelson Gonzalez
- CEO: Zak Zielezinski
- Industry: Technology Company
- Website: declara.com
- Launched: February 2012; 14 years ago
- Current status: Active

Declara is a social learning and collaboration technology company based in Palo Alto, California.

== Product ==
Declara's platform is called the Cognitive Graph. It analyses how users interact with data to create a personalized, cognitive learning map based on a user's data, history, and interests. Declara's customers include governments, companies, educational institutions, non-profits, and research organizations that use its platform to collaborate, learn, and solve problems more effectively.

== History ==
Declara was founded in 2012 by Ramona Pierson and Nelson Gonzalez. The inspiration for Declara, Pierson has said, came from her recovery from a 1984 car accident that tore apart her body and put her in a coma for 18 months. When Pierson awoke, she was blind and was forced to relearn how to walk, breathe, and smile. She regained partial sight in her left eye after a successful corneal transplant operation. After the injury, Pierson had to relearn the basic skills. In 2012, She became the co-founder of Declara.

Nelson and Pierson started a company that served as a software simulation of Pierson's mind. With the help of algorithms developed by Pierson and others, including engineers from Google and Microsoft, Declara's system learns how people interact, what types of questions they're looking to answer, and who can provide the best answers.

Declara secured $5 million in early investments, which included the backing of Peter Thiel, the co-founder of PayPal.

In April 2014, Declara raised $16 million in Series A funding, led by GSV Capital, with participation from Data Collective, Founders Fund, and Catamount Ventures. In June 2014, the company secured $9 million in funding from Linden Venture Fund and EDBI, bringing its total Series A funding to $25 million. Declara announced its expansion into Singapore.

Pierson was named to the Business Insider's Silicon Valley 100: The Coolest People in Tech Right Now in March 2014.

== Customers ==
Education Services Australia (ESA), a national, not-for-profit company owned by Australian education ministers, began using the Declara platform in 2013.

In April 2014, Sindicato Nacional de Trabajadores de la Educación (SNTE) — the largest teachers' union in Mexico and Latin America — selected Declara as the technology platform for professional development of its 1.6 million teachers and administrators.

Declara's customers include Genentech, The University of Pennsylvania in the United States and Bécalos, an organization of Mexico's Televisa Foundation.
