= Kyushu University =

University in Fukuoka, Japan

Coordinates: 33.62784°N 130.42297°E

- 九州大学
- Former name: Kyushu Imperial University
- Motto in English: Opening the Door to a New Century of Knowledge
- Type: Public (National)
- Established: Founded 1903, Chartered 1911
- Affiliations: Alliance of Asian Liberal Arts Universities
- Endowment: US$72 Million
- Budget: $1.445 Billion
- President: Tatsuro Ishibashi
- Faculty: 2,110 (As of May 1, 2021)
- Administrative staff: 2,351 (As of May 1, 2020)
- Students: 18,560 (As of May 1, 2022)
- Undergraduates: 11,683
- Postgraduates: 6,877
- Location: Fukuoka, Fukuoka Prefecture, Japan
- Campus: Urban, (2.4 km^{2}) Ito, urban, (0.4 km^{2}) Hakozaki, urban, (0.3 km^{2}) Maidashi, urban, (0.25 km^{2}) Chikushi, urban, (0.063km²) Ohashi, rural, (0.1 km^{2}) Beppu, Research Forests and Farms (72 km^{2})
- Language: Japanese and English
- Colours: Wine Red
- Website: www.kyushu-u.ac.jp/en/

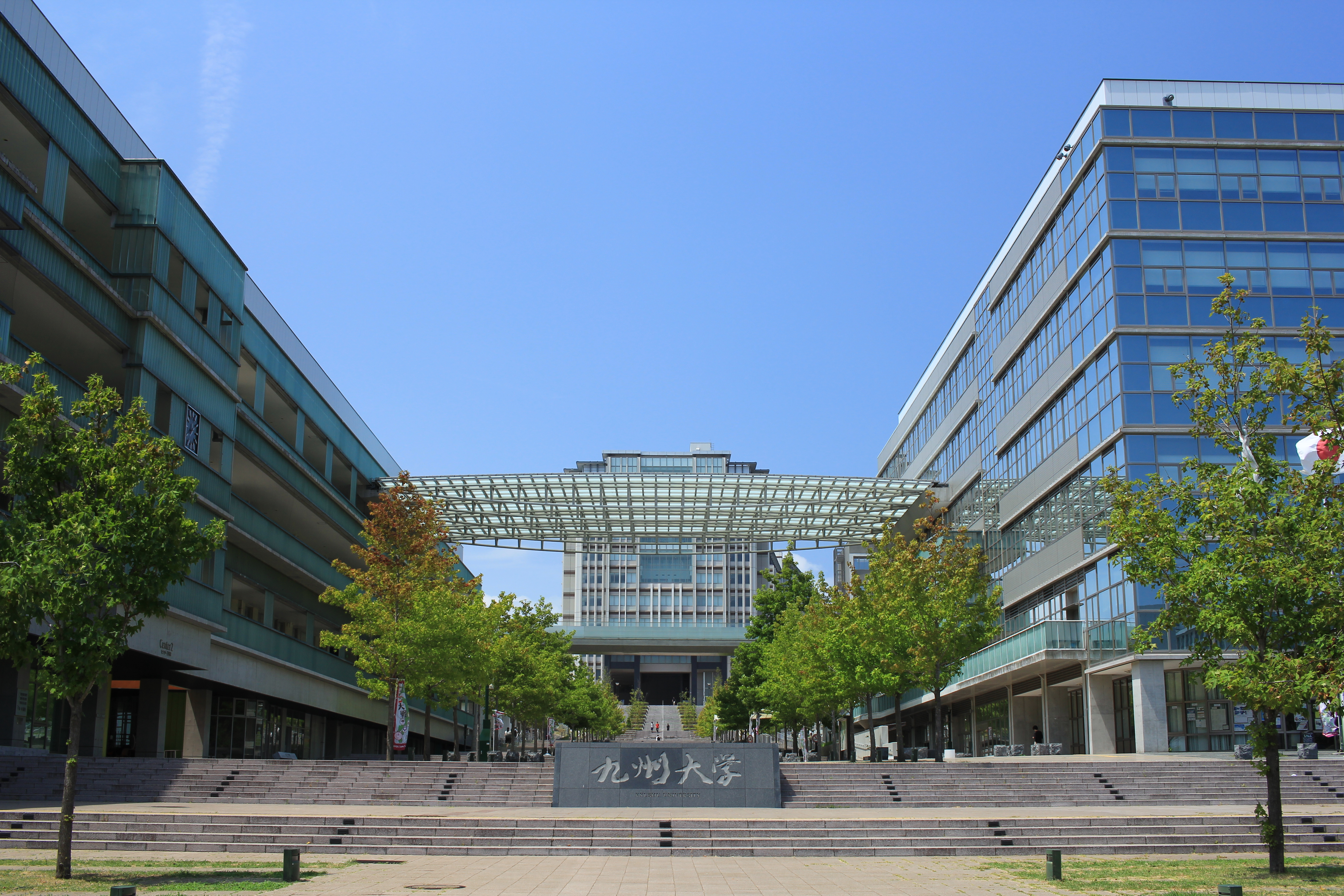
Center Zone Kyushu University Ito Campus

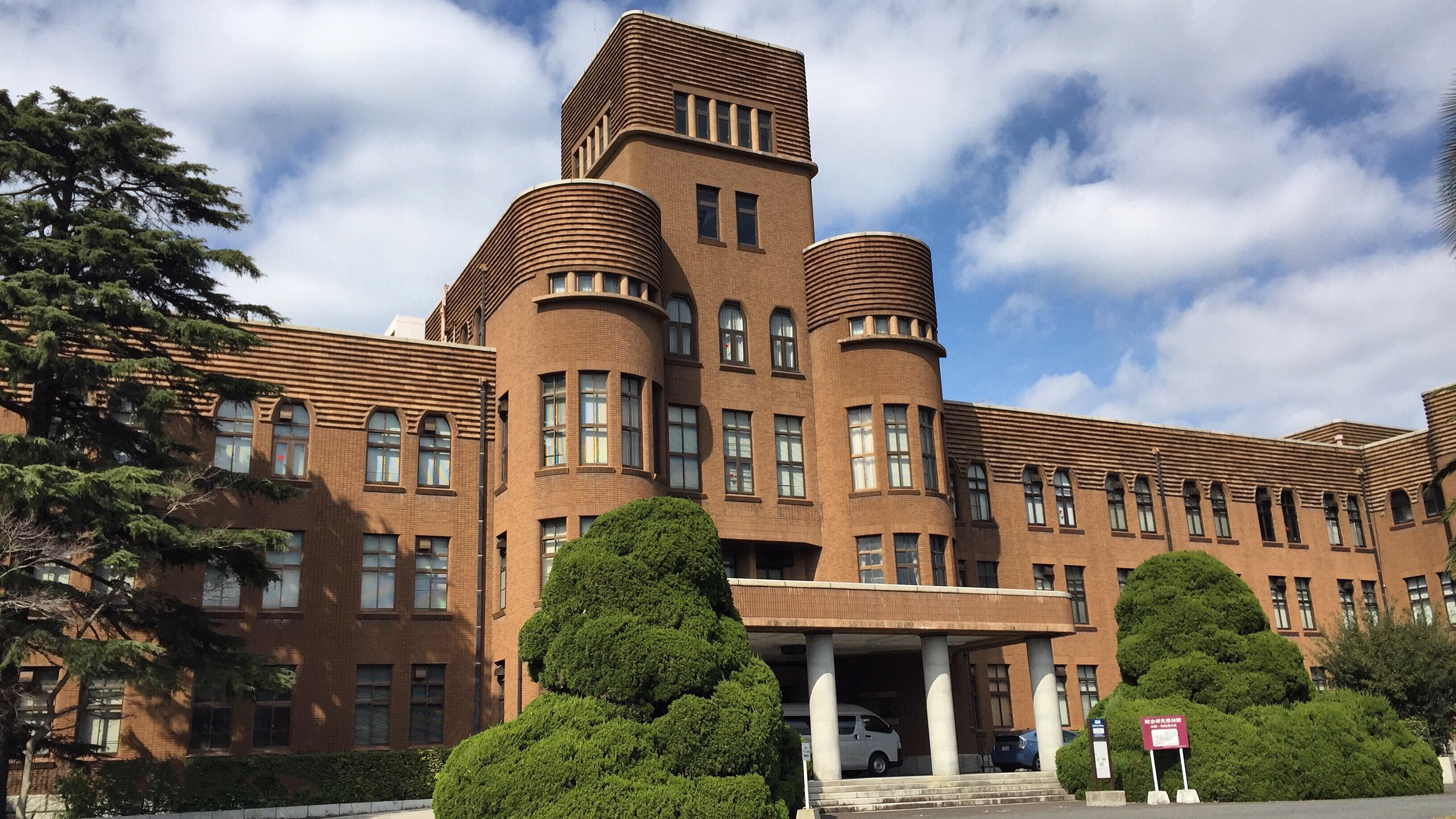
Former School of Engineering Main Building, Hakozaki Campus

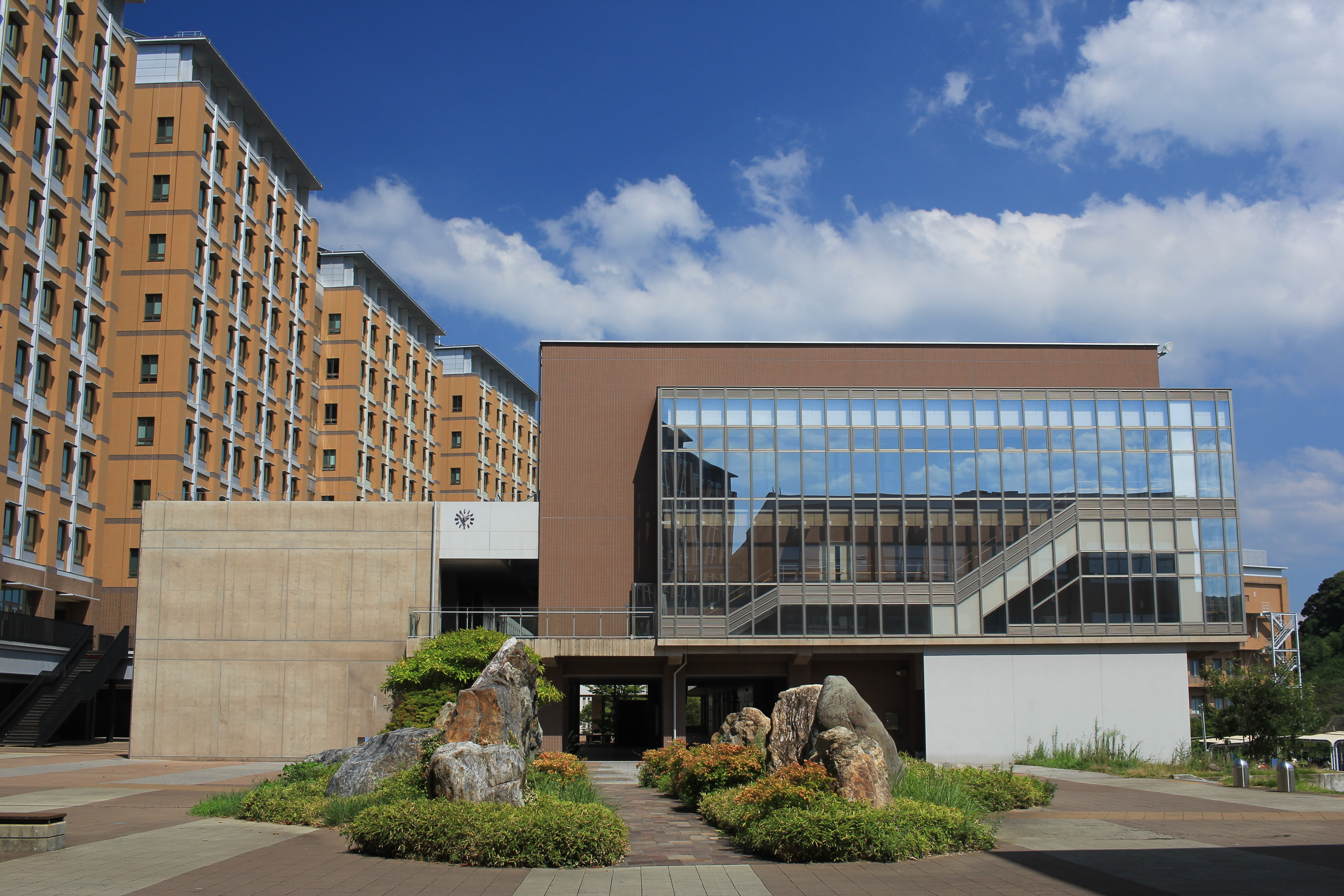
Ito Campus West Zone

Kyushu University (九州大学, Kyūshū Daigaku), abbreviated to Kyudai (九大, Kyūdai), is a public research university located in Fukuoka, Japan, on the island of Kyushu. Founded in 1911 as the fourth Imperial University in Japan, it has been recognised as a leading institution of higher education and research in Kyushu, Japan, and beyond.

The history of the university began a few decades before its founding when the medical school of the Fukuoka Domain (福岡藩) was established in 1867, the final year of the Edo period. The school was reorganised as the Fukuoka Medical College of Kyoto Imperial University in 1903. It became independent as Kyushu Imperial University in 1911.

== History ==
In 1867, the Fukuoka Domain established a medical school called Sanshikan in Tenjin, Fukuoka. Although closed in 1872, its affiliated hospital continued operating. By 1879, it became part of the Fukuoka Prefectural Fukuoka Medical School, later continuing as the Fukuoka Prefectural Fukuoka Hospital.

The push for an imperial university in Kyushu led to the establishment of Fukuoka Medical College in 1903 as a branch of Kyoto Imperial University. Financial challenges delayed further development until the Furukawa Zaibatsu's donation in 1906 facilitated the establishment of Kyushu Imperial University in 1911, with Kenjiro Yamakawa, former president of the University of Tokyo, as its first president. In 1947, it was renamed Kyushu University, and in 1949, it expanded by incorporating several local educational institutions.

In 2003, the university was integrated with the Kyushu Institute of Design. It opened its Ito campus in 2005.

== Organisation ==
Kyushu University's incumbent president is Tatsuro Ishibashi, who was elected in 2020 and is expected to serve until September 2026.

The university has 16 faculties, 11 undergraduate schools, and 18 graduate schools.

- Faculty of Humanities
- Faculty of Social and Cultural Studies
- Faculty of Human-Environment Studies
- Faculty of Law
- Faculty of Economics
- Faculty of Languages and Cultures
- Faculty of Sciences
- Faculty of Mathematics
- Faculty of Medical Sciences
- Faculty of Dental Science
- Faculty of Pharmaceutical Sciences
- Faculty of Engineering
- Faculty of Engineering Sciences
- Faculty of Design
- Faculty of Information Science and Electrical Engineering
- Faculty of Agriculture

== Kyushu University Hospital ==
Kyushu University Hospital has historical roots in the 1867 Sanseikan established by the Kuroda Clan. Initially a clinic for a medical institution, it became affiliated with the Fukuoka Prefectural Medical School in 1879. In 1903, it became associated with the newly formed Fukuoka Medical College, a branch of Kyoto Imperial University. The establishment of Kyushu Imperial University in 1911 brought the hospital under its Faculty of Medicine. Post-World War II reforms in 1947 led to its rebranding as the Kyushu University Faculty of Medical Sciences Affiliated Hospital, incorporating various departments, including dental science. The hospital merged in 2003 with hospitals from the Faculty of Dental Science and Medical Institute of Bioregulation to form the current Kyushu University Hospital.

The hospital's history also includes fatal and torturous medical experiments including live dissection on American POWs by the university's medical faculty in 1945, resulting in war crimes convictions.

== International Education ==
=== Scholarships for international students ===
Kyushu offers a number of selected scholarships for international students. Some of them are:

- Topia Leisure Scholarship (scholarship with work experience)
- JASSO - Encourage privately financed international students learning costs
- Fukuoka International Student Scholarship
- Ushio Foundation Scholarship
- Ajinomoto Scholarship
- Sun Noh Scholarship

== Academic rankings ==
University rankings
Global
THE	General	301–350
QS	General	=170
ARWU	Research	201–300

Regional
THE Asia (Asia version)	General	62
QS Asia (Asia version)	General	34
ARWU Asia	Research	19–26

National

Program rankings
Social Sciences & Humanities

LAW

Natural Sciences & Technology

Engineering

MATERIALS SCIENCE
T.Reuters National	Research	6
T.Reuters World	Research	49

CHEMISTRY
T.Reuters National	Research	6
T.Reuters World	Research	41

BIOLOGY & BIOCHEMISTRY
T.Reuters National	Research	4
T.Reuters World	Research	95

Life Sciences

IMMUNOLOGY
T.Reuters National	Research	4
T.Reuters World	Research	68

PHARMACOLOGY & TOXICOLOGY
T.Reuters National	Research	4
T.Reuters World	Research	76
- * T. Reuters World rankings include non-educational institutions

=== General rankings ===
The university was ranked 5th in the 2020 Times Higher Education Japan University Rankings, which is one rank down from 2019. Japanese prep school Kawaijuku ranked Kyushu as the 7th best university in Japan.

It was ranked 132nd in the 2020 QS World University Rankings, and 401-500th in the Times Higher Education World University Rankings.

According to QS, its subject rankings were 123rd in Engineering & IT, 170th in Life Sciences & Biomedicine, and 150th in Natural Sciences. It was also the 18th-best university in Asia in 2011, according to QS Asian University rankings.

Kyushu University's selectivity for undergraduate degrees is regarded as being among the top 15 in the country.

=== Evaluation from Business World ===
The university ranking according to the order of the evaluation by Personnel Departments of Leading Companies in Japan
	Ranking
Japan	8th (out of 781 universities in Japan as of 2020)
Source	2020 Nikkei Survey to all listed (3,714) and leading unlisted (1,100), totally 4,814 companies

== Notable people associated with Kyushu University ==
=== Chemistry, Physics and Engineering ===
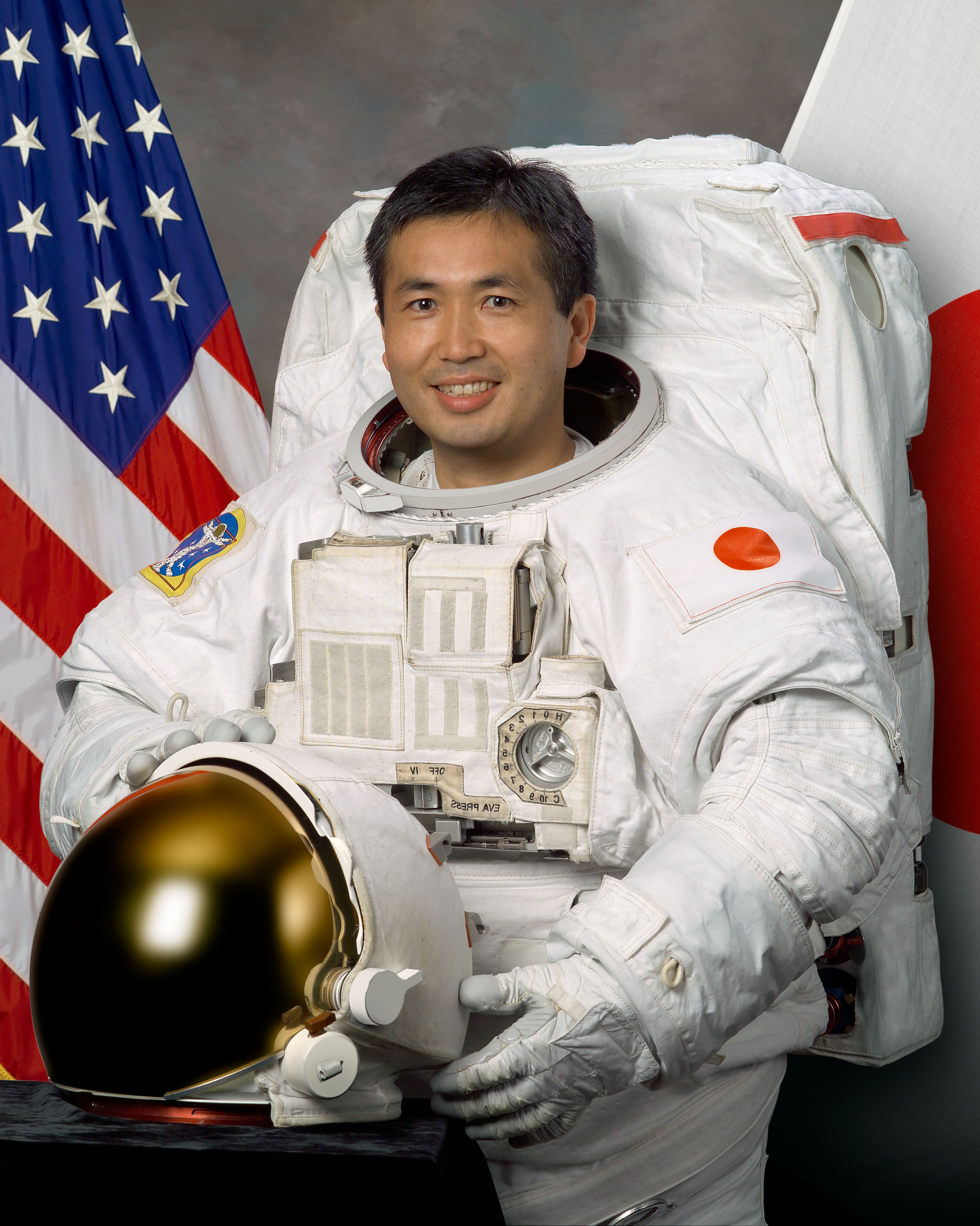
Koichi Wakata PhD, cosmonaut, the first Japanese commander of the International Space Station

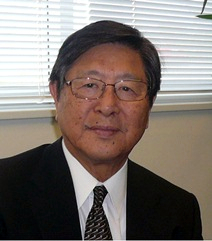
Toyoki Kunitake, chemist and materials scientist, 2015 Kyoto Prize winner

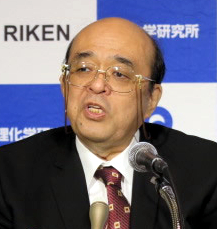
Kōsuke Morita, experimental nuclear physicist, leader of the Japanese team that discovered element 113

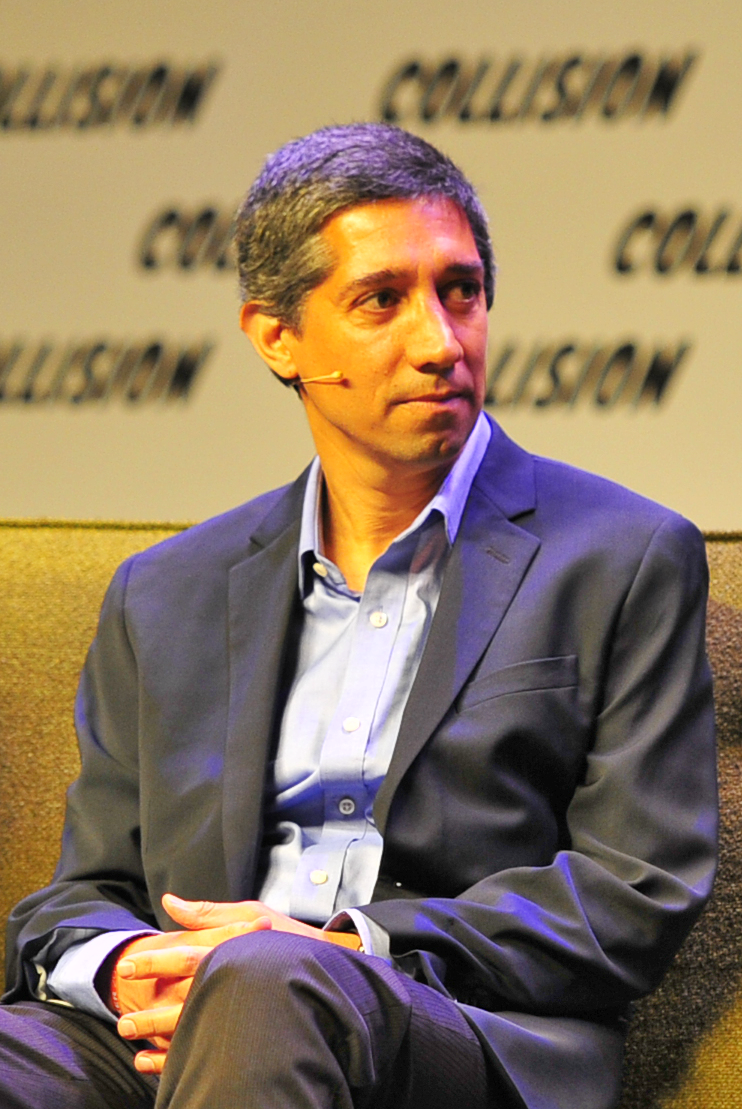
Babak Hodjat PhD, inventor of Siri, CEO of Sentient Technologies
- Kyozi Kawasaki, physicist, 2001 Boltzmann Medal winner
- Genichi Taguchi, engineer and statistician
- Heitaro Nakajima, digital audio pioneer, president Aiwa

=== Physiology or Medicine ===
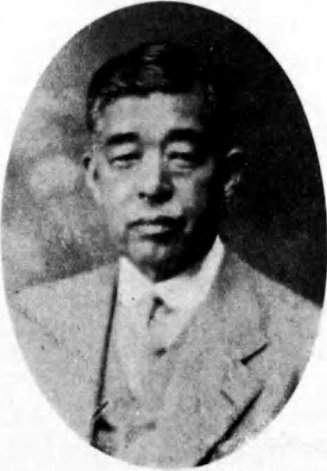
Ryukichi Inada, physician, 1919 Nobel Prize in Physiology or Medicine nominee

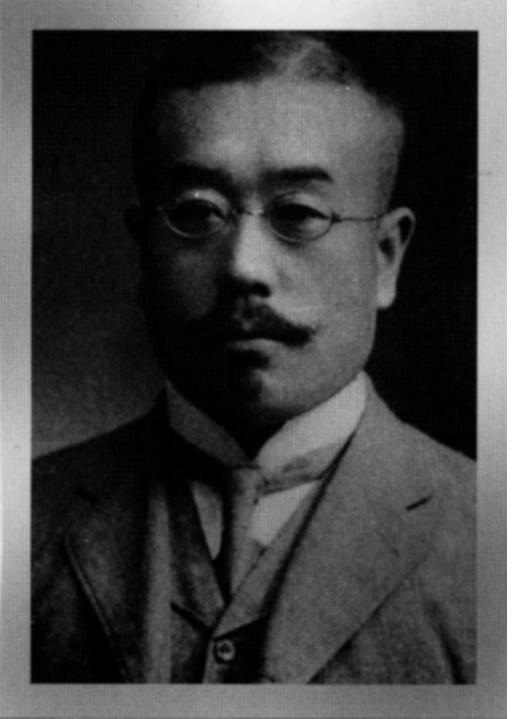
Fujiro Katsurada, parasitologist who discovered a parasite called Schistosoma japonicum

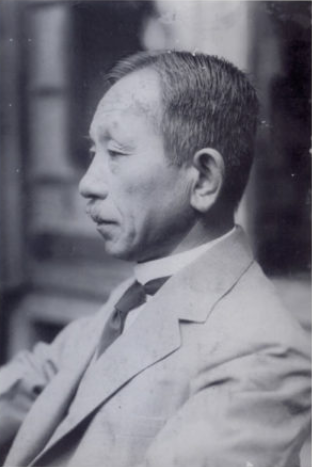
Sunao Tawara, pathologist who discovered the atrioventricular node (Node of Tawara)

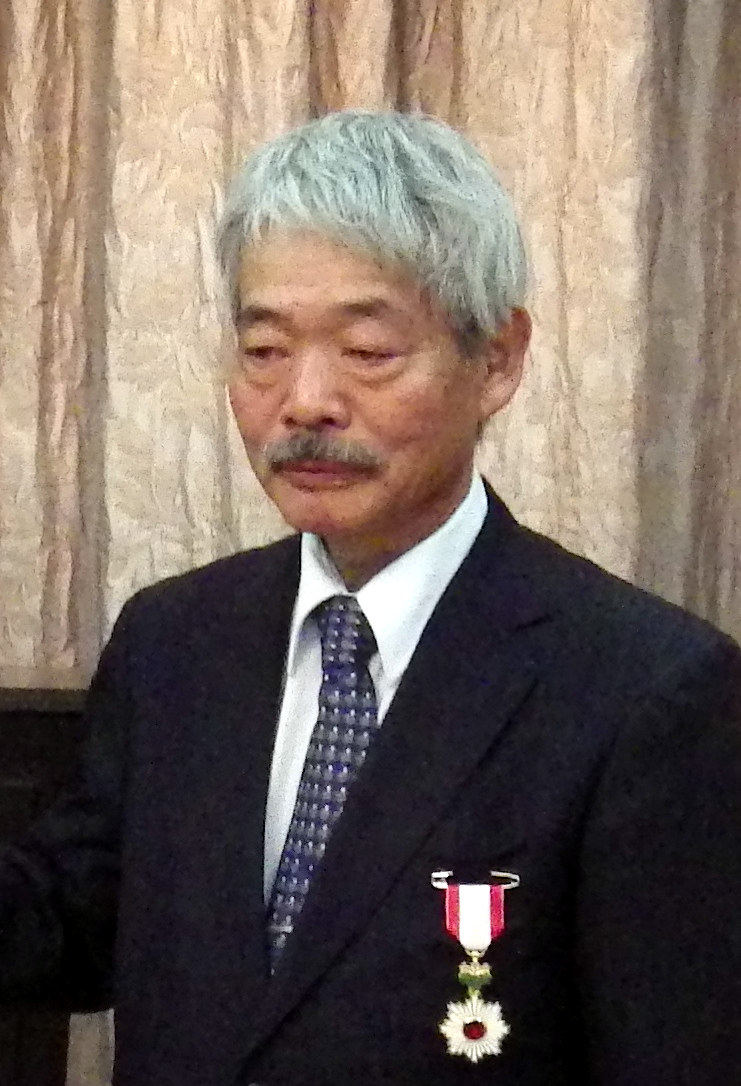
Tetsu Nakamura, physician, headed Peace Japan Medical Services (PMS), 2003 Ramon Magsaysay Award winner
- Inokichi Kubo, pioneer of otorhinolaryngology
- Ōmori Harutoyo, surgeon and first president of the Fukuoka Medical College
- Yukata Ido, surgeon, 1919 Nobel Prize in Physiology or Medicine nominee
- Naosuke Onodera, surgeon, 1937 Nobel Prize in Physiology or Medicine nominee
- Kazuo Yamafuji, scientist, 1964 Nobel Prize in Physiology or Medicine nominee
- Hakaru Hashimoto, MD, PhD, medical scientist, discoverer of Hashimoto's thyroiditis
- Masatoshi Nei, a Japanese-born American evolutionary biologist, 2013 Kyoto Prize winner
- Yoshizumi Ishino, molecular biologist, known for his discovering the DNA sequence of CRISPR
- Takehiko Sasazuki MD, PhD emeritus professor, professor of Kyushu University Institute for Advanced Study (高等研究院)

=== Literature and History ===
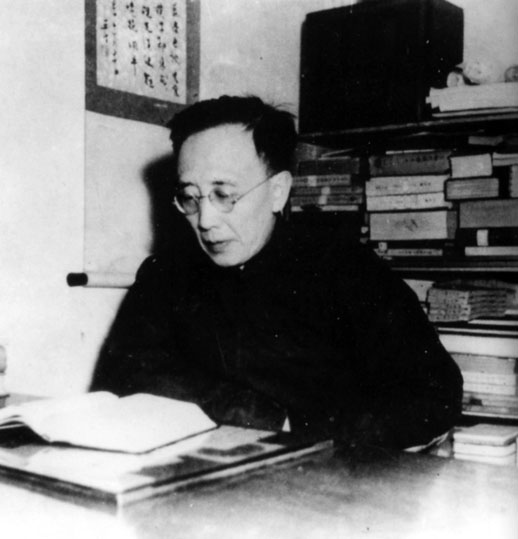
Guo Moruo, Chinese archaeologist, historian, poet, politician, and writer

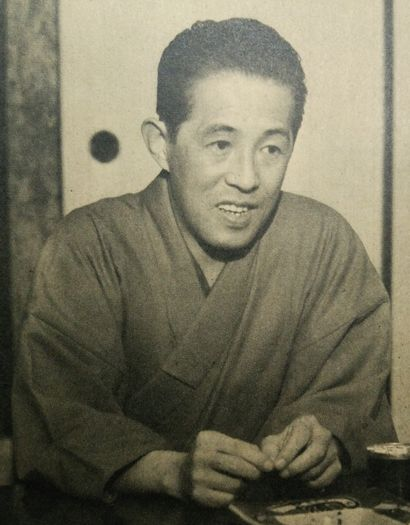
Yasushi Inoue (drop out), Japanese writer, 1950 Akutagawa Prize winner and Nobel Prize in Literature nominee

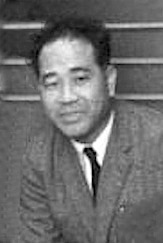
Junzo Shono (庄野 潤三), Japanese novelist, Akutagawa Prize winner
- Junzo Shono, a Japanese novelist, 1954 Akutagawa Prize winner
- Toshio Shimao, a Japanese novelist, 1977 Yomiuri Prize winner
- Kyoichi Katayama, a Japanese author
- Rizō Takeuchi, historian
- Wolfgang Michel-Zaitsu, historian, first foreigner granted a tenure at a Japanese national university
- Hsu Hsing-Ching, president of Chinese Culture University in Taiwan
- Yasuhisa Hara, Japanese cartoonist
- Kyojin Onishi, Japanese novelist and Marxist
- Kyoko Funahashi, Japanese bioarchaeologist

=== Politics and Business ===
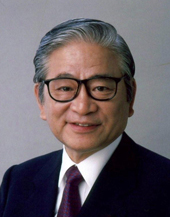
Shozaburo Jimi MD, PhD, Minister of Posts and Telecommunications

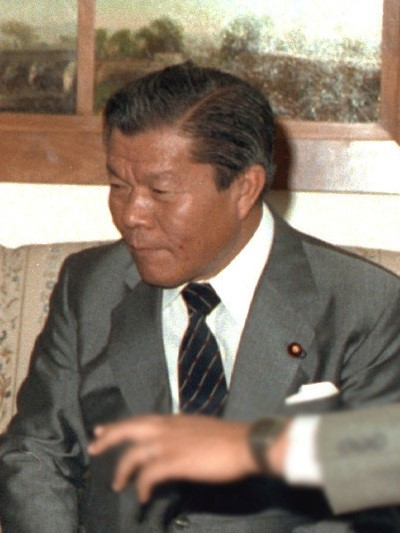
Ichiro Nakagawa, Minister of Agriculture, Forestry and Fisheries, Director-General of the Science and Technology Agency

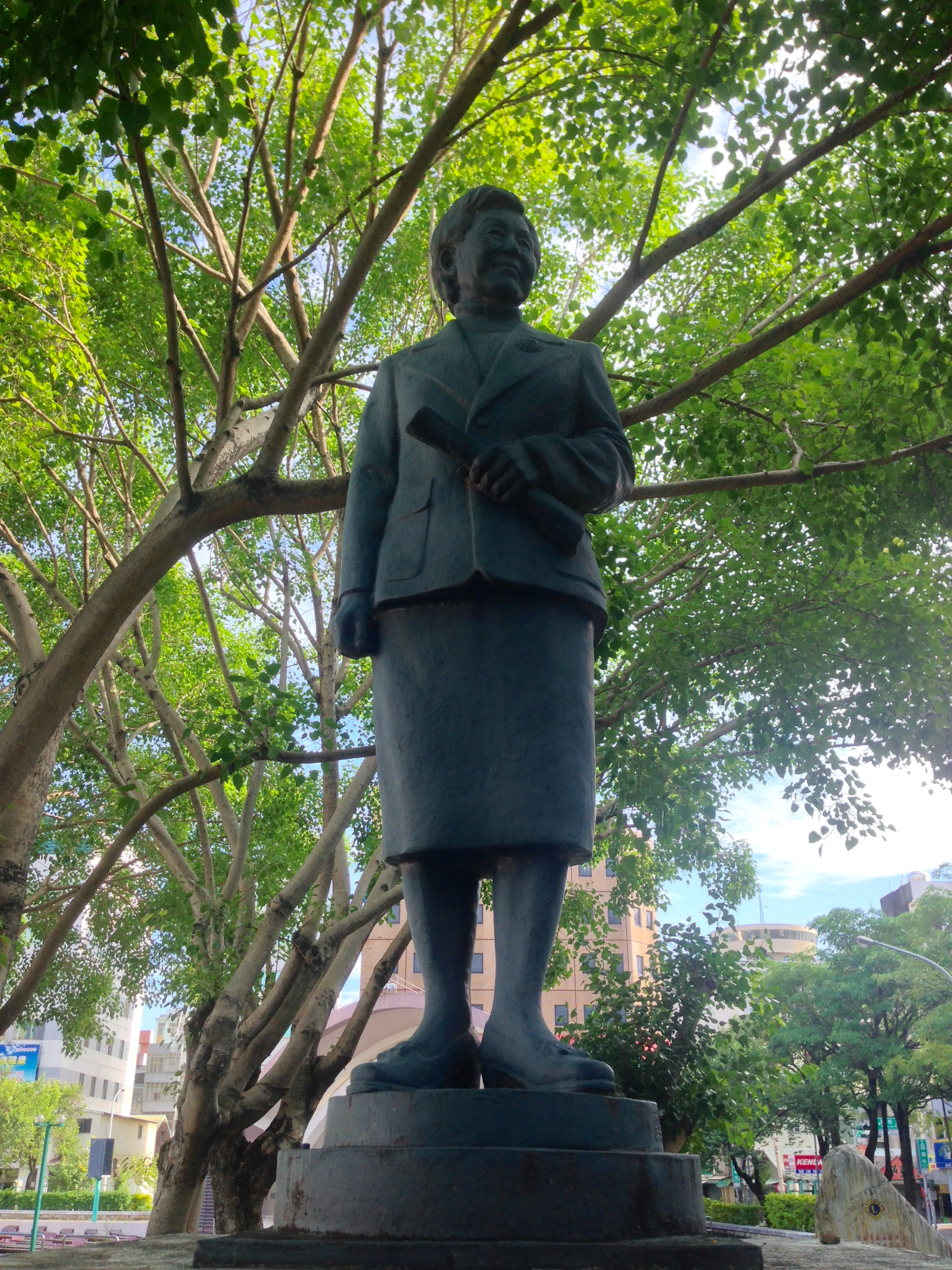
Hsu Shih-hsien, Taiwanese academic and politician, the first Taiwanese woman to earn a doctorate

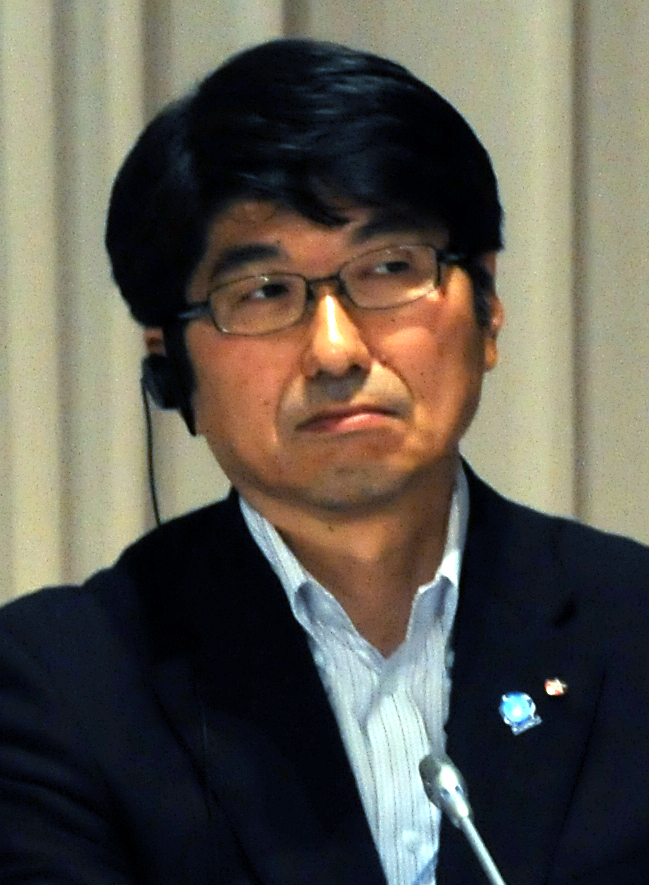
Tomihisa Taue, mayor of Nagasaki
- Shinya Izumi, politician
- Robert T. Huang, founder of Synnex

== See also ==
- National Seven Universities
- Campus of Kyushu University
- Kyushu Institute of Design
- Kyoto University
- Maidashi-Kyūdai-byōin-mae Station
- IBM/Google Cloud Computing University Initiative
- Experimentation on American POWs
