= RedBrick Health =

Coordinates: 44.9732°N 93.2720°W

- RedBrick Health logo Help People Be Healthy
- Founded: 2006
- Founder: Kyle Rolfing, Kurt Cegielski, Pat Sukhum, Kristin Austrum, Abir Sen, David Dickey
- Headquarters: Minneapolis, Minnesota
- Key people: Dan Ryan, CEO
- Number of employees: 400+
- Website: RedBrickHealth.com

RedBrick Health is a health technology and services company based in Minneapolis, Minnesota. RedBrick Health is privately held.

== History ==
RedBrick Health was founded in 2006 by the founders and former management team members of Definity Health. It began offering services in 2007.

In 2007, RedBrick Health partnered with BerylHealth, a former Bedford, Texas–based company, to provide call center support. During this period, RedBrick Health focused on wellness programs and incentive management for large employers, including Welch Allyn, Sara Lee, and Target. Through the partnership, BerylHealth’s Health Advocates managed these services on behalf of the participating companies. Beginning in 2008, the collaboration expanded to include assistance for certain employer groups with resolving medical billing and insurance claims.

RedBrick Health received $45 million in venture capital funding from Highland Capital Partners, Versant Ventures, Fidelity Ventures and Kleiner Perkins Caufield & Byers.

In 2018, RedBrick Health merged with Virgin Pulse.
