= Adam Cheyer =

Co-founder of Siri Inc. (born c. 1966)

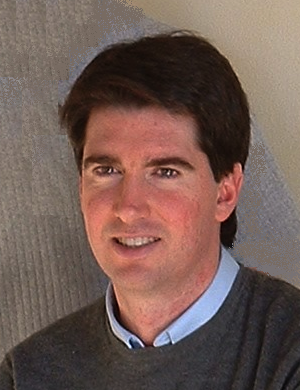
- Cheyer
- Born: 1966-1967
- Education: Sharon High School; Brandeis University; UCLA
- Known for: Siri, CALO
- Scientific career
- Fields: Artificial intelligence
- Workplaces: Apple, Inc. Siri; SRI International; Change.org; Genetic Finance/Sentient Technologies

Adam Cheyer (born c. 1966) is an American computer scientist. He is a co-founder of Siri Inc. and formerly a director of engineering in the iPhone group at Apple.

== Early life and education ==
Cheyer attended Sharon High School, in Sharon, Massachusetts. After graduating in 1984, Cheyer earned a bachelor's degree in computer science from Brandeis University in 1988, and a master's degree in computer science and artificial intelligence from UCLA in 1993.

== Career ==
Prior to Siri, he was a computer scientist and project director in SRI International's Artificial Intelligence Center, where he was the Chief Architect on the CALO project. Cheyer was also a member of the founding team at Change.org and a founder of Sentient Technologies (formerly Genetic Finance).

Adam left the Siri team in 2012 and founded Viv Labs, which was acquired by Samsung in 2016.

After leaving Samsung, Adam Cheyer co-founded GamePlanner.AI with Siamak Hodjat, which was acquired by Airbnb in late 2023 for an estimated $200 million. As of May 2024, Adam is the VP of AI Experience at Airbnb.

In 2024, Cheyer won the 2024 Brandeis University Alumni Achievement Award, which is given annually to "distinguished alumni for outstanding contributions to their chosen field and to society more broadly."

== Personal life ==
Cheyer is a semi-professional magician, and has appeared on numerous television shows, including Season 5 Episode 11 of Penn & Teller: Fool Us in 2018. He is a member of the Academy of Magical Arts (AMA) and the International Brotherhood of Magicians (IBM).

On numerous occasions, Cheyer has made reference to his career in software being aligned with his interest in magic, stating that “entrepreneurs and magicians are exactly the same. They imagine a desirable, impossible future that doesn't exist, and then they work backward from that vision to figure out the math and science to make it come true."

Adam has been married to Lin since 1998 and they have a son Noah. They reside in Oakland Hills, California and San Diego.

== Selected publications ==
- Cheyer, Adam & Martin, David (January 1999). "The Open Agent Architecture: A framework for building distributed software systems". Applied Artificial Intelligence. 13 (1–2).
- Cheyer, Adam (1998). "Multimodal Maps: An Agent-based Approach". In Bunt; Beun; Borghuis (eds.). Multimodal Human-Computer Communication, Lecture Notes in Artificial Intelligence #1374. Springer. pp. 111–121.
- Cheyer, Adam (November 6, 2005). "IRIS: Integrate. Relate. Infer. Share". 1st Workshop on the Semantic Desktop at the International Semantic Web Conference. Galway, Ireland: International Semantic Web Conference.
- Cheyer, Adam (June 2006). "A Collaborative Programming Environment for Web Interoperability". 1st Workshop on Semantic Wikis. Budva, Montenegro.
- Cheyer, Adam (December 15, 2003). "Evolution of the Laws that Deal with the Utilization of Information Networks". 2003 BISC FLINT-CIBI International Joint Workshop on Soft Computing for Internet and BioInformatics. University of California, Berkeley.
