= Trapit =

Content curation service

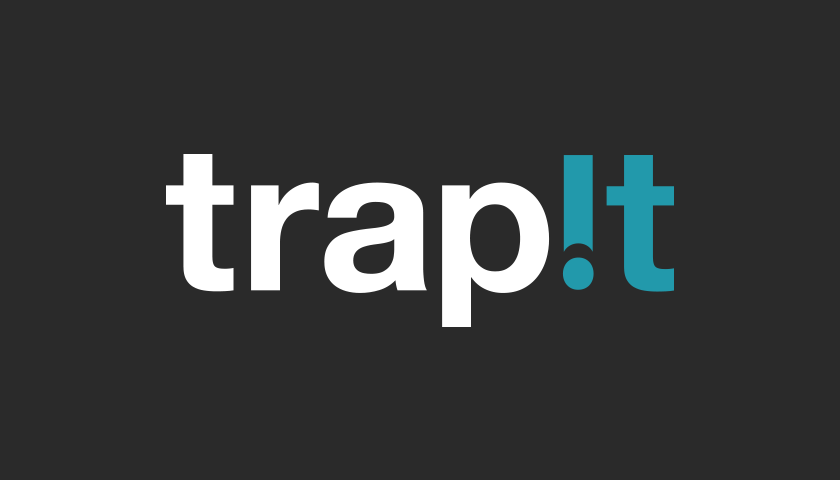
- Industry: Social Selling; Employee Advocacy
- Founded: 2011
- Headquarters: Portland, Oregon and Palo Alto, California
- Key people: Henry Nothhaft, Jr. (CEO); Bill Harris (VP of Sales); Tommy Ziemer (VP of Product)
- Parent: SRI International
- Website: trap.it

Trapit is a comprehensive content curation service for business that offers content discovery, curation, and publishing to web, iPad, and social channels through its web application. The application pulls from text and video sources and offers built-in analytics and social scheduling tools. Trapit is a spin-off of SRI International that uses SRI's CALO technology (the basis for Apple's Siri) to help users discover and publish content. It has acquired about $6.2 million in venture capital funding.

== History ==
Trapit is based on the CALO News Assistant, a prototype system intended to help military personnel filter through news and blog posts. It was initially announced in June 2011, under an initial closed beta until November 2011. In 2011, Trapit raised $5.6 million in venture capital, including from Horizons Ventures, who also invested in Siri. An early feature request involved easy Pinterest integration, as the latter service was sending Trapit a significant amount of traffic.

While the service was initially only usable via a desktop, the company released a free iPad app in July 2012, with a significant redesign released in August 2012. As of August 2012, while iPad users were less than 50% of Trapit's total user base, they were responsible for 84% of the usage of service's usage.

The company moved to acquire paying customers, and the first, announced in September 2012, was the Malaysian media conglomerate Astro. Astro also invested an additional $1.9 million into Trapit. In April 2013, Trapit launched their "Publisher Service" so that app developers can use their own content and create personalized article suggestions using the same underlying technology. In September 2013 Trapit announced its Content Curation Center, which is an all-in-one application designed for publishers and marketers. Brands can use the CCC to find content from Trapit's database of over 100,000 sources, curate and refine that content based on interest, and then easily publish content to a branded web app, iPad app, or social channels. In May 2014, Trapit launched a newly designed user experience for the Trapit product and eliminated the name Content Curation Center, simplifying the product to be called Trapit. The new product includes built-in analytic capabilities and the ability to pull content from video sources.

In December 2014, Trapit and Addvocate, which provides a cloud-based employee advocacy platform, announced their intent to merge.

Trapit was acquired by ScribbleLive in May 2017.
