= Sentient Technologies =

American artificial intelligence technology company

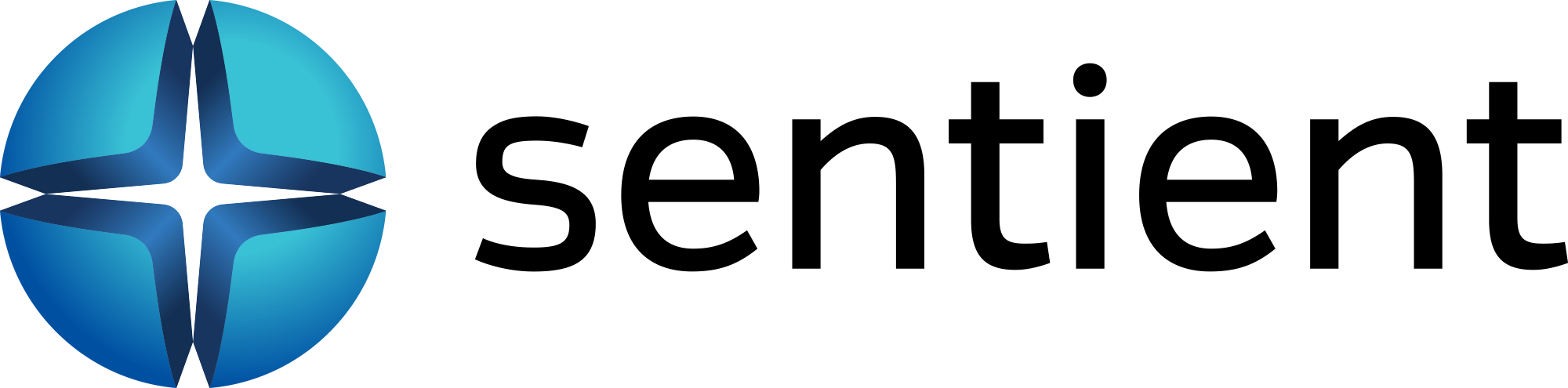
- Formerly: Genetic Finance Holding Ltd.
- Industry: Technology
- Founded: 2007
- Headquarters: San Francisco
- Key people: Antoine Blondeau (Co-Chairman and Co-founder); Babak Hodjat (CEO and Co-founder); Adam Cheyer (Co-founder)
- Products: Sentient Aware; Sentient Ascend
- Website: sentient.ai

Sentient Technologies was an American artificial intelligence technology company based in San Francisco. Sentient was founded in 2007 and received over $143 million in funding at different points after its inception. As of 2016, Sentient was the world's most well-funded AI company. It focused on e-commerce, online content and trading.

The company was dissolved in 2019.

== History ==
Sentient originally operated in stealth mode as Genetic Finance Holding Ltd. The company was founded in 2007 by Antoine Blondeau, Babak Hodjat and Adam Cheyer who created the natural language technology that led to Siri, Apple's voice recognition software. Sentient raised a $2 million Series A round of funding, and $38 million in a Series B round led by Horizons Ventures. Sentient emerged from stealth mode in November 2014 with $103.5 million in Series C funding.

Sentient worked with Massachusetts Institute of Technology's Computer Science and Artificial Intelligence Laboratory to analyze blood pressure to predict the likelihood of sepsis in ICU patients. The technology was researched in association with Saint Michael's Hospital at the University of Toronto. The platform was also used to successfully automate financial services for Sentient's subsidiary, Sentient Investment Management.

In 2015, Sentient launched an AI powered visual intelligence and personalization platform leveraging deep learning and online learning. Shoes.com, a Vancouver-based online shoe retailer, was Sentient's first retail customer for this service. Since its launch, Sentient had other retailer customers.

Sentient Ascend was launched in September 2016 as a SaaS AI based conversion rate optimization platform, largely based on the same AI methods used in its financial technology IP.

In 2019, Sentient Technologies was dissolved, selling off Sentient Ascend to Evolv and much of its AI intellectual property to Cognizant.

== Technology ==
Sentient's platform combined evolutionary computation, which mimics biological evolution, and deep learning, which is based on the structure of nervous systems. Sentient's algorithms worked across as many as two million CPU cores and 5000 GPU cards across 4,000 physical sites around the world, making it one of the largest known systems dedicated to AI.
