= The Divine Comedy (Ai Weiwei album) =

Studio album by Ai Weiwei
- Released: June 22, 2013
- Producer: Zuoxiao Zuzhou

The Divine Comedy is a Chinese rock album released in June 2013. The album is a collaboration between the artist Ai Weiwei and rock musician Zuoxiao Zuzhou. The album contains protest songs against Chinese government's censorship and the treatment Ai Weiwei received under custody.

== Songs ==
1. Just Climb the Wall
2. Chaoyang Park
3. Laoma Tihua
4. Hotel USA
5. Give Tomorrow Back to Me
6. Dumbass

== See also ==
- List of works by Ai Weiwei
