= Karen Myers =

American computer scientist

- Citizenship: Canada
- Education: Stanford University (Ph.D.); University of Toronto (B.Sc.)
- Known for: Artificial Intelligence; Autonomy; Multi-Agent Systems; Automated planning and scheduling Personalization Technologies; Mixed-Initiative Problem Solving
- Scientific career
- Fields: Computer Science
- Workplaces: SRI International Artificial Intelligence Center
- Website: "Karen Myers". SRI International. November 6, 2024.

Karen L. Myers is Vice President, Information and Computing Sciences and Lab Director, Artificial Intelligence Center at SRI International.

== Biography ==
Myers studied at the University of Toronto, graduating with a B.Sc. in mathematics and computer science. She obtained her Ph.D. in computer science from Stanford University. Also, she earned a degree in piano performance from The Royal Conservatory of Music. She joined SRI in 1991.

Myers does research in automated planning and scheduling, autonomy, personalization technologies, mixed-initiative problem solving, and multi-agent systems.

Myers has authored 114 scientific articles. Her work has been published in numerous artificial intelligence journals including International Journal on Artificial Intelligence Tools, Advances in Cognitive Systems, Proceedings of the IEEE International Conference on Advanced Learning Technologies, Proceedings of the International Conference on Artificial Intelligence in Education, AI Magazine, Proceedings of the AAAI Spring Symposium on Intentions in Intelligent Systems, AAAI Press, Proceedings of the First International Conference on Knowledge Capture, Artificial Intelligence for Engineering Design, Analysis and Manufacturing, Computational Intelligence, Journal of Experimental and Theoretical AI, MIT Press, and the Journal of Logic and Computation.

She was elected an AAAI Fellow in 2025.

== Executive Councils and Boards ==
Myers serves on multiple councils and boards. She is on the advisory board for ACM Transactions on Intelligent Systems and Technology, and the editorial boards for the journal Artificial Intelligence, and the Journal for AI Research. Also, she has served on the Executive Council for the International Conference on Automated Planning and Scheduling (ICAPS) and the Association for the Advancement of Artificial Intelligence (AAAI).
