= Kristina Lerman =

American computer scientist

Kristina Lerman (born 1967) is an American network scientist whose research concerns the spread of information on social networks, and fairness in machine learning. She is a research professor at the University of Southern California, in the Computer Science Department of the USC Viterbi School of Engineering, and a principal scientist in the Information Sciences Institute.

== Education and career ==
Lerman majored in physics at Princeton University, graduating in 1989. She completed a Ph.D. in physics at the University of California, Santa Barbara, in 1995, under the joint supervision of Guenter Ahlers and David Cannell.

After working as a systems programmer for Quarterdeck Office Systems from 1996 to 1998, she joined USC's Information Sciences Institute (ISI) as a researcher in 1998. She added an affiliation as research faculty with USC's Computer Science Department in 2004. She has been principal scientist at ISI since 2018, and research professor at USC since 2020.

== Recognition ==
Lerman was named a Fellow of the Association for the Advancement of Artificial Intelligence in 2022.
