= Apan (disambiguation) =

Apan is a municipality of the state of Hidalgo, Mexico.

Apan or APAN may also refer to:

- 159215 Apan, an asteroid
- APAN Star Awards, an awards ceremony for excellence in television in South Korea
- The Ape (2009 film), Swedish film (original title Apan)
- Asia Pacific Adaptation Network, climate research organisation based in Thailand
- Asia Pacific Advanced Network, association of Asia-Pacific NRENs
- All Partners Access Network (formerly Asia Pacific Area Network), former United States government website used for unclassified information sharing for humanitarian aid, disaster management, and security collaboration
- Australia Palestine Advocacy Network, an Australian Palestinian advocacy organisation
