= Paul Kim (academic) =

Korean-American academic

- Hong Suk Kim
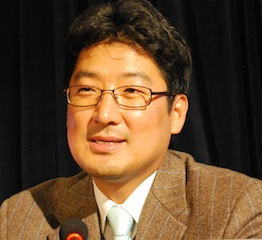
- Born: 1970 (age 55–56); Inchon, South Korea
- Education: University of Southern California
- Scientific career
- Fields: Entrepreneurship, Empowerment; Education Technology; Design Technology
- Workplaces: Stanford University

Paul Kim (born 1970) is a Korean-American academic. He is the Chief Technology Officer and Associate Dean at the Stanford Graduate School of Education and has held this position since 2001.

While at Stanford, in addition to teaching graduate level courses in the School of Education, he has been leading projects involving the design of learning technologies, educational research, and community development.

== Career ==
Kim received his Ph.D. in educational technology at the University of Southern California in 1999. Since completing his doctorate, he has held posts such as the advisor for the National Science Foundation Education and Human Resources Directorate, the advisor of Grand Challenges in International Development for the National Academies of Science, executive director of information technology at the University of Phoenix, the vice president and chief information officer at Vatterott College, and the chairman of the board for the Intercultural Institute of California.

He has been chief technology officer and associate dean at the Stanford Graduate School of Education since 2001, the Founder and Advisor of Seeds of Empowerment which is a Nonprofit Global Education Institute Funded by UNESCO since 2006, the advisor of Asian Development Bank since 2019.

In all of these positions, Kim has focused on improving access and equity in education throughout both developed and developing countries.

== Projects and research ==
Kim leads initiatives involving the design of learning technologies, educational research, and community development. Kim is also working with numerous international organizations to develop mobile empowerment solutions for extremely underserved communities in developing countries. In his recent expeditions to Latin America, Africa, and India, he investigated the effects of highly programmable open-source mobile learning platforms on education programs for literacy, numeracy, and entrepreneurship (e.g., math games, storytelling, and farming simulations). As part of his research, he is also exploring mobile wireless sensors in simulation-based learning and ePortfolio-based assessment to promote creativity, critical thinking, and problem solving.

Kim launched a Massive open online course (MOOC) titled "Designing A New Learning Environment" in 2012. The course was geared towards empowering education enthusiasts of all backgrounds to cultivate the understanding necessary to create a cutting-edge 21st century learning environment that is both innovative and sustainable. The course invited 20,000 students from 170 different countries, and over 6200 students received a certificate of completion. The average completion rate for MOOC is 5-15%, compared with 30% for this course.

Kim founded a voluntary 501(C3) non-profit organization named XRI in 2006 and an accompanying initiative named Seeds of Empowerment. Seeds of Empowerment is a spin-off of Stanford Graduate School of Education, which aims to provide an opportunity to empower children and meet their needs by utilizing innovative mobile technology and educational research from Stanford University. The Seeds of Empowerment now includes three projects:

1. Stanford Mobile Inquiry-based Learning Environment (SMILE): The SMILE server software is designed to create a highly interactive learning environment that promotes higher-order learning opportunities (e.g., creation of inquiries, presentation of questions, analysis of peer-generated questions, evaluation of individual students and overall class performance, etc.), engage students in inquiry-based learning sessions at a global scale and generates real-time learning analytics. In addition to SMILE, the SMILE-PI includes software such as Wikipedia for Schools, Khan Academy videos and exercises, software for teaching coding skills and more. The SMILE project was mentioned as an innovative solution for the future of education in the 2016 UN report titled “Investing in education for a changing world”.
2. 1001 stories: A mobile storytelling program facilitates the creation, development, and gathering of stories from local communities around the world. The 1001 Stories Program conducts storytelling workshops that build on children's natural potential to become original storytellers.
3. Halo curriculum: A learning model aligns with the extended version of Engineering Design Process — Discover, Define, Explore, Ideate, Create, Test, and Evaluate. HALO curriculum uses UN Sustainable Development Goals (SDG) to develop and supplement curriculum topics.

His recent representative projects and researches include as follows: the University X, a design of future university based on an entrepreneurship global incubator network sponsored by The Executive Council of Dubai. The University of Oman, design advice for the establishment of a new national science and technology university Sponsored by Sultanate of Oman; Design and development of programmable open mobile internet for education 2020, sponsored by National Science Foundation; National online education strategy development advice, Sponsored by Ministry of Education (Saudi Arabia); Evaluation of mobile learning initiative for public schools Sponsored by Telecom Argentina; Evaluation of Plan CEIBAL (Uruguayan version of One Laptop Per Child Project) Sponsored by Universidad ORT Uruguay.

== Professional activity ==
Kim has been actively encouraging the students in his graduate classes at Stanford to take classroom projects to the real world, and some of the work that has come out of Seeds of Empowerment work has succeeded to the final rounds of global competitions sponsored by organizations including the Sesame Workshop, WISE by the Qatar Foundation, and the Marvell 100K Challenge.

In higher education, he advises investment bankers and technology ventures focused on e-learning, knowledge management, and mobile communication solutions. His due-diligence engagements include early-stage angel funding and also later-stage private equity-based investments for large enterprises such as Grand Canyon University, Northcentral University, NCA/HLC accredited online universities, and Penn Foster College. His recent international advisement cases include the Saudi Arabia national online university initiative, a global online education program sponsored by Deutsche Telekom, institutional development for Universidad Tecnológica de El Salvador, and WASC accreditation for the CETYS Universidad in Mexico.

In his keynote presentations and publications, he often presents a value-centered ecosystem borrowing Charles Darwin’s theory of evolution. In his view, individuals and organizations must evolve in order to stay competitive and that any advantage in the ecosystem is always temporary. His unconventional education models have been referred as future education systems.

== Selected publications ==
- Kim, Paul; Lee, Jieun (2019). "Evolution of Online Learning Environments and the Emergence of Intelligent MOOCs". MOOCs and Open Education in the Global South. pp. 329–341. doi:10.4324/9780429398919-34. ISBN 9780429398919. S2CID 209071563.
- Kim, Paul; An, Ji-Young (2016). "New Evaluation Vector through the Stanford Mobile Inquiry-Based Learning Environment (SMILE) for Participatory Action Research". Healthcare Informatics Research. 22 (3): 164–71. doi:10.4258/hir.2016.22.3.164. PMC 4981576. PMID 27525157.
- Russell, Susan Garnett; Lim, Sanaya; Kim, Paul; Morse, Sophie (2016). "The legacy of gender-based violence and HIV/AIDS in the postgenocide era: Stories from women in Rwanda". Health Care for Women International. 37 (7): 721–743. doi:10.1080/07399332.2015.1083026. PMID 26291248. S2CID 3692359.
- Kim, Paul; Suh, Esther; Song, Donggil (2015). "Development of a design-based learning curriculum through design-based research for a technology-enabled science classroom". Educational Technology Research and Development. 63 (4): 575–602. doi:10.1007/s11423-015-9376-7. S2CID 62650542.
- Kim, Paul, ed. (2014). Massive Open Online Courses. doi:10.4324/9781315848655. ISBN 9781315848655.
- Buckner, Elizabeth; Kim, Paul (2014). "Integrating technology and pedagogy for inquiry-based learning: The Stanford Mobile Inquiry-based Learning Environment (SMILE)". Prospects. 44: 99–118. doi:10.1007/s11125-013-9269-7. S2CID 143652918.
- Kim, Paul; Kim, Flora Hisook; Karimi, Arafeh (2012). "Public Online Charter School Students". American Educational Research Journal. 49 (3): 521–545. doi:10.3102/0002831212443078. S2CID 145777584.
- Buckner, Elizabeth; Kim, Paul (2012). "Mobile innovations, executive functions, and educational developments in conflict zones: A case study from Palestine". Educational Technology Research and Development. 60: 175–192. doi:10.1007/s11423-011-9221-6. S2CID 144364350.
- Kim, Paul; Buckner, Elizabeth; Kim, Hyunkyung; Makany, Tamas; Taleja, Neha; Parikh, Vallabhi (2012). "A comparative analysis of a game-based mobile learning model in low-socioeconomic communities of India". International Journal of Educational Development. 32 (2): 329–340. doi:10.1016/j.ijedudev.2011.05.008.
- Kim, Paul; Lee, Donghwan; Lee, Youngjo; Huang, Chuan; Makany, Tamas (2011). "Collective intelligence ratio". Team Performance Management. 17: 41–62. doi:10.1108/13527591111114701. S2CID 143406700.
- Kim, Paul; Hagashi, Teresita; Carillo, Laura; Gonzales, Irina; Makany, Tamas; Lee, Bommi; Gàrate, Alberto (2011). "Socioeconomic strata, mobile technology, and education: A comparative analysis". Educational Technology Research and Development. 59 (4): 465–486. doi:10.1007/s11423-010-9172-3. S2CID 54088607.
- Kim, Paul H. (2009). "Action research approach on mobile learning design for the underserved". Educational Technology Research and Development. 57 (3): 415–435. doi:10.1007/s11423-008-9109-2. S2CID 47854404.
- Park, Choong Bum; Hoon Choi; Kim, Paul (2009). "Adaptive open mobile learning device for the underserved". 2009 Digest of Technical Papers International Conference on Consumer Electronics. pp. 1–2. doi:10.1109/ICCE.2009.5012267. ISBN 978-1-4244-2558-7. S2CID 34864722.
- Kim, Paul; Ng, Chen Kee; Lim, Gloria (2010). "When cloud computing meets with Semantic Web: A new design for e-portfolio systems in the social media era". British Journal of Educational Technology. 41 (6): 1018–1028. doi:10.1111/j.1467-8535.2010.01055.x.
- Kim, Paul; Hong, Ji-Seong; Bonk, Curtis; Lim, Gloria (2011). "Effects of group reflection variations in project-based learning integrated in a Web 2.0 learning space". Interactive Learning Environments. 19 (4): 333–349. doi:10.1080/10494820903210782. S2CID 41529245.
- Kim, Paul; Miranda, Talia; Olaciregui, Claudia (2008). "Pocket School: Exploring mobile technology as a sustainable literacy education option for underserved indigenous children in Latin America". International Journal of Educational Development. 28 (4): 435–445. doi:10.1016/j.ijedudev.2007.11.002.
- Kim, Paul (2006). "Effects of 3D virtual reality of plate tectonics on fifth grade students' achievement and attitude toward science". Interactive Learning Environments. 14: 25–34. doi:10.1080/10494820600697687. S2CID 12036415.

== Selected keynotes ==
- “Pedagogical Divides, Digital Learning, & 21st Century Workforce,” Global Education & Skill Forum, Dubai, U.A.E. March, 2019 (Invited Speech).
- “Learning and Assessment in the Age of AI,” Artificial Intelligence and Adaptive Education Conference, Beijing, China, 2019. (Invited Speech).
- “Teacher Preparation for 21st Classrooms,” Global Symposium on ICT in Education 2018, Seoul, Korea, September, 2019. (Keynote).
- “Personalization in Education,” TMRW Institute Conference, London, U.K. December, 2018. (Invited Talk).
- “Future Talent Development and Science-driven Industry,” Korea Science Foundation Annual Conference Keynote, Seoul, Korea, November 26, 2018. (Keynote).
- “AI to transform Education, Training, Assessment, and Digital Assistant Ecosystems,” Education 4.0 Conference. National Taiwan Normal University, Taipei, Taiwan, November, 2018. (Keynote).
- “Education for 4th Industrial Revolution,” E-Learning Korea, September, 2018. (Keynote).
- “AI-based Learning inquiry System,” ASU GSV. April, 2018. (Invited Talk).
- “Education and the 4th Industrial Revolution,” 7th International Skill Forum by Asian Development Bank, Manila, Philippines. December 12, 2017. (Keynote).
- “Characters of Global Leaders in the 21st Century,” Global HR Forum, Seoul, Korea, November 1, 2017. (Invited Talk).
- “Discourse on Education Technologies for the 4th Industrial Revolution, E-Learn, Symposium, Vancouver, Canada, October, 2017. (Keynote).
- “Teacher Training for 21st Century Teaching,” Institute for Teaching Science and Technology, Bangkok, Thailand, June, 2017. (Keynote).
- “New Collar Workforces and the 4 th industrial Revolution,” Asia Pacific Education Minister Forum, Seoul, Korea, April, 2017. (Keynote).
- “Digital Revolution in Education,” Middle East Digital Education Conference, Dubai, UAE, December, 2016. (Keynote).
- “Changing Education Landscape and New Workforce,” Ministerial Forum, Mexico City, Mexico, November, 2016. (Keynote).
- “Education for Future Talents and 4th Industrial Revolution,” CMS Brunch Seminar, Seoul, Korea, July,2016. (Keynote).
- “Academic Excellence in the Post MOOC Era” at the Institutionalizing Best Practice in Higher Education Conference, University of the West Indies, Trinidad & Tobago, 2015. (Keynote).
- “MOOC Innovations and New Definitions of Teaching and Learning in the 21st Century” at MOOCs and Beyond Conference, Nanjing, China, 2015. (Keynote).
- “Lessons Learned from Global Mobile Learning Initiative” at M Learning Conference, Bowling Green State University, Ohio, 2014. (Keynote).
- “MOOCs through the Lens of Sustainability” at E-Learn Symposium, Las Vegas, NV, 2013. (Keynote).
- “Causing a Paradigm Shift in the Global Education Ecosystem” at University of San Diego, CA, 2013 (Invited Talk).
- “MOOCs and beyond” symposium at Stifterverband fur die Deutsche Wissenschaft, Berlin, Germany, 2013 (Keynote).
- “Ecosystematic Innovation for Indigenous People in Latin America. Is Connectivity a Human Right of the 21st Century?” at Stanford University Center on Democracy, Development, and the Rule of Law, May, 2012. (Invited Talk).
- “Stanford Mobile Inquiry-Based Learning Environment” at Teaching, Colleges & Community 2012 Conference, Honolulu, Hawaii, April, 2012. (Keynote).
- “Mobile Learning, Gaming, and Digital Books” at Society for Information Technology and Teacher Education, Austin Texas, March, 2012. (Invited Talk).
- “Inquiry-based Learning) UNESCO & CoSN International Symposium, Washington, D.C., March, 2012. (Invited Talk).
- "Future Education Ecosystem" - UNESCO, Paris, December 16, 2011.
- "Mobile Innovations to improve rural community schools" - National Symposium by Argentina Telecom, Buenos Aires, Argentina, August, 2011.
- "Pedagogical paradigm shift" - ORT University, Montevideo, Uruguay, August, 2011.
- "Causing Evolution in the Education Ecosystem" - EDEN(European Distance Education Network) Annual Conference, Dublin, Ireland, June,2011.
- "Contextualized Innovations in Education" - Imagination Summit, La Mirada, CA, April, 2011.
- "Global Alliance For the 21st Century Education Ecosystem", Omani Society for Education Technology, First International Conference on Blended and Mobile Learning, Muscat, Oman, December, 2010.
- "How innovative technology can make a difference for the underserved"National Center for Technology Innovation, Washington, D.C., November, 2010.
- "Evolution in the 21st Century Higher Education Ecosystem," E-LEARN, Orlando, Florida, October, 2010.
- "Evolution of higher education in the 21st century," National Learning and Teaching Forum, Melbourne, Australia, September, 2010.
- "Evaluating higher education institutions in the 21st century," QS Higher Education Forum, Lima, Peru, September, 2010.
- "ICT National Initiatives and Mobile Innovations 2020," Ministry of ICT, Rwanda, Kigali, Rwanda, August, 2010.
- "Programmable Open Mobile Internet Ecosystem," ETRI (Electronics and Telecommunications Research Institute), Deajon, Korea, June, 2010.
- "Disintegration: The Strategy for Causing Technology Evolution," KISTI (Korea Institute of Science and Technology Information), *Deajon, Korea, June, 2010.
- "Mobile Technology Ecosystem for Education and Workforce Development," VIRTUAL EDUCA, Santo Domingo, Dominican Republic, June, 2010.
- "Mobile Innovation and Global Education Ecosystem," Global Learn, Penang, Malaysia, May, 2010.
- "Contextualization of Mobile Technology for Education, Empowerment, & Peace," Berzeit University, West Bank, Palestine, March, 2010.
- "Mobile Education: Perspectives on the Role of Teacher, School, and Parent," Universidad Tecnológica, San Salvador, March, 2010.
- "Programmable Open Mobile Internet (POM1) 2020,"APAN Annual Meeting, Sydney, January, 2010.
- "Mobile Technology & Entrepreneurship," INCAE (Instituto Centroamericano de Administración de Empresas ) Business School, San Jose, Costa Rica, December, 2009.
- "Innovation - Increasing Access Through Technology," World Innovation Summit for Education, Qatar Foundation, Doha, Qatar, November, 2009.
- "Entrepreneurship in Education,"Indian Institute of Management, Ahmedabad, India, August, 2009.
- "Charter Schools & Technology Innovation," National Charter Schools Conference, Washington, D.C., June, 2009.
- "Mobile Creative Economy and International Development," National Information Society Agency, Ministry of Public Administration and Security, Seoul, Korea, May, 2009.
- "Mobile Innovation in Medical Education," Korea Software Promotion Agency, Ministry of Knowledge Economy, Seoul, Korea, May, 2009.
- "Mobile Innovation and Entrepreneurship," Venture Capital in Education Summit, Stanford, CA, May, 2009.
- "Mobile Learning Design and Contextualized Innovation," American Educational Research Association, San Diego, CA, April, 2009
- "Digital Innovation and Empowerment for All," International Conference on E-Learning and Distance Learning, Riyadh, Kingdom of Saudi Arabia, March, 2009.
- "Health Education through Mobile Innovation in Developing Countries," National Information Society Agency, Ministry of Public Administration and Security, Korea, February, 2009.
- "Boosting Educational Development and Creative Economy through Mobile Innovation" National University of Rwanda, Huye, Rwanda, January, 2009.
- "E-Learning and M-Learning Case Studies" Future Education Forum hosted by KERIS (Korea Education & Research Information Service), Ministry of Education and Science, Korea, December, 2008.
- "The world of Web 2.0 in Distance Education." 24th Annual Conference on Distance Teaching & Learning, Madison, WI, August, 2008.
- "Mobile Innovation in Health Education," Asia Pacific Ministry of Health Summit - Health ministers from the Pacific Region, Seoul, Korea, July, 2008.
- "E-portfolios, Accreditation, Institutional Accountability," Korea Engineering Education Association Annual Forum, Seoul, Korea, July, 2008.
- "Mobile Empowerment in the developing world," Nokia Research Center, Palo Alto, CA, April, 2008.
- "Clinical Diagnosis and Medical Education through Internet 2 and GLORIAD 10 Gbps backbone ," CENIC (Corporation for Education Network Initiatives in California), Oakland, CA, March, 2008.
- "Active engagement strategies in a web-integrated science learning environment," SITE( Society for Information Technology & Education) Annual Meeting, Las Vegas, March, 2008.
- "E-PBL: Multimodal Synchronous Learning Environment in Medical Education," APAN (Asia Pacific Advanced Network) Annual Meeting, Hawaii, January, 2008.
