= Subtext (disambiguation) =

Subtext is that content of a text or performance which is not announced explicitly but is implicit.

Subtext may also refer to:

- Subtext (programming language), a moderately visual programming language and environment, for writing application software
- Subtext Weblog Software, blog-publishing software
