= NCTI =

NCTI may refer to:

- National Center for Technology Innovation, a U.S. center for advanced learning for students, focusing on those with disabilities
- National Centre for Trade Information (est. 1995), a subsidiary centre for the government of India agency India Trade Promotion Organisation
- North Central Technical Institute (name in use: 1967-1988; est. 1912), former name of Wausau, Wisconsin, USA, community college Northcentral Technical College
