= Amal Academy =

Academy Founded in 2013

- عمل اکیڈمی
- Formation: 2013
- Founder: Benje Williams
- Founded at: Lahore, Punjab, Pakistan
- Type: Private (non-profit)
- Purpose: Education, Job-skills and career training
- Headquarters: Lahore, Punjab, Pakistan
- Location: Khizer Road, Upper Mall, Lahore
- Coordinates: 31.53888°N 74.357222°E
- Region served: Pakistan
- Services: Career Development Skills
- Official language: Urdu; English
- CEO: Ali Siddiq
- Co-founder: Kunal Chawla
- Main organ: Amal Career-Prep Fellowship
- Affiliations: Acumen Fund, Stanford Graduate School of Business, Echoing Green, Dr. Paul Kim
- Staff: 100+
- Students: 1000+
- Website: amalacademy.org

Amal Academy (Urdu: عمل اکیڈمی) was founded in 2013 by Stanford University graduates Benje Williams and Kunal Chawla and is funded by Acumen Fund, Stanford Graduate School of Business, Echoing Green and Syed Babar Ali.

== Etymology and overview ==
"Amal" is an Urdu word for "action" and is derived from Pakistan's national poet Allama Iqbal phrase, "The world is not something to be merely seen or known through concepts, but something to be made and re-made by continuous action/amal." Academy's initial name was "Setu Institute", derived from Sanskrit word for "Bridge; सेतु" as Benje and co-founder Kunal initially considered launching the organization in India.

== History ==
Amal Academy was founded by Stanford University graduates Benje Williams and Kunal Chawla. Williams who graduated from Stanford's Business School worked with Acumen Fund as a Global Fellow and was responsible for hiring and training marketing officers at a social enterprise in Lahore where he initiated the idea after seeing a gap between "workforce preparation and business needs". He later enrolled in the MBA at Stanford's Business graduate school, where he met Indian-born American Kunal Chawla, an MA student at the university's Graduate School of Education. Chawla previously worked with Google as a consultant for its leading development online education platform to middle school students across north India and worked at an Acumen-funded education social enterprise. Williams said, “We realized how closely aligned our passions and values were and decided to work on a project together.”

== Funding and investors ==
Amal Academy is funded by Acumen Fund, Stanford University's Graduate School of Business and chief technology officer Dr. Paul Kim. of Stanford Graduate School of Education. Pakistan-based companies such as NIB Bank, Engro Corporation, State Bank of Pakistan serves as the corporate partners of Academy. In 2014, a years after its foundation, Academy was awarded $125,000 (13,078,125 PKR) by Stanford Social Innovation Program.

Amal Fellowship is primarily funded by Stanford graduates, Acumen fellows, Fulbrighters, LUMS graduates and Amal alumni. In addition Academy has advisors and mentors, such as Jacqueline Novogratz (CEO of Acumen), Chris Anderson (CEO of TED), Syed Babar Ali (Founder of LUMS), Jawad Aslam (CEO of Ansaar Management Company), Dr. Kamran Shams (CEO of Punjab Education Endowment Fund), Yasser Bashir (CEO of Arbisoft), Dr. Paul Kim, and others.

== Programs ==
=== Amal Career-Prep Fellowship ===
The Amal Career-Prep Fellowship is a flagship three-months career-prep program that help build job-ready skills in individuals such as communication, professionalism, teamwork, career planning, leadership, etc. The purpose of the Fellowship is to prepare university graduates for the workplace by enabling them to develop their professional and business skills. In 2013, Academy initiated its first fellowship at University of Engineering and Technology and since then has been conducting various simultaneous fellowships at various institutions in Lahore and in 2016 Amal held its first fellowship at University of Agriculture in Faisalabad. With support from PepsiCo, they have also expanded the Fellowship to Karachi (2019) and Peshawar (2020).

Apart from Fellowship, the Academy has also provided corporate trainings to different companies including Nestle, Arbisoft, INTECH, Bank Alfalah, Allied Bank, etc. including a training with Higher Education Commission on "Narrowing the Industry-Academia Gap".
