= Zimbra =

Collaborative software suite

Zimbra Collaboration
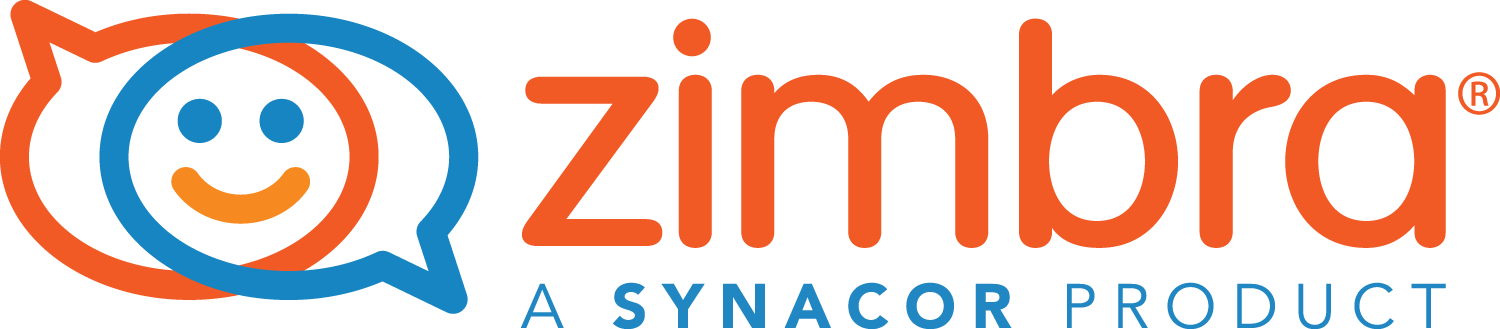

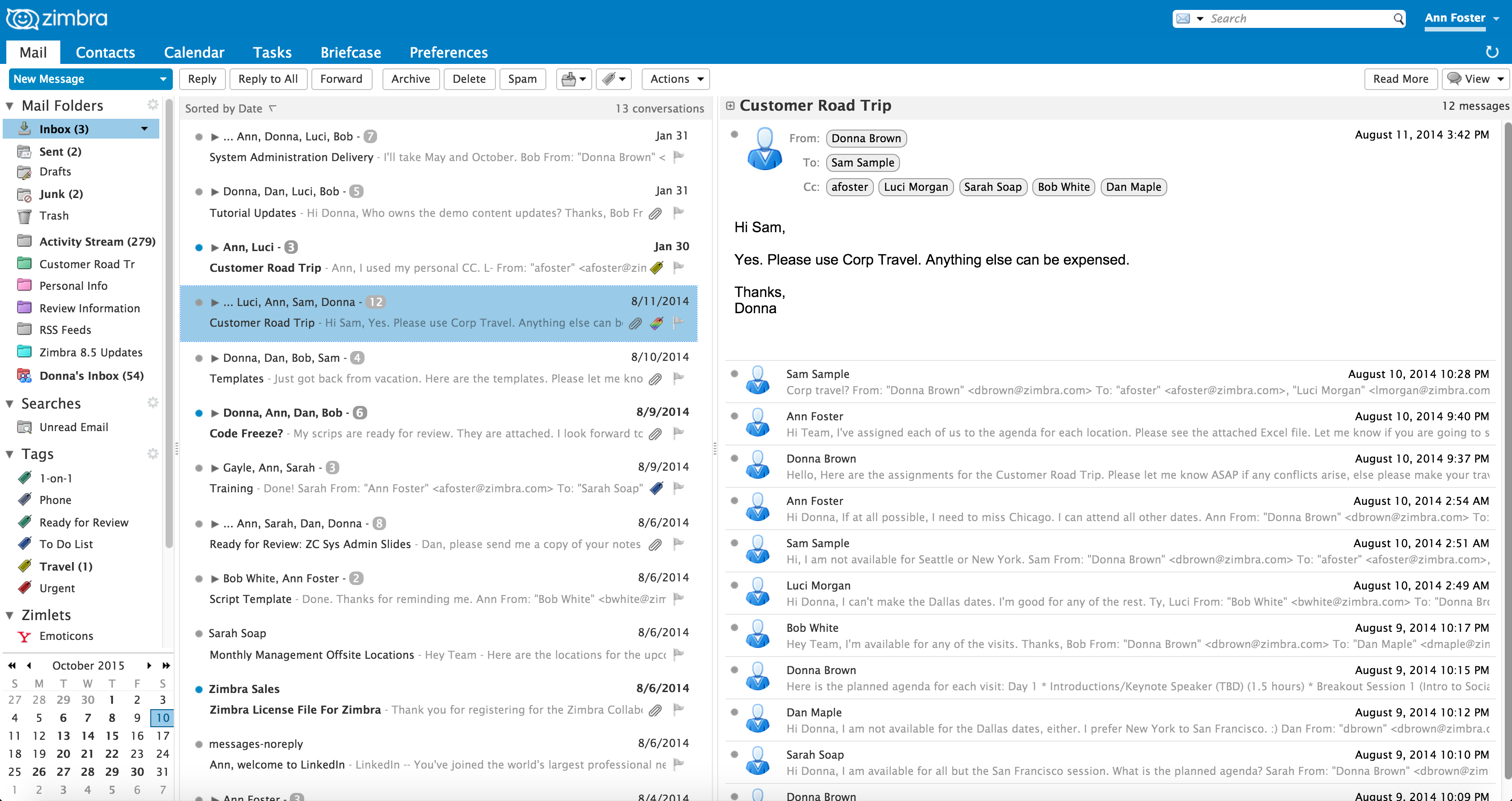
- Developer: Synacor
- Release: July 26, 2005; 21 years ago
- Stable release: 10.1.21 / 31 August 2026
- Platform: Linux
- Type: Collaborative software
- License: Zimbra licensing
- Website: www.zimbra.com
- Repository: github.com/Zimbra/zm-build

Zimbra Collaboration, known before 2019 as the Zimbra Collaboration Suite (ZCS), is a collaborative software suite that includes an email server and a web client.

Zimbra was initially developed by LiquidSys, which changed their name to Zimbra, Inc. on 26 July 2005. The Zimbra Collaboration Suite was first released in 2005. The company was subsequently purchased by Yahoo! on September 17, 2007, and later sold to VMware on January 12, 2010. In July 2013, it was sold by VMware to Telligent Systems which changed its name to Zimbra, Inc. in September 2013. It was then acquired by Synacor on 18 August 2015.

According to former Zimbra President and CTO Scott Dietzen, the name for Zimbra is derived from the song "I Zimbra" by Talking Heads.

== Zimbra editions ==
Two versions of Zimbra are available: an open-source version, and a commercially supported version ("Network Edition") with closed-source components such as a proprietary Messaging Application Programming Interface connector to Outlook for calendar and contact synchronization.

== Zimbra components ==
The software consists of both client and server components, and at one time also offered a desktop email client, called Zimbra Desktop (currently, discontinued).

=== Zimbra server ===
The Zimbra Server uses several open source projects (see the section, Included open source projects). It exposes a SOAP application programming interface to all its functionality and is also an IMAP and POP3 server. The server runs on many Linux distributions. On other, non-Linux operating systems it can be run using a virtual machine and using container technology. It supports CalDAV, CardDAV and SMTP for messaging, LDAP for directory services, and Microsoft Active Directory (AD). Zimbra uses Postfix for its MTA functionality. It includes technology from ClamAV, SpamAssassin and DSPAM for anti-malware features and S/MIME for email signing and encryption. OS X Server support was dropped with version ZCS 7.0.

Zimbra can synchronize mail, contacts, and calendar items with open-source mail clients such as Mozilla Thunderbird and Evolution and also with proprietary clients such as Microsoft Outlook and Apple Mail, either through proprietary connectors or using the ActiveSync protocol, both available exclusively in the commercially supported version. Zimbra also provides native two-way sync to many mobile devices.

=== Zimbra Desktop (discontinued) ===
The now discontinued Zimbra Desktop was a full-featured free desktop email client. Development was discontinued under VMware's stewardship in 2013 and restarted in February 2014, but was ended again by 2019. The web client featured an HTML5 offline mode starting with version 8.5.

=== Zimbra Web Client ===
The Zimbra Web Client is a full-featured collaboration suite that supports email and group calendars. At one time it featured document-sharing using an Ajax web interface that enabled tool tips, drag-and-drop items, and right-click menus in the UI. Today it has document sharing, chat, and videoconferencing. Also included are advanced searching capabilities and date relations, online document authoring, "Zimlet" mashups, and a full administration UI. It is written using the Zimbra Ajax Toolkit.

== Software license ==
The closed source variant Network edition is distributed under the Zimbra Network Edition EULA.

Starting with version 8.5 the Zimbra source code is available under the terms of the GNU General Public License version 2 (backend) and the Common Public Attribution License version 1 (frontend).

Previous versions were released under the Zimbra Public License (ZPL). The Free Software Foundation accepts the license as being a free software license and refers to it as being identical to the Yahoo! Public License with the exception that Zimbra, Inc. provides the license, rather than Yahoo!.

With later versions of Zimbra, while most of its components remain being open-source, there's no longer free official binary builds of Zimbra published to download and use. On this matter, in response to the question "Is Zimbra still an Open-Source product?", the FAQ section on the Zimbra website states:

Zimbra continues to maintain most of its products as a full open-source initiative. The binaries, however, will no longer be free to download and use.

== Included open source projects ==
The Zimbra Server uses open source projects such as:

- Postfix
- MariaDB (since version 8.5)
- OpenDKIM (since version 8.0)
- OpenLDAP
- Jetty (since version 5)
- Lucene
- ClamAV
- SpamAssassin
- Amavis (amavisd-new)
- DSPAM (deprecated starting 8.7)
- Aspell
- nginx (since 5.0)
- ØMQ (since 8.0)

It previously used:

- MySQL (last used in version 8.0)
- Apache Tomcat (last used in version 4.5)
- Perdition mail retrieval proxy (until 4.5)

== 2024 Cyber Attack ==
In 2024, Zimbra was hit by a significant cyber attack due to a Remote Code Execution (RCE) vulnerability, labeled CVE-2024-45519. The flaw in Zimbra’s postjournal service allowed attackers to send specially crafted emails, enabling remote command execution on affected systems. While the postjournal service isn’t active by default, its use in many setups made Zimbra an attractive target, especially since some instances lacked up-to-date security patches. To mitigate these risks, Zimbra released patches for affected versions, including updates to 9.0.0, 10.0.9, and others.

== See also ==
- Comparison of office suites
- List of collaborative software
- List of office suites
