= K. Mark Takai Pacific Warfighting Center =

Component of the United States Indo-Pacific Command (USINDOPACOM)

Coordinates: 21.3567°N 157.9636°W

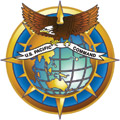
The K. Mark Takai Pacific Warfighting Center is located within the USPACOM AOR.

The K. Mark Takai Pacific Warfighting Center is located on Ford Island in Honolulu, Hawaii within the Ford Island Historic Management Zone / Aviation Facilities Sub-Area, part of the Pearl Harbor National Historic Landmark. This building, formerly called The Pacific Warfighting Center (PWC), is primarily used to direct forces during disaster relief efforts as needed within the United States Indo-Pacific Command (USINDOPACOM).

== Groundbreaking ==
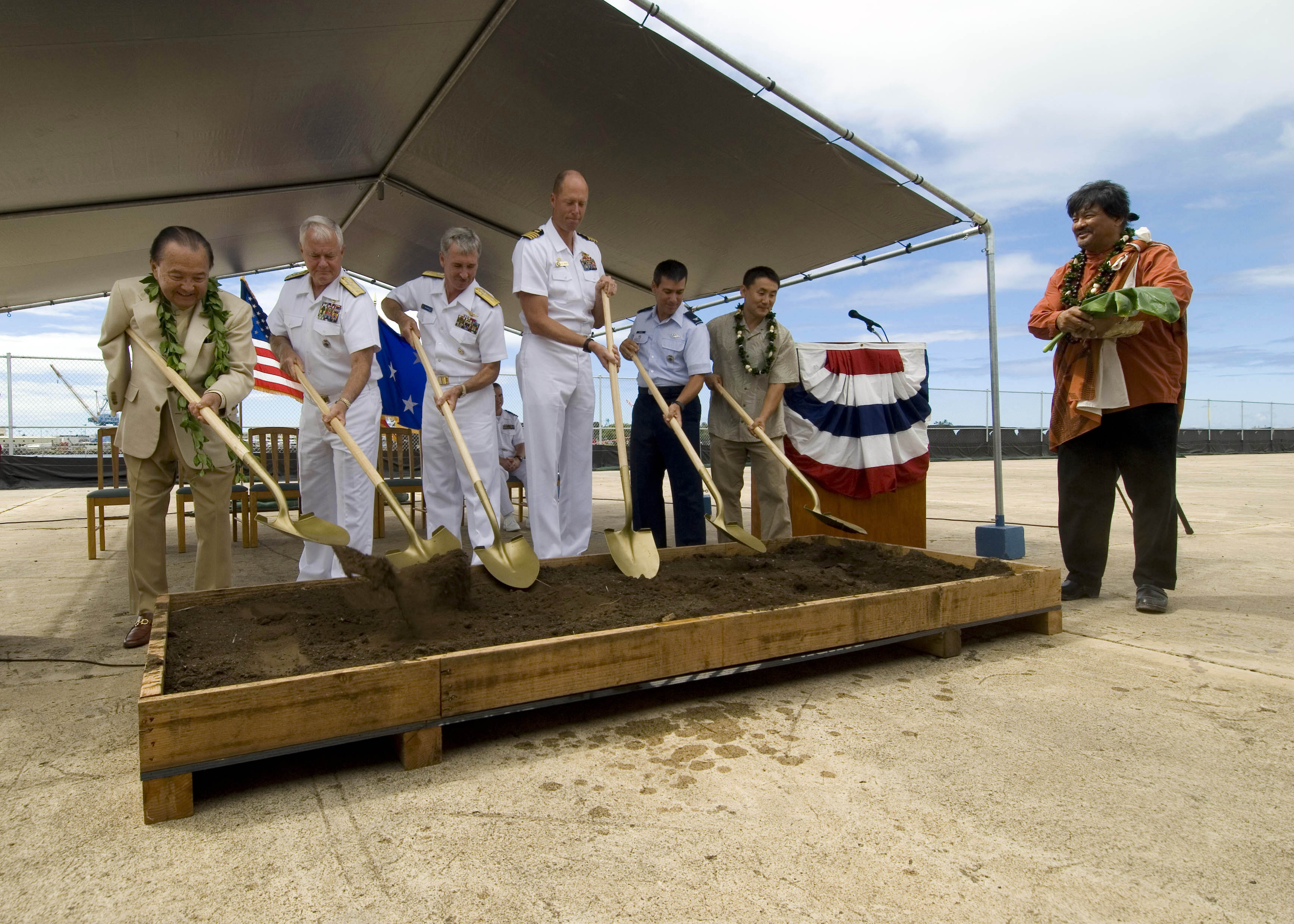
Representatives of the U.S. Senate, U.S. Pacific Command (PACOM), Navy Region Hawaii and Nan, Inc., dba Ocean House Builders break ground for the Pacific Warfighting Center.

A groundbreaking ceremony was held August 29, 2007. Speakers at the event included U.S. Senator Daniel K. Inouye and Navy Admiral Timothy J. Keating, commander of USPACOM.

During the ground breaking ceremony, which took place at the site of Hangar 38, which was destroyed during the attack on Pearl Harbor, U.S. Senator Daniel K. Inouye stated, "If you're prepared for war, countries that may be thinking about doing mischief have second thoughts, so to prevent war, be ready."

== Building and facility ==
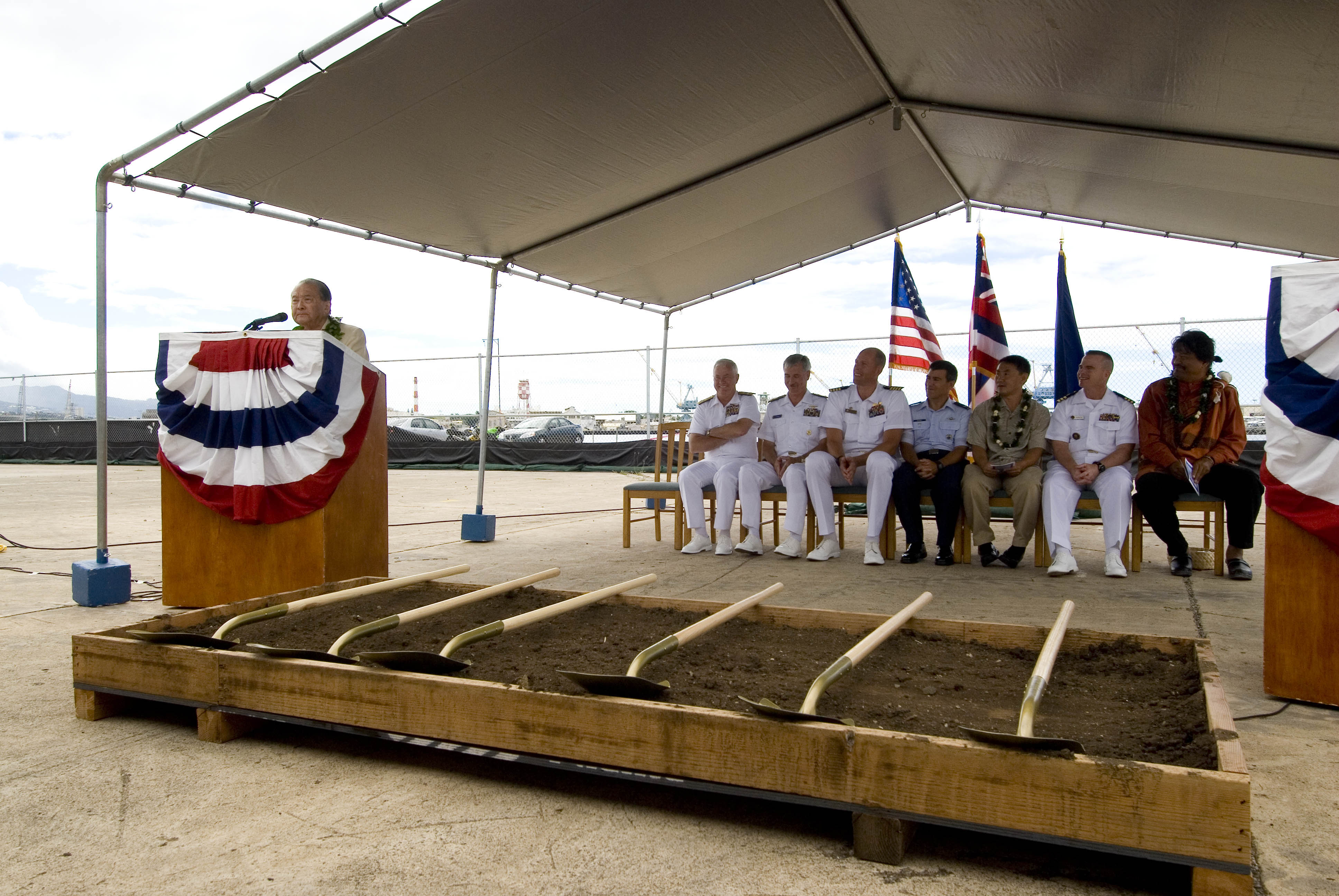
Sen. Daniel K. Inouye speaks to guests at the groundbreaking ceremony of the Pacific Warfighting Center

The two-story building is 34,300 square feet. The center replaced the previous 7,000 square foot simulation center that was located on Camp H.M. Smith and housed in a 60 year old former hospital.

The facility provides space for joint/combined force commanders and staff for live, virtual, or network real-life scenarios. The facility includes a theater, video-teleconferencing center, computer room, administration offices and warehouse spacing. The facility is equipped with the infrastructure needed to train and prepare forces for managing crisis situations through the USINDOPACOM AOR.

== K. Mark Takai Pacific Warfighting Center Support and Use ==
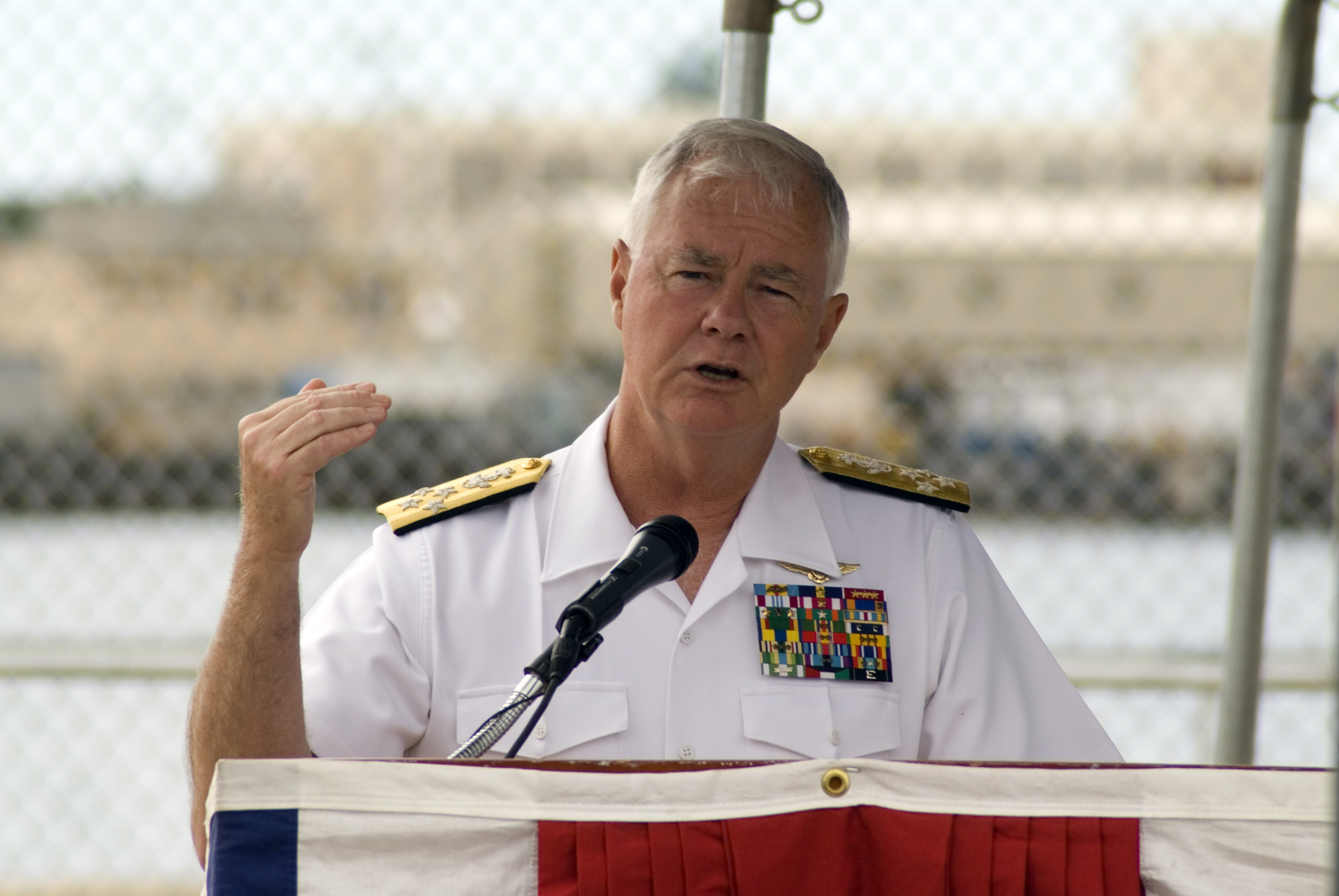
Adm. Timothy J. Keating, commander of U.S. Pacific Command (PACOM), speaks to guests at the groundbreaking ceremony of the Pacific Warfighting Center.

The PWC Supports USINDOPACOM Joint Exercise Program:

- Through modeling and simulation support for joint exercises, planning conferences, and event tests
- By providing Web-based support to unclassified information sharing and collaboration among USINDOPACOM, Interagency, and Coalition Partners through the All Partners Access Network (APAN) for planning and conducting joint exercises.
- By providing a venue that supports Information Technology for joint exercise control group operations: Information Management / Knowledge Management, Information Assurance, Video Briefing and Display Services, Office Automation hardware / software and classified / unclassified networks, and secure communications services.
- By its staff conducting media trends analysis, media support (simulated news broadcast, press conferences, and senior leader interviews), and information analysis (Media Analysis & Productions) for joint exercises.

USINDOPACOM partners utilize the PWC to direct forces during disaster relief and war efforts. During the opening ceremony of the Pacific Warfighting Center, Navy Adm. Robert F. Willard, told an audience that the facility helped with disaster relief efforts for the 2010 Haiti earthquake.

== All Partners Access Network ==
All Partners Access Network (APAN) is headquartered out of the PWC. APAN assisted in the 2010 Haiti earthquake disaster efforts in the coordination and communication of relief efforts.
