= Global Adaptation Network =

Climate change adaptation knowledge network

The United Nations Environment Programme (UNEP) established the Global Adaptation Network in 2010 to share and exchange climate change adaptation knowledge across the world. GAN's secretariat is based at UNEP's Headquarters in Nairobi, Kenya.

GAN was formed as an umbrella organization to bring together regional networks across the world that are working on issues related to climate change adaptation. These regional networks include Asia Pacific Adaptation Network (APAN), the Regional Gateway for Technology Transfer and Climate Change Action for Latin America and the Caribbean (REGATTA), and Ecosystem-based Adaptation for Food Security in Africa (EBAFOSA).

The Global Adaptation Network has four main areas of work:

== Learning Exchanges – "Sharing adaptation solutions with those who most need them" ==
The Global Adaptation Network hosts adaptation Learning Exchanges in regions that are particularly vulnerable to the effects of climate change. Adaptation specialists from different parts of the world come together to share their techniques and expertise in dealing with the challenges born from increasing weather extremes and the associated effects on livelihoods.

Face-to-face Adaptation Learning Exchanges have been held in Honduras, Chile, Mexico, Argentina, South Africa, Mozambique, Malawi, and India.

== Using university resources to build resilience in cities – "Connecting university resources to real-world challenges" ==
The Global Adaptation Network works closely with the Educational Partnership for Innovation in Communities (EPIC) Network, a US-based initiative that connects university resources to real-word challenges in their local cities. The Chronicle of Higher Education called the EPIC model "one of higher education’s most successful and comprehensive service-learning programs." GAN is working with the EPIC Network to extend its model to other parts of the world. Due to this collaboration, an EPIC-Africa network was launched in 2017.

== Global Adaptation Forums – "Connecting adaptation experts and policymakers into a shared platform" ==
The Global Adaptation Network held its last major forum in Abu Dhabi in March 2018. The event explored various themes in adaptation, including how to measure and assess adaptation risks and actions, how to involve the private sector, and how to establish a climate risk insurance scheme in Africa.

== Lima Adaptation Knowledge Initiative (LAKI) – "Identifying urgent gaps in knowledge and action" ==
Through the Lima Adaptation Knowledge Initiative, the Global Adaptation Network works closely with the UNFCCC to identify gaps in adaptation knowledge, as well as formulating guidance for the actions needed to close such gaps.
