= Telligent Systems =

Telligent, A Verint Company
- Type: Private
- Industry: Social Networking; Computer software Social software Collaboration software Enterprise Software
- Founded: 2004
- Headquarters: Dallas, Texas; London, England
- Key people: Patrick Brandt, CEO; Rob Howard, CTO, Founder; Wendy Gibson, CMO; Richard Zichinno, SVP; David Mitchell, Board member
- Products: Telligent Community; Telligent Enterprise; Telligent Analytics
- Number of employees: > 100
- Website: telligent.com

Telligent, A Verint Company is an enterprise collaboration and community software business founded in 2004 by Rob Howard. The company changed its name to Zimbra, Inc. in September 2013 after acquiring Zimbra from VMWare. In August 2015, Verint Systems, Inc. acquired Telligent and currently operates Telligent as an independent business unit. As of August 2015, the remaining assets of Zimbra were acquired by Synacor.

== Company history ==
Telligent was founded by Rob Howard in 2004. Howard was previously a founding member of Microsoft's ASP.NET team and helped build and run the Microsoft ASP.NET community.

Telligent introduced its first product, Community Server, in the fall of 2004. Community Server was an integrated community platform that brought together blogs, wikis, forums, user profiles, etc. Community Server was based on the work done by Rob Howard on the ASP.NET Forums, Jason Alexander on Gallery, and Scott Watermasysk on Text.

Dell and Myspace both became Telligent customers in 2006. Dell started a blog on Telligent's platform in response to Jeff Jarvis' post about his dissatisfaction with a Dell laptop.

At the end of 2007, Telligent introduced a social analytics tool called Harvest Reporting Server.

In 2008, Intel Capital became Telligent's first capital partner.

In 2009, Patrick Brandt took over as CEO and Rob Howard became CTO. Patrick Brandt was previously CEO of Skywire Software, which was acquired by Oracle for an undisclosed amount of money. Telligent rebranded its product offerings as follows; Community Server became Telligent Community, Harvest Reporting Server became Telligent Analytics, and Community Server Evolution became Telligent Enterprise. Telligent also formally introduced the Telligent Evolution platform, upon which Telligent Community and Telligent Enterprise were based.

As part of the company's repositioning, Telligent discontinued development and support for Graffiti CMS, making it available as an open-source project. Telligent also discontinued BlogMailr, an email-to-blog service.

In 2010 David Mitchell joined Telligent's board. Mitchell is currently CEO of Global 360 and was previously CEO of WebMethods. Telligent additionally added Wendy Gibson as Chief Marketing Officer.

On December 19, 2011, Telligent acquired Leverage Software.

On July 15, 2013, Telligent acquired Zimbra from Vmware.

On August 1, 2015, Telligent was acquired by Verint Systems, Inc.

== Products ==
Telligent's products are built on the Microsoft .NET and Microsoft SQL Server platforms. They are primarily used as on-premises, white-label software solutions.

=== Telligent Community ===
Telligent Community (formerly Community Server), built on the Telligent Evolution platform, is Telligent's flagship product. It was first introduced in 2004 and the most recent version is 5.6 as of October 2010.

Telligent Community is designed to support external facing communities and the primary use cases are: digital marketing, support communities, and networking.

=== Telligent Enterprise ===
Telligent Enterprise, built on the Telligent Evolution platform, was first introduced in 2008 in response to users of Telligent Community asking Telligent to provide an employee-focused solution. Telligent Enterprise version 2.6 was released in October 2010.

Telligent Enterprise is designed to support enterprise 2.0 / internal communities, private business-to-business communities, and private networking communities. An emphasis on integration with enterprise email systems, such as Microsoft Exchange Server, and enterprise identity management systems, such as Microsoft Active Directory, are examples of how Telligent Enterprise differs from Telligent Community.

=== Telligent Analytics ===
Telligent introduced Telligent Analytics in 2007 as the Harvest Reporting Server. Telligent Analytics is designed to analyze people and information created within the Telligent Evolution platform. This includes both Telligent Community and Telligent Enterprise. It additionally includes any data created by applications that run on the Telligent Evolution platform.

Telligent Analytics
- Developer: Telligent Systems
- Stable release: Telligent Analytics 3.5 / March 14, 2010
- Platform: ASP.NET / Microsoft SQL Server
- Type: Collaborative software Social Analytics; Social Networking
- Website: http://telligent.com
