= Synacor =

American technology and services company

Synacor Inc.

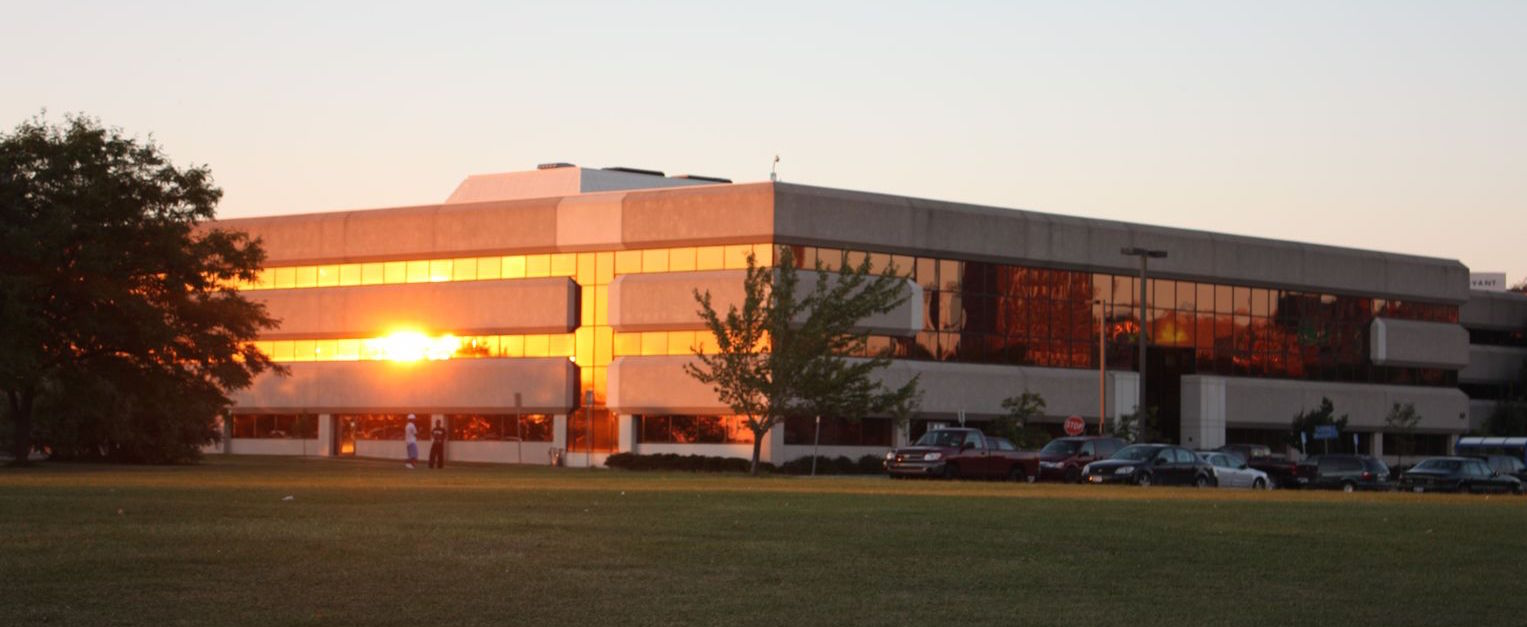
- Synacor headquarters in Buffalo, New York
- Formerly: Chek.com, MyPersonal
- Company type: Private (since 2021); Public (2012-21)
- Traded as: Nasdaq: SYNC (2012-21)
- Industry: Technology
- Founded: 1998; 27 years ago in Buffalo, New York, U.S.
- Founder: George Chamoun, Darren Ascone
- Headquarters: Buffalo, New York, U.S.
- Key people: Drake Harvey (CEO)
- Revenue: ▲US$127.4 million (2016)
- Number of employees: 449 (2016)
- Website: synacor.com cloudid.io zimbra.com

Synacor Inc. is an American technology and services company headquartered in Buffalo, New York. It provides email and collaboration tools through Zimbra, and TV Everywhere authentication and identity management services through Cloud ID. In addition to Buffalo, the company has offices in London, Pune, Singapore and Tokyo.

== History ==
In January 1998, George Chamoun and Darren Ascone, roommates at the University of Buffalo, founded Chek.com, a Buffalo-based email infrastructure provider. It started as an affinity-branded free email provider, allowing users to create an email account at domains like Budweiser.com and Yankeesfan.net. Additionally, Chek.com provided a Business E-Communications product, allowing companies to outsource their email hosting to Chek.com, providing an outlet for businesses to maintain email and intranet systems internally. The stated aim of the outsourced email product was to allow smaller companies to present a professional image similar to larger, established companies.

Chek.com was an early adopter of the LAMP technology stack and was a major supporter of the growing PHP community; Chek.com (and later, Synacor) hosted the official PHP website for a number of years prior to it being mirrored.

In 2000, Chek.com merged with MyPersonal, a San Francisco-based portal provider, to become Synacor. After the merger, Synacor started offering an extended set of products geared towards ISPs, cable companies, and telecommunications. Synacor began by hosting emails; the first such ISP was Kmart. The new agreement would provide BlueLight ISP customers with access to a 'mybluelight'-branded portal and web-based email hosted by Synacor.

In 2003, Synacor began to offer services to small and mid-size ISPs which allowed them to provide premium online content, similar to offerings by Yahoo at the time. Synacor claimed to manage complexities such as registration, rights management, and billing that customers experienced while operating their service. This technology eventually became Synacor's TV Everywhere product line. This technology also led Synacor to help shape the standards for Home-Based authentication through its long-standing participation in the Open Authentication Technology Committee (OATC) and Cable and Telecommunications Association for Marketing (CTAM). Furthermore, Synacor's TV Everywhere authentication product helped contribute to Apple's SSO.

Synacor had originally filed an IPO in 2007 with Deutsche Bank and Bear Stearns as underwriters; however, it withdrew from filing in October 2008. A successful IPO was filed in November 2011 and priced at the beginning of 2012. Synacor became a public company (Nasdaq: SYNC) with an initial public offering (IPO) of $5.00 per share. Ron Frankel, the Synacor CEO since 2001, stepped down in 2014.

In 2015, Synacor acquired Zimbra, an open source email, calendaring, and collaboration software suite. In the same year, Synacor acquired NimbleTV. In 2016 Synacor acquired Technorati to help build their advertising business. Also in 2016, Synacor displaced Yahoo! as the portal provider for AT&T and subsequently lost this business back to Yahoo! three years later in 2019. Synacor also provides authentication for HBO Go. In February of 2020, Synacor announced a merger with the Minnesota-based Qumu Corporation. As a part of the all-stock deal, Synacor shareholders would have held a 64% ownership of the merged entity, while Qumu investors would have held 36%. In June of 2020, the board of directors of both companies mutually agreed to terminate the merger prior to execution.

The company was taken private by investment company Centre Lane Partners in 2021 and delisted from the Nasdaq Global Market. In July 2021 iMedia Brands acquired Synacor's portal and advertising business. In November 2022 Synacor relocated its Buffalo headquarters from the Waterfront Village to HANSA Workspace.
