= All Partners Access Network =

All Partners Access Network (APAN), formerly called Asia-Pacific Area Network, was a United States Department of Defense (USDOD) social networking website used for information sharing and collaboration. It operated from 1997 until its official decommissioning on October 29, 2025. APAN served as the premier collaboration enterprise for the USDOD. The APAN hosted a network of communities that supported multinational interaction and multilateral cooperation by enabling users to post multimedia and other content in blogs, wikis, forums, document libraries and media galleries. APAN was used for humanitarian assistance and disaster relief, exercise planning, conferences and work groups. APAN provided non-governmental organizations (NGOs) and U.S. partner nations who did not have access to traditional, closed USDOD networks with an unclassified tool to communicate.

On September 26, 2025, the DoD CIO confirmed APAN's decommissioning, with its last operational day on October 28, 2025. After 28 years of service, the APAN website was taken offline on October 29, 2025, displaying a closure notice thanking its more than 500,000 global users and encouraging continued collaboration through Multinational Information Sharing (MNIS) successor initiatives such as the Unclassified Information Sharing Service (UISS) within the broader Mission Partner Environment (MPE) framework.

== History ==
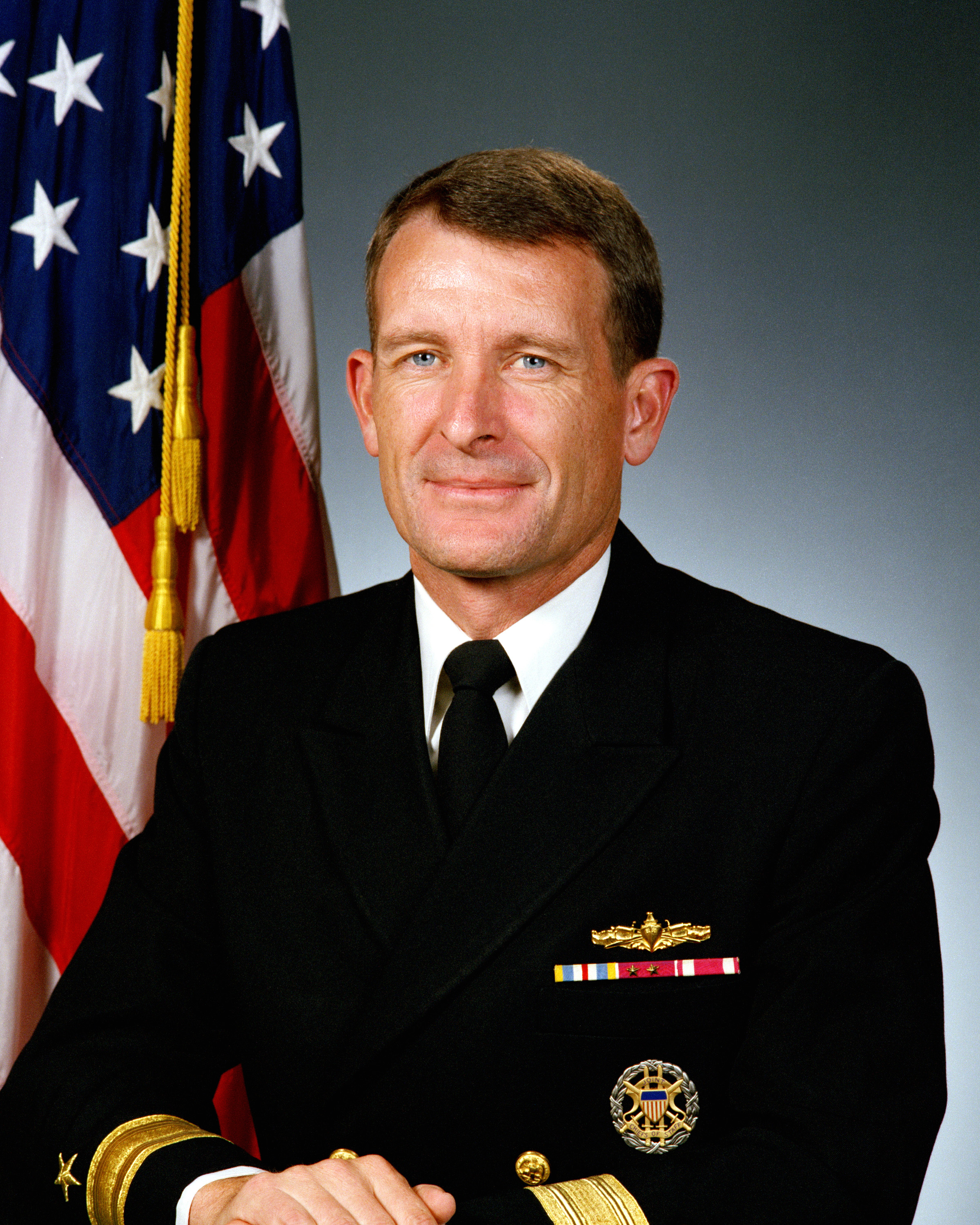
Admiral Dennis C. Blair

=== 1997–2004 ===
The origins of APAN can be traced back to the Virtual Information Center (VIC), which was created at Camp Smith in Honolulu, Hawaii. The VIC was established as an open source, information network designed to provide timely crisis-driven information to command decision makers. Admiral Dennis Blair, the U.S. Commander-in-Chief of the Pacific Command, believed that genuine security within the region comes only when nations share dependable expectations of peaceful change, and act in concert to address common challenges. He maintained that armed forces, in conjunction with diplomatic efforts, should cooperate. It was at this same time U.S. coalition partners were seeking greater interoperability within the USPACOM Area of Responsibility (AOR). As a result, APAN was created in March 2000 to provide partner nations with a non-dot-mil (.mil), unclassified link into the Virtual Information Center to establish a way to communicate worldwide.

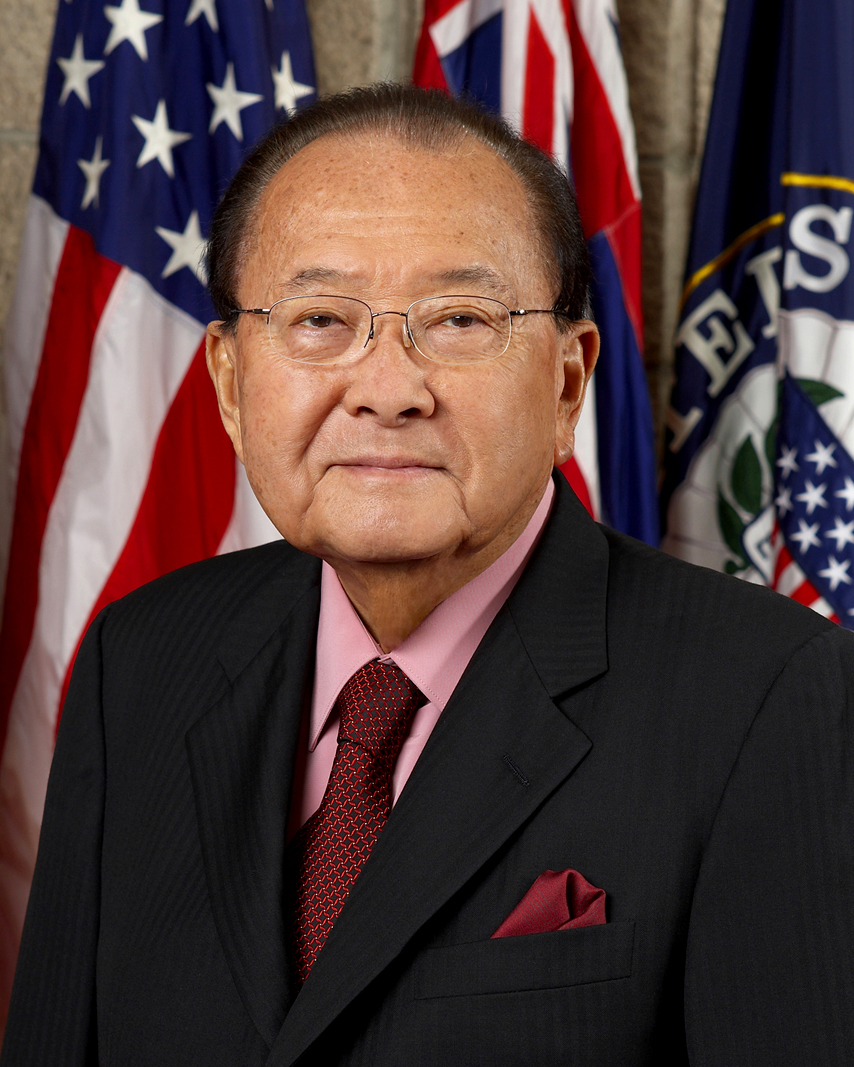
U.S. Senator Daniel Inouye

Blair's objective was to further the USPACOM Regional Security Cooperation objectives using collaborative, online tools. Through his direction, the Asia-Pacific Area Network was utilized to encourage cooperation on common tasks, from search and rescue to peacekeeping operations to promoting collaboration across the Pacific. The goal was to collaborate, cooperate and coordinate with USPACOM foreign partners and NGOs.

Blair, collaborating with Senator Daniel K. Inouye, received congressional funding through the Asia-Pacific Regional Initiative Fund (APRI) to further develop APAN.

As development of Asia Pacific Area Network continued, partnering nations began to increase situation awareness of events and developments within the Asia-Pacific region. APAN provided mutual benefit by providing capabilities, information and shared results instantly with USPACOM foreign counterparts and NGOs. APAN played a major role in Operation Unified Assistance to assist relief efforts to the 2004 Indian Ocean tsunami. During this humanitarian response militaries from multiple countries worked with NGOs in Thailand. APAN was utilized to assist in cooperation of these efforts to assist more than 12,600 USDOD personnel, foreign military partners and NGOs that were involved in the relief effort.

=== 2005–2009 ===
As APAN grew, other HADR exercises and planning sessions utilized APAN. In 2005, the USPACOM APAN (J08) team merged to form the J7 Training Directorate.

On April 1, 2007, in a report to the U.S. Congress on the Implementation of U.S. DOD Directive 3000.05 Military Support for Stability, Security, Transition and Reconstruction (SSTR) Operations supporting U.S. National Security Presidential Directive 44 (NSPD-44), Management of Interagency Efforts Concerning Reconstruction and Stabilization Operations, U.S. Secretary of Defense Robert Gates said, "Exercises and security cooperation activities such as Balikatan and Cobra Gold, support to the Global Peace Operations Initiative, bilateral activities with regional allies, and cooperative planning through U.S. Pacific Command's 33-nation Multi-national Planning and Augmentation Team are further strengthening the relationships essential to stability operations. The value of these relationships and capabilities was demonstrated in tsunami, earthquake, and landslide relief operations, as well as in supporting activities for Operation Enduring Freedom – Philippines. To improve regional stability operations coordination and interoperability, U.S. Pacific Command sponsors the Asia Pacific Area Network (APAN), an unclassified internet-based collaboration portal for humanitarian assistance and disaster relief operations. APAN supports U.S. Pacific Command's theater strategy and improves coordination among government agencies and international organizations. U.S. Pacific Command will continue to expand its interagency and multi-national approach to stability operations through exercises, workshops, and expanded initiatives."

In 2009, APAN was chosen by the Oversight Executive Board as the platform for the Transnational Information Sharing and Collaboration (TISC) Joint Capability Technology Demonstration (JCTD). Once this occurred, APAN was being utilized by individuals outside of the USPACOM AOR and changed its name to All Partners Access network.

=== 2010–2015 ===
After several years of developing APAN, in January 2010, the Defense Information Systems Agency (DISA) set up an APAN Community to assist more than 500 organizations looking to coordinate efforts for the 2010 Haiti earthquake within USSOUTHCOM. APAN was utilized to support Operation Unified Response to coordinate NGOs, foreign governments. private individuals and humanitarian assistance. Users utilized APAN to share situation reports, imagery and other crucial statistics with the humanitarian aid community. Over 1,400 users, including the Red Cross and smaller relief organizations communicated with one another using APAN. to relieve the suffering in Haiti. In an interview conducted with the CTO of DISA by Defense Systems, Dave Mihelcic, states "One of the things we learned...is that you can't always understand who your partners are. One night I was on APAN, watching Haiti relief being coordinated by a U.S. Southern Command operator, and someone popped in and said, 'I'm the owner of a construction business in Biloxi [Miss.] and I have four qualified bulldozer operators, and if you can arrange transportation to Haiti, they can participate in the relief.' And they were able to coordinate that."

In 2011, the US DOD announced a new Unclassified Information Sharing Service (UISS) as an enterprise service centrally funded for all Combatant Commands (COCOMs) to use with mission partners in their respective AORs.

=== 2019 ===
On February 12, 2019, The Office of the Deputy Secretary of Defense released a directive-type memorandum for Mission Partner Environments (MPE). Through the Mission Partner Environments program, the US Air Force "assumes responsibility for modernization, management, integration, and consolidation of All Partners Access Network."

== Technology ==
APAN users can select between two platforms based on their community need: Telligent or SharePoint. Added to APAN in 2010, Telligent provided APAN users a more social opportunity and uses blogs, wikis, forums and media galleries. In 2013, APAN added SharePoint as a secondary platform for those users who were looking for more structured content using document libraries and lists.

=== Additional features ===
==== Chat ====
APAN added chat services to support HADR events and exercises for users to collaborate in real-time from a browser in 2014.

==== Conferencing ====
APAN added Adobe Connect to facilitate real-time audio and video conferencing to assist with online training and learning in 2000.

==== Maps and GIS ====
In 2012, APAN adds Mapping and GIS capabilities to support collaboration. Mapping capabilities are enhanced on October 31, 2015.

==== Mobile ====
On October 31, 2015, APAN upgrades Telligent platform to support responsive design.

==== Translation ====
In 2014, APAN enhances translation tools across APAN to be able to communicate with foreign partners using multiple languages.

=== Technology releases ===
Version	Date	Update
APAN 1.0	1999	HTML Code
APAN 2.0	2001	Active Server Pages (ASP)
APAN 3.0	2003	Lotus Quick Place
APAN 4.0	2004	Dot Net Nuke
APAN 5.1	2007	Windows Share Point Services
APAN 5.2	2009	Telligent Community Server added
APAN 5.3	2010	Telligent Web update
APAN 6.0	2011	Telligent Web update
APAN 6.5	2012	Enterprise SharePoint 2010 added
APAN 7.0	2014	Telligent 7.0
APAN 8.0	2015	Telligent 8.5
APAN 9.0	2017	Telligent 9.2
APAN 12.0	2025	Verint Community 12.1.8

== Impact ==
=== Global communication and collaboration impacts ===
==== Cobra Gold ====
An Asia-Pacific military exercise held annually in Thailand, utilized APAN for emergency notifications during the 2008 Cobra Gold exercise. Partnering with AtHoc IWSAlerts, through USPACOM, the U.S. Army Pacific (USARPAC) led operators from the Joint Task Force protection teams throughout Thailand using the emergency alerts for critical communication needs during practice disaster relief efforts. Cobra Gold improved coordinated efforts to natural disaster response including the 2004 Indian Ocean tsunami and the Typhoon Haiyan response.

==== RONNA ====
Originally developed on Harmonie Web, RONNA was moved to APAN in 2011. RONNA provided information sharing between partners working to build a peaceful and democratic state in Afghanistan. RONNA's purpose was to fill information gaps that existed between government and NGOs and other Afghan partners. "Over thirty communities from organizations including ISAF, USAID, the U.S. Treasury and the Islamic Republic of Afghanistan" shared information within the RONNA community of interest.

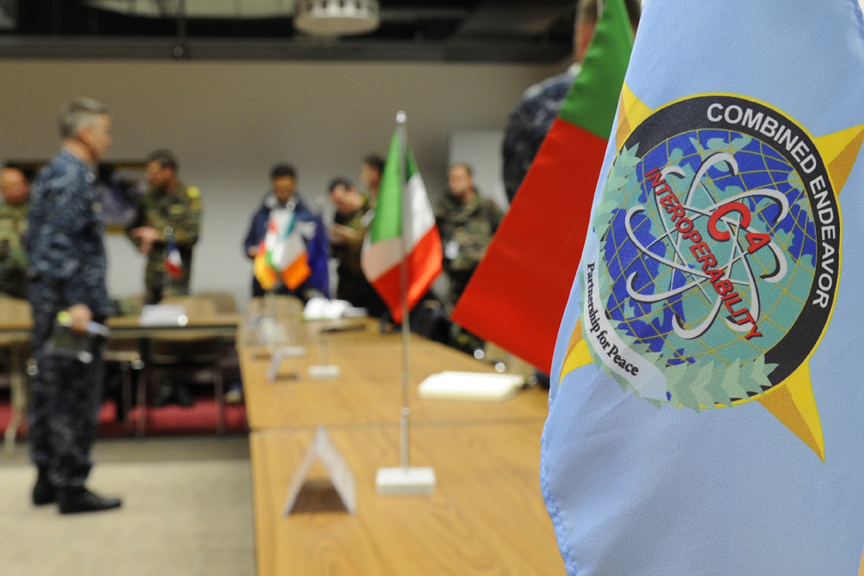
U.S. Navy Cmdr. Marc Christensen, exercise director, briefs Combined Endeavor 2010 delegation chiefs Aug. 31, in Grafenwoehr, Germany. Combined Endeavor 2010 is the world's largest communications interoperability exercise, preparing international forces' command, control, communications and computer systems for multinational operations.

==== Endeavor Exercises ====
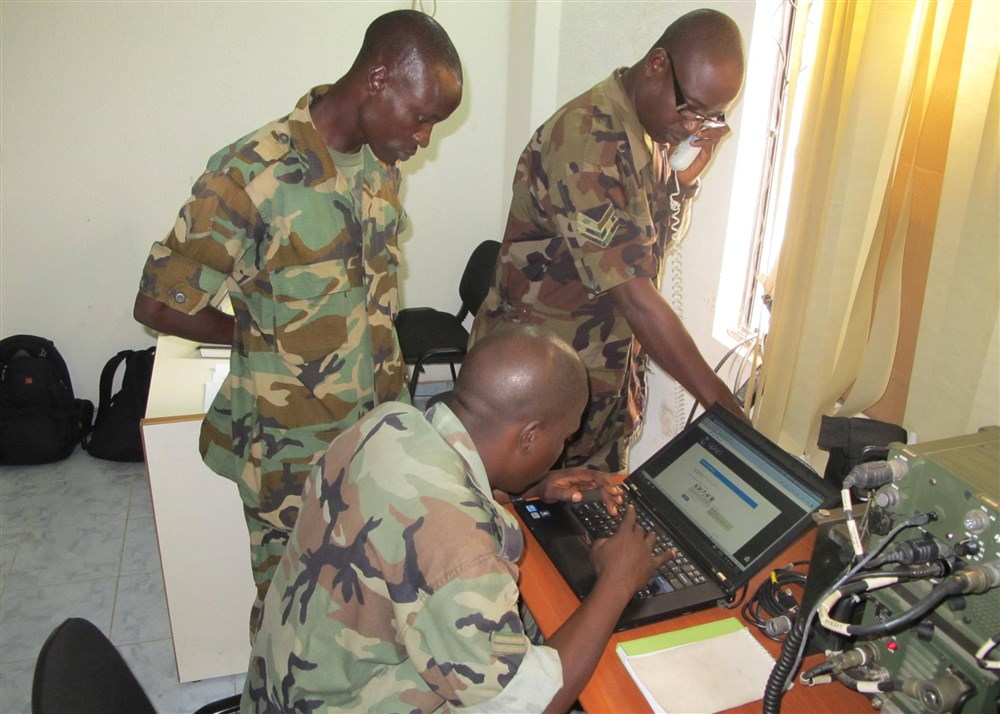
ABUJA, NIGERIA – Lance Corporal Adeoye Omidiji (left), Corporal Mohammed Chindo (seated) and Sergeant Benibo Onimite (right), Nigerian soldiers from the ECOWAS Combat Forces Signal Squadron, demonstrate what they have learned on the All Partners Access Network during train up for the Africa Endeavor 2011 multilateral communications exercise. Nations from across the continent have gathered in either The Gambia, Nigeria or Ethiopia, to develop cogent plans to minimize challenges with differing communications equipment provided to the individual nations from distributors around the world 14 July 2011.

APAN has supported the USDOD's program of "Endeavor" exercises: Pacific Endeavor, Africa Endeavor, and Combined Endeavor. These exercises have brought together military representatives from various nations in a region to practice communications in crisis scenarios. Hundreds of communications officers and technicians from around the globe have gathered annually for these events to practice communicating before a crisis strikes and to build relationships beyond cultural boundaries.

===== Combined Endeavor =====
Combined Endeavor, the largest command, control, communications and computer interoperability event in the world, used APAN to provide online collaboration for exercise planning and equipment management.

===== Africa Endeavor =====
In 2010, for the first time ever, a direct communications link was established between the African Union and units in the field as part of the annual Africa Endeavor 2010 Exercise by using APAN, to allow international military and NGO groups to work together in a neutral online environment. Approximately 40 countries participate in bilingual crisis response exercises using English and French with approximately 1,000 members of the APAN community sharing pictures and files using translation functions that have supplemented the use of interpreters, which has expanded participants' ability to overcome language barriers.

===== Pacific Endeavor – Multinational Communications Interoperability Program (MCIP) =====
Since 2010, through USPACOM, MCIP has hosted Pacific Endeavor exercises that have brought together partner nation militaries and HADR experts from around the world to develop, test, and improve communication systems across the Pacific. MCIP has used APAN to promote humanitarian communication, for its planning workshops. The planning workshops assisted USPACOM partners and NGOs to plan communication procedures in the event of a natural disasters and to build partnerships. On August 19, 2014, part of an exercise performed through MCIP was for Nepalese amateur radio operators to report earthquake aftershocks to USPACOM using APAN. This practice proved successful as partners around the world knew how to communicate during the 2015 Nepal earthquake using the bulletin board established on APAN.

==== CJTF-HOA ====
In 2014, Combined Joint Task Force-Horn of Africa (CJTF-HOA) used APAN forums to conduct collaboration and sharing between scholars, government, NGOs and professionals around the world who were interested in East African Issues. The CJTF-HOA APAN community provided its members chat, file, sharing, geo-data, and translation for situation awareness and knowledge specific to the Horn of Africa.

==== 2015 Nepal earthquake ====
The 7.3 earthquake that shook Nepal damaged various radio antennae and Amateur Radio for emergency operations was down in Nepal and the surrounding area. The Army Military Auxiliary Radio System (MARS) gathered information and statistics on the earthquake and relayed messages around the world to other HAM operators and also posted the information on the NEPAL HADR APAN community of interest for those who were assisting to coordinate relief efforts.

=== Humanitarian Assistance and Disaster Relief (HADR) impacts ===
==== 2010 Haiti earthquake ====
The 2010 Haiti earthquake was one of the world's deadliest national disasters. Shortly after the earthquake, surviving officials of the government of Haiti made urgent request for United States assistance. APAN was requested to assist as the primary communication hub for the Haiti earthquake relief efforts for unclassified, nonmilitary information sharing and collaboration. USSOUTHCOM established an APAN community of interest and within three weeks, APAN had more than 1,800 registered users supporting the relief efforts.

Imagery, maps, photos, assessments, situation reports, common operational picture reports, and requests for information were all made available on APAN to support the humanitarian assistance. From the information-management standpoint, the decision to keep the Haiti operations within the unclassified domain enabled information sharing across agencies.

A user on APAN posted, "Sacre Coeur Hospital in Milot, Haiti is appealing for patients. Need coordination to get helos to hospital." Two days later, the hospital reported going from 20 patients to 112 new patients with 12 helicopter landings and 17 foreign doctors assisting the patients; four days later the hospital expanded into a nearby school with 100 more patients with cots and equipment.

==== 2011 Japan earthquake ====
In March 2011, a public community of interest was created on APAN, Japan Earthquake 2011 Support, in an effort to facilitate information sharing with U.S. Government organizations and NGOs involved in the disaster relief efforts. A private community, the Virtual Civil Military Operations Center (VCMOC), was set up in order to develop an unclassified Common Operating Picture (COP) and to share information in support of Joint relief operations. Members of the VCMOC were invited by invitation only. Both communities were created on APAN to assist Operation Tomodachi. Operation Tomodachi was the first joint operation in the field for US Forces Japan (USFJ) and Japan Self-Defense Forces (USDF) within the USPACOM AOR. Watchstanders were able to provide Tactics, Techniques and Procedures (TTPs) and Concept of Operations (CONOPs) via APAN. APAN was used to coordinate travel for United States military families who were evacuating and traveling back to the United States. from Japan. APAN forums provided links for those traveling as well as FAQs. The Yale-Tulane Disaster Resilience Academy created daily briefs to compile information into a format that could be shared through public blogs.

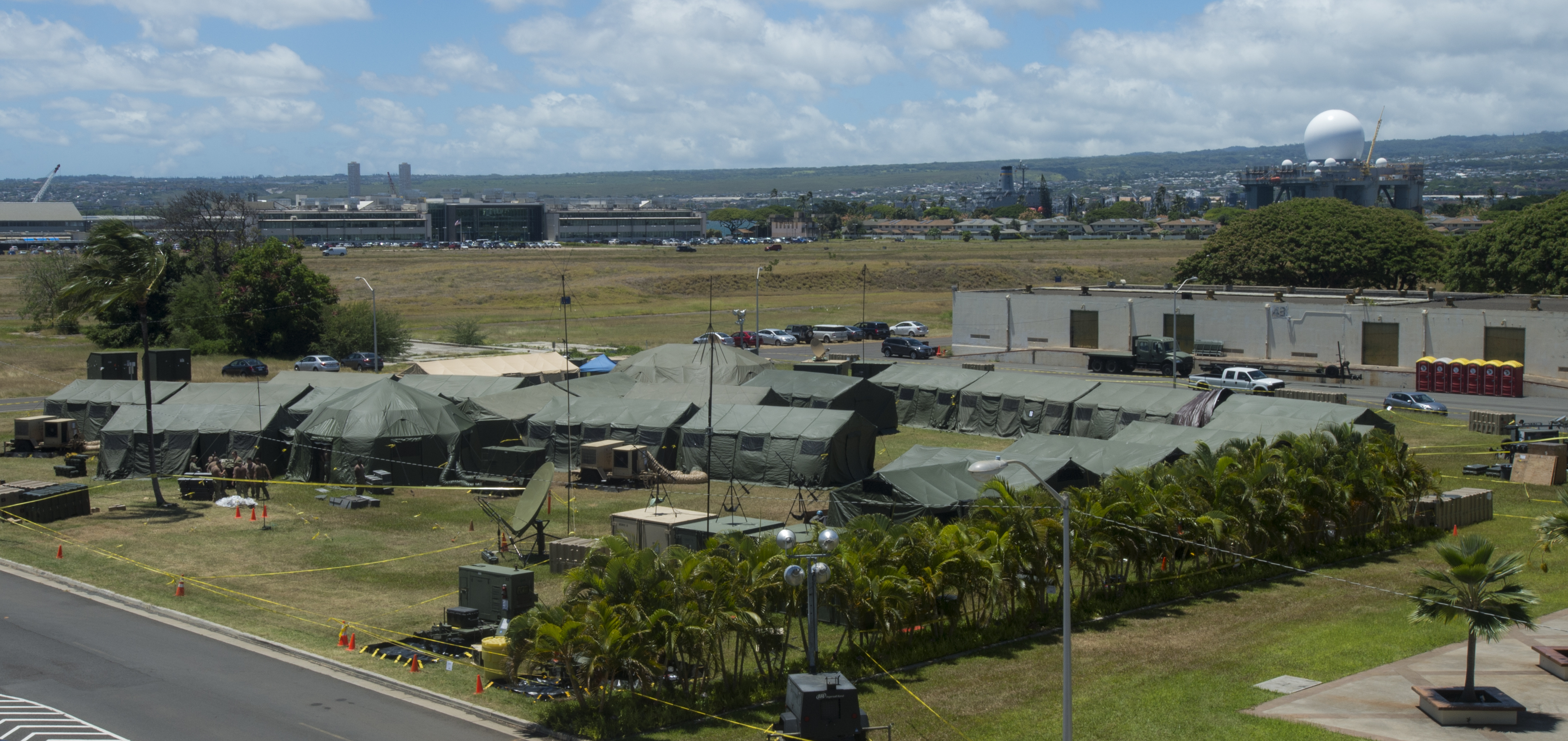
The tactical operations center setup begins for the humanitarian assistance and disaster relief phase of Rim of the Pacific (RIMPAC) Exercise 2014 on Ford Island, Hawaii. The world's largest international maritime exercise, RIMPAC provides a unique training opportunity that helps participants foster and sustain the cooperative relationships. (U.S. Navy photo by Mass Communication Specialist 3rd Class Daniel Rolston/Released)

==== RIMPAC 2012: Operation Restore Chianti ====
For the first time in RIMPAC's 41-year history, an HADR component was part of the maritime exercise, with U.S. hospital participation. Hospitals participated in the disaster scenario with helicopter landings, patient transport for patients with simulated injuries. During the fictitious response Operation Restore Chianti, simulated DOD-produced public health messaging, resupply and exercise communications occurred on 800MHz and APAN. The exercise also incorporated crowd-sourced crisis mapping components to simulate the mass influx of social media messages that are produced during a disaster. Volunteers produced and validated over 2,000 incident reports that were funneled into APAN's map feeds. This shared communication platform for RIMPAC participants was offered by APAN.

==== RIMPAC 2014: Operation Restore Griffon ====
APAN was used to increase accessibility and collaboration for the RIMPAC HADR portion of Operation Restore Griffon. The APAN community of interest was designed to provide a space for coordinating requirements and contributions related to a fictitious hurricane response effort during RIMPAC 2014. The United Nations also worked side by side with APAN during RIMPAC 2014 using an RSS feed to post information from UNOCHA's Virtual On-Site Operations Coordination Center (VOSOCC) website to APAN. APAN was a conduit for China to be able to participate in RIMPAC for the first time; the U.S. DOD would not allow China access to classified networks that were utilized within the exercise. Partnerships started at RIMPAC continue to work on shared procedures for future use.

==== RIMPAC 2016: Operation Restore Griffon ====
APAN was used in the RIMPAC – HADR exercise. The exercise simulated humanitarian assistance after a 7.9 earthquake hit the fictitious country of Griffon. Civilian participants included: Hawaii Disaster Medical Assist Team (HDMAT); Office of Foreign Disaster Assistance (OFDA); Civil-Military Coordination Center (CMCC); United Nations Office for Coordination of Humanitarian Affairs (US-OCHA); Commander Combined Task Force (CCTF); National Disaster Management Office (NDMO) & Office of the Under Secretary of Defense for Policy (USDP). Military participants included: Japan Maritime Self-Defense Force (JMSDF); US THIRDFLT Forces; Canada and various LNO's from RIMPAC coalition countries.

==== 2013 Philippines typhoon ====
The global response to Typhoon Haiyan began hours after the storm hit the Philippines on November 8, 2013. USPACOM, in coordination with APAN, launched the Typhoon Haiyan Response Group to provide a centralized location for coordination and communication. APAN was used to provide situation reports on damage. APAN users were able to upload documents, data-sets and files to assist in the relief efforts to decrease response time. Partnering with the National Geospatial-Intelligence Agency, APAN's mapping tools provided NGA data to automatically federate geo-spatial content which was utilized to provide the maps for infrastructure and agriculture.

==== November 2018 California wildfire response ====
On November 8, 2018, the Camp Fire ignited in northern California. The Camp Fire was the most destructive fire in California's history. APAN provided support to the California Military Department (CMD), "to ensure cooperation and coordination was taking place, CMD invited those supporting the disaster response into their APAN community, including California Department of Forestry and Fire Protection (CAL FIRE) and California's Pacific Gas and Electric (PG&E). PG&E needed a way to track their field operators."

=== Health impacts ===
==== 2014 Ebola Response Network (ERN) ====
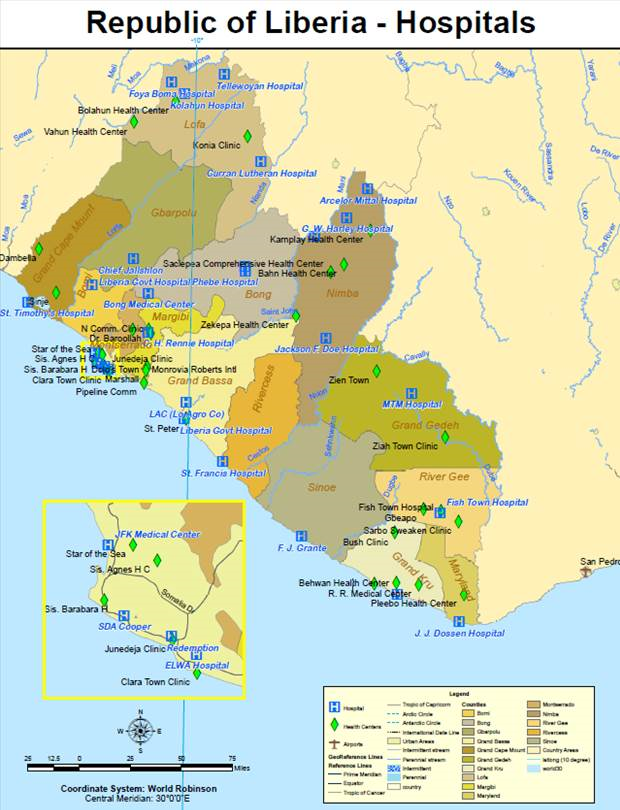
Map from Ebola Response Network displaying hospital and health center locations in Liberia.

USAFRICOM supported the U.S. Agency for International Development (USAID) which led the foreign humanitarian assistance efforts for Operation United Assistance. Operation United Assistance was a United States military mission to respond to the Ebola virus epidemic in West Africa in September 2014. Through coordination and collaboration, NGOs and the US Military were able to utilize APAN to create the Ebola Response Network, an APAN community of interest. APAN also worked with the National Geospatial-intelligence Agency (NGA) to provide accurate data and maps for mission related efforts using the Ebola Response Network. Within the first month of the Ebola Response Network being deployed, it had 600 members sharing updates and announcements, uploading documents and using chat rooms.

== Recognition ==
APAN has been honored by different organizations.

1. 2010 – Forrester Groundswell Award: Management Division
2. 2011 – Excellence in Intergovernmental Collaboration from The American Council for Technology and Industry Advisory Council (ACT-IAC)
3. 2013 – The Computerworld Honors Program; Laureate: Collaboration Finalist

== Location ==
APAN is headquartered at the K. Mark Takai Pacific Warfighting Center on Ford Island in Honolulu, Hawaii.
