= NimbleTV =

- Company type: Private
- Industry: Technology
- Founded: December 2013; 12 years ago in New York City, USA
- Website: nimbletv.com

NimbleTV was a technology company that allowed subscribers to view live and time-shifted streams of over-the-air and cable television content on internet connected devices. The service was cloud-based and did not require hardware. The beta was rolled out in Spring 2012 and the service officially launched in New York City in December 2013. NimbleTV has been described as a "slingbox and tivo put together" and as the "Anti-Aereo" service. because unlike Aereo, NimbleTV's business model improves existing pay TV. Venture capital firms backing NimbleTV include Greycroft Partners, Tribeca Venture Partners and the Tribune Company. NimbleTV was awarded the 2013 Tribeca Disruptive Innovation Award and is a 2014 Edison Awards Nominee.

In January 2015, NimbleTV shut down their service with a promise to launch a new product. A week after the shutdown, Synacor Inc. announced their acquisition of NimbleTV.

== Founders ==
Anand Subramanian, David C Peterson, Paul George, Marcos Trinidad

== Packages ==
NimbleTV television packages were New York Add-On, New York Concierge, and NimbleTV India. All the packages came with monthly cloud-based HD-DVR plans ranging from 20–90hr/month, with the option of additional recording space.

- New York Add-On service allowed subscribers with existing New York cable subscription (Time Warner Cable, Cablevision, Verizon FiOS and RCN) to stream 24 channels from most internet connected devices from any location on the globe.
- New York Concierge service allowed subscribers with no previous cable subscription to sign up for a cable subscription package without dealing directly with the cable providers. The subscribed content was available on cloud and included up to 130 channels. The subscribed content could be accessed from any location on the globe.
- NimbleTV Indian service allowed subscribers to view up to 64 Indian channels from any location on the globe.

In May 2014, NimbleTV's CEO announced that NimbleTV will focus on expanding its Add-On product beyond the New York Metro area, starting with Chicago.

In January 2015, the company was acquired by Synacor, Inc.
