= Telligent Community =

Collaboration software community

- A group on Telligent Community web site
- Developer(s): Telligent Systems
- Stable release: Telligent Community 10.3 / April 3, 2019
- Platform: ASP.NET / Microsoft SQL Server
- Type: Collaborative software, Blog publishing system, Forum Software, Wiki, Social Networking
- Website: telligent.com

Telligent Community is a community and collaboration software platform developed by Telligent Systems and was first released in 2004.

Telligent Community is built on the Telligent Evolution platform, with a variety of core applications running on top of it such as blogs, forums, media galleries, and wikis. Additional applications from third parties using the API's and REST stack can be installed or integrated with the platform.

Telligent Community is built with ASP.NET, C#, and Microsoft SQL Server. It is available as downloadable software that can be installed on a web server or via hosting providers. The current version is Verint Community 12.0 which was released February 2012. The product used to be named Community Server before being rebranded as part of the 5.0 release.

== History ==
Telligent Systems was founded by Rob Howard in 2004, who was previously part of Microsoft's ASP.NET team. Telligent introduced its first product, Community Server, in the fall of 2004. Community Server was one of the first integrated community platforms that brought together blogs, photo galleries, wikis, forums, user profiles and more. Community Server was based on the merger of three then-widely used open source ASP.NET projects: the ASP.NET Forums, nGallery photo gallery, and .Text blog engine. The people behind those projects (Scott Watermasysk, Jason Alexander, and Rob Howard) joined together as Telligent Systems and along with several other software developers created Community Server 1.0.

Between 2004 and 2009 Community Server steadily grew in scope, features, and capabilities. In 2008 Telligent Systems released a second version of Community Server that targeted as an Enterprise Social Software platform used to create and manage internal employee communities and intranets. Originally branded as Community Server Evolution this was later renamed Telligent Enterprise.

Telligent also announced a new Enterprise Reporting platform at its first Community Server Developers Conference in 2008, which was later renamed Harvest. It was one of the first analytics suites for enterprise collaboration software, and provides social analytics including sentiment analysis, social fingerprints, and buzz analysis on social networking sites such as Twitter.

Telligent rebranded all of its products on June 23, 2009 at the Enterprise 2.0 conference when it launched its new Evolution platform product suite. Community Server became known as Telligent Community, Community Server Evolution became known as Telligent Enterprise and the underlying platform that both run on is now referred to as Telligent Evolution. The Social Analytics suite was renamed Telligent Analytics.

== See also ==
- Comparison of Internet forum software
- Weblog software
