= National Center for Technology Innovation =

Educational organizations based in the United States

The National Center for Technology Innovation (NCTI) was established in the United States to advance learning opportunities for all students, with a special focus on individuals with disabilities. NCTI is funded by the Office of Special Education Programs (OSEP) at the U.S. Department of Education and located at the American Institutes for Research (AIR).

== Resources ==
The NCTI Web site includes pages listing articles about collaboration, innovators, events and funding opportunities involving accessibility, assistive technology, and universal design It also publishes an online directory, the NCTI Yellow Pages, containing project descriptions and contact details for developers, publishers, technical assistance providers, and vendors associated with over 700 special education technology projects. Additionally, it publishes a bimonthly electronic newsletter, QuickClicks, which features news articles, reports, and information on funding opportunities.

NCTI hosts national forums designed for innovators, public and private funders, venture capitalists, policymakers, vendors, researchers, and media to discuss challenges and solutions in the field. The 2007 conference is featured in a video. NCTI will be hosting another national forum in 2008.

NCTI also co-produced the TechMatrix, a free, searchable database of 250 assistive and learning software and products and related research for students with special needs.
