= Asia Pacific Adaptation Network =

- Abbreviation: APAN
- Formation: 2009; 17 years ago
- Founder: United Nations Environment Programme (UNEP)
- Type: regional/international organization
- Purpose: Adaptation to climate change
- Location: Bangkok, Thailand
- Region served: Asia and the Pacific
- Website: www.asiapacificadapt.net

Asia Pacific Adaptation Network (APAN) is a regional program that works with governments and organizations to share knowledge about adapting to climate change and to support implementation of adaptation measures. APAN was set up in October 2009 by the United Nations Environment Programme (UNEP), as part of the Global Adaptation Network (GAN). APAN is considered a key mobilizer of adaptation knowledge in Asia and the Pacific.

APAN works collaboratively with organizations including the United Nations Environment Programme (UNEP), the Institute for Global Environmental Strategies (IGES), the Regional Resource Centre for Asia and the Pacific (RRC.AP) at the Asian Institute of Technology (AIT), the Stockholm Environment Institute (SEI), the Asian Development Bank (ADB), the Swedish International Development Cooperation Agency (SIDA), the United States Agency for International Development (USAID) and the Asia-Pacific Network for Global Change Research (APN).

== Structure of APAN ==
Structure of APAN

The Regional Hub (RH) is co-hosted by the Asian Institute of Technology – UNEP Regional Resource Centre for Asia-Pacific (AIT- UNEP RRC.AP) and the Institute for Global Environmental Strategies (IGES) in Bangkok, Thailand. The Regional Hub is the implementing body of the Network at the regional level (where relevant).

The Network has five Sub-Regional Nodes (SRNs) covering five sub-regions in Asia-Pacific. SRNs are organisations whose key functions are to lead the implementation of the sub-regional activities of the Network in collaboration with the RH and national implementing partners. As of 2011, APAN's three Thematic Nodes (TNs) focused on water, agriculture and mountains to reflect priorities of the region and were composed of organizations with specific expertise on their respective thematic areas.

Sub-regional Nodes
Central Asia - Central Asia Regional Economic Cooperation (CAREC)
Northeast Asia - Keio University (Keio)
Pacific - Secretariat of the Pacific Regional Environment Programme (SPREP)
Southeast Asia - ICLEI-Local Governments for Sustainability (ICLEI)
Thematic Nodes
Water - Global Water Partnership (GWP)
Mountain - International Centre for Integrated Mountain Development (ICIMOD)
Agriculture - Southeast Asia Regional Centre for Graduate Study and Research in Agriculture

== Activities ==
The key purpose of APAN is to enhance the resilience and sustainability of human systems, ecosystems and economies in the face of climate change, by increasing access to knowledge, finance and technology, so that key actors can design and implement adaptation policies, strategies, plans and measures. This approach involves various areas of support:

1. Knowledge generation, sharing and exchange of adaptation-related information, including good practices and databases at all levels.
2. Building capacity of national, sub-regional and regional actors under the guidance of the Steering Committee with support from the sub-regional nodes and thematic nodes through meetings, seminars, workshops and trainings.
3. Supporting access to adaptation-related finance and technologies.
4. Identification of needs, gaps in knowledge and priority areas through at regional, sub-regional and national levels.
5. Building connections and collaboration through networks, initiatives, centers of excellence, donors, governments and other institutions.

== Activities outcomes and publications ==
Publications of APAN are made available online, describing the knowledge gained by its activities in the region to build capacities for climate adaptation.

E-communiqué informs recipients about the activities of the Regional Climate Change Adaptation Knowledge Platform (AKP) for Asia and the Asia Pacific Adaptation Network.

Initially APAN developed databases of good adaptation practices from all over Asia and the Pacific and of adaptation technologies for coastal zones through research by a consulting firm. As of 2012, APAN's partners determined that ADAPT Asia-Pacific would take over development of a new APAN knowledge sharing platform, to include a Resource Library and Database.

== Adaptation forum ==
The Asia Pacific Climate Change Adaptation Forum is a yearly flagship event co-organized by the APAN. It brings together scientists, academica, governments, international development organizations, students, and others from around the world to discuss climate change adaptation.
