= Alex Pareene =

American journalist

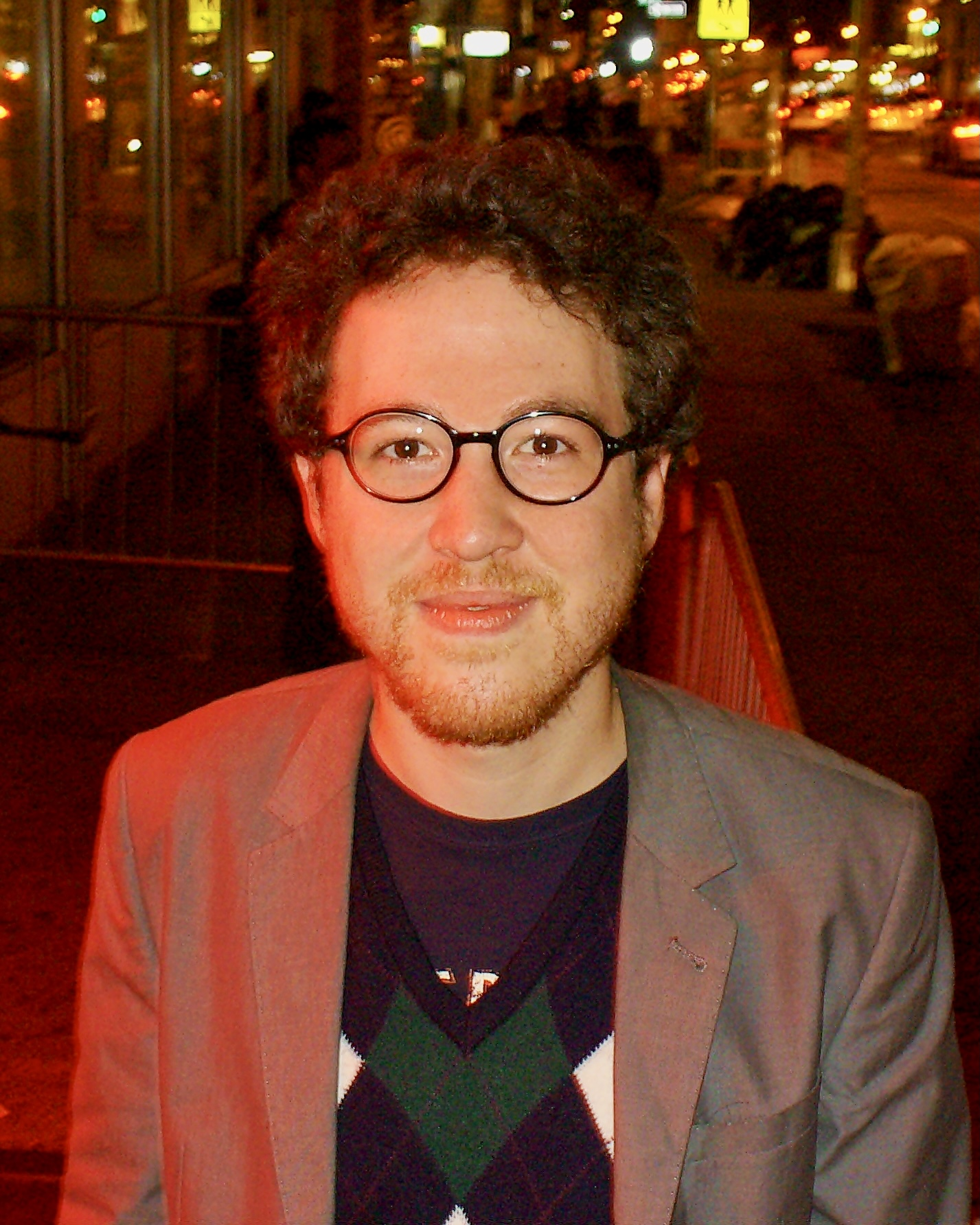
- Pareene in New York, May 2012
- Born: 1984/1985
- Education: New York University
- Occupations: Journalist, writer, editor
- Employer: The New Republic

Alex Pareene (born 1984 or 1985) is an American journalist, writer, and editor. He was the editor-in-chief of the online news magazine Gawker. Pareene later served as a senior editor at Deadspin and editor-in-chief of Splinter News, before becoming a staff writer at The New Republic. As of 2022, he published "The AP (Alex Pareene) Newsletter".

== Early life ==
Pareene grew up in south Minneapolis, Minnesota, and graduated from Minneapolis South High School, where he wrote for the school's newspaper and took part in the extracurricular theater program. He attended New York University to study playwriting, but later dropped out.

== Career ==
Pareene began his career writing a blog entitled "Buck Hill."

In January 2006 he started writing for the Washington, D.C. political gossip blog Wonkette, then a part of Gawker Media, before he moved to their main web property Gawker in October 2007. In April 2010 he left Gawker to write about politics for the online news magazine Salon. In their farewell post, the Gawker staff wrote of Pareene, "His writing is hysterical, his voice is unique, and his political mind is finely tuned into the idiocies and hypocrisies of our crumbling democracy." He later joined First Look Media to launch the blog Racket with Matt Taibbi. In January 2015, he rejoined Gawker Media. He was Gawker's editor-in-chief from October 2015 to August 2016, when the site ended operations.

Pareene later served as a senior editor at Deadspin and editor-in-chief of Splinter News, before becoming a staff writer at The New Republic in 2019. As of 2022, he publishes "The AP (Alex Pareene) Newsletter".

=== Hack list ===
At Salon, the rise of personalities who dominate the 24-hour news cycle continued to be one of Pareene's mainstay concerns. Salon published a yearly list composed by Pareene called the Hack 30: The Worst Pundits in America, a list of people described as "the most predictable, banal, intellectually dishonest and all-around hacky newspaper columnists, cable news shouting heads and political opinion-mongers working today." The Columbia Journalism Review described the list as a "fun-to-read, blunt, stick-it-in-deep-and-twist-it list of mostly old-world print-y pundits." The list became so popular in media circles that Pareene began composing essay-length posts throughout the year about each person featured in the list to expound upon what he considered to be their hackery.

=== Donald Trump ===
Pareene has been a frequent critic of Donald Trump, both before and after his election as President. At varying times Pareene has referred to Trump as a "fictional television clown tycoon", "a living freak show" and "a weird attention-hungry idiot."

On August 15, 2012, Trump criticized Pareene on Twitter as a "lightweight reporter" who is a "total joke in political circles". Over the previous week Trump had been alluding to a "very, very major" surprise for the 2012 Republican National Convention that would be "unique and interesting". Pareene had written that Trump's surprise "is almost definitely just going to be some idiotic video where Trump 'fires' [a Barack Obama] impersonator." One day later, Obama impersonator Kevin Michel posted on his Twitter feed a picture of himself with Trump and advised his followers to "watch the Republican National Convention", prompting some news outlets to conjecture that Trump was upset that Pareene had accurately predicted his surprise. When interviewed by Politico about Trump's criticism, Pareene responded, "I was hoping the first universally loathed NBC personality to publicly call me out would be the monkey from Animal Practice, but I'll settle for Trump."

== Books ==
- A Tea People's History, October 2, 2011, 49 pages, Salon Media Group, ASIN B005S4GS54
- The Rude Guide To Mitt, April 17, 2012, 51 pages, Salon Media Group, ASIN B007UPDEG0

== See also ==
- Ana Marie Cox
- Nick Denton
- Maureen O'Connor
