= Sam Biddle =

American technology journalist

- Born: Sam Faulkner Biddle; 1986 (age 39–40)
- Education: Johns Hopkins University
- Occupation: Journalist
- Employers: The Intercept; Gawker Media (formerly)
- Father: Wayne Biddle

Sam Faulkner Biddle (born 1986) is an American technology journalist. He is a reporter for The Intercept, and was formerly a senior writer at Gawker, the editor of the news website Valleywag, and a reporter at Gizmodo.

== Education ==
Biddle attended Johns Hopkins University, where he was a member of the Delta Phi fraternity and majored in philosophy.

== Career ==
Biddle was formerly the editor of Valleywag, a technology news website owned by Gawker Media. In October 2014, he announced that he was leaving Valleywag and taking a sabbatical, after which he took another reporting position at Gawker. In 2014, he was one of Vanity Fair's "News Disrupters".

Biddle has criticized and made fun of technology companies and affluent people in the San Francisco Bay Area. New York Magazine has referred to Biddle as "perhaps the most hated journalist in the Bay Area", while an article in PandoDaily attacked him as a "grotesque hypocrite".

Biddle played an important role in the online shaming of a woman in December 2013 after she had tweeted "Going to Africa. Hope I don't get AIDS. Just Kidding. I'm white!" to her 173 Twitter followers. Biddle posted her public tweet to Gawker, and the woman was later fired after considerable global media coverage of her tweet. In January 2014, Biddle said "It's satisfying to be able to say, 'O.K., let's make a racist tweet by a senior IAC employee count this time.' And it did. I'd do it again." The woman later defended herself, offering that she (a South African) had intended her tweet to "mimic—and mock—what an actual racist, ignorant person would say of South Africa." After the Bring Back Bullying incident, he posted a public apology.

Biddle experienced being a target of a similar online shaming incident in 2014 after tweeting "Bring Back Bullying", and "Ultimately #GamerGate is reaffirming what we've known to be true for decades: nerds should be constantly shamed and degraded into submission," during the Gamergate controversy. People tweeted at and emailed him, his supervisors, and Gawker advertisers to demand Biddle's firing and call for boycotts of advertisers. Gamergate supporters posted a list of Gawker's advertisers online, and contacted them in a campaign to force them to pull ad campaigns from Gawker websites. Adobe Systems then pulled its sponsorship in response.
