= Maggie Shnayerson =

American journalist and blogger

- Born: Margot Beahan Shnayerson; June 20, 1981 (age 45); New York City, U.S.
- Education: Brearley School; Holderness School; Dartmouth College
- Occupations: Journalist; blogger
- Relatives: Michael Shnayerson (brother)

Maggie Shnayerson (born Margot Beahan Shnayerson June 20, 1981 in New York, NY) is an American journalist and blogger. She was an editor at Gawker Media's flagship site, Gawker.com and has written for TIME magazine, the New York Sun, and the New York Post. Before joining Gawker, Shnayerson was the public relations director for the Village Voice and the New York Sun.

While at Gawker, Shnayerson's coverage of benefit cuts for freelancers working at media giant Viacom was credited by The Nation as having "helped instigate one of the most unlikely and successful labor campaigns of recent years." On February 25, 2008, Shnayerson was fired via email by Gawker Media publisher Nick Denton for failing to bring in enough page views under the company's new web traffic-based payment system. Several other Gawker editors left the site shortly before Shnayerson's departure, citing the new compensation scheme among their reasons for doing so.

== Personal life ==
Shnayerson is a graduate of Dartmouth College and attended the Brearley School and Holderness School. She's the daughter of the journalist and editor Robert Shnayerson, a former editor at TIME and of Harper's magazine. She is also the sister of Vanity Fair journalist Michael Shnayerson.
