= A. J. Daulerio =

American writer and blogger (born c. 1974)

- Born: Albert James Daulerio c. 1974 (age 51–52); Churchville, Pennsylvania, U.S.
- Education: La Salle University (BA)
- Occupations: Writer, editor, blogger
- Years active: 1996–2016; 2020–present
- Employer: Gawker Media (2005–2016)

Albert James Daulerio Jr. (born c. 1974) is an American writer and blogger. He is the former editor of Gawker and Deadspin. Daulerio published an excerpt of Hulk Hogan's sex tape, which led to a lawsuit and the bankruptcy and sale of Gawker Media.

== Early life and education ==
Daulerio was born and raised in Churchville, Pennsylvania. His father, Albert Sr., worked as a manager at Ford Motor Company and his mother worked as a secretary. He earned a Bachelor of Arts degree in communication and English from La Salle University in 1996, and began writing for Philadelphia magazine.

== Career ==
Daulerio moved to New York City in 1999 and took on multiple writing jobs including at Law.com, and The Bond Buyer. In January 2003, he was a founding editor of the website The Black Table, with Will Leitch, Eric Gillin and Aileen Gallagher. He joined Gawker Media in 2005 as the editor of Oddjack, a gambling blog, which lasted six months.

Daulerio became the editor of the sports blog Deadspin in July 2008. His highest-profile story involved then-New York Jets quarterback Brett Favre allegedly sending explicit photos of himself to Jenn Sterger. According to Esquire, after failing to get Sterger to go on the record, Daulerio decided to break the Favre scandal with his alleged texts that involved sexually explicit pictures and voicemails. In December 2011, he replaced Remy Stern as editor-in-chief at Gawker.

=== Hulk Hogan sex tape ===
On October 4, 2012, Daulerio posted a short clip of Hulk Hogan and Heather Clem, the estranged wife of Todd Alan Clem, having sex. Hogan sent Gawker a cease-and-desist order to take the video down, but site founder Nick Denton refused. Denton cited the First Amendment and argued the accompanying commentary had news value. Judge Pamela Campbell issued an injunction ordering Gawker to take down the clip. In April 2013, Gawker wrote, "A judge told us to take down our Hulk Hogan sex tape post. We won't."

Hogan successfully sued Gawker and Daulerio for $140 million. During the trial, the jury was shown a taped deposition where Daulerio said that he would only consider a celebrity sex tape non-newsworthy if the subject was a child under the age of four. He later told the court he was being flippant in his response.

=== The Small Bow ===
In 2020, Daulerio founded the Small Bow, a website and newsletter primarily dedicated to articles about drug and alcohol addiction, philosophy and stories for those in recovery.
