= Nicholas Carlson =

Editor-in-chief of Insider

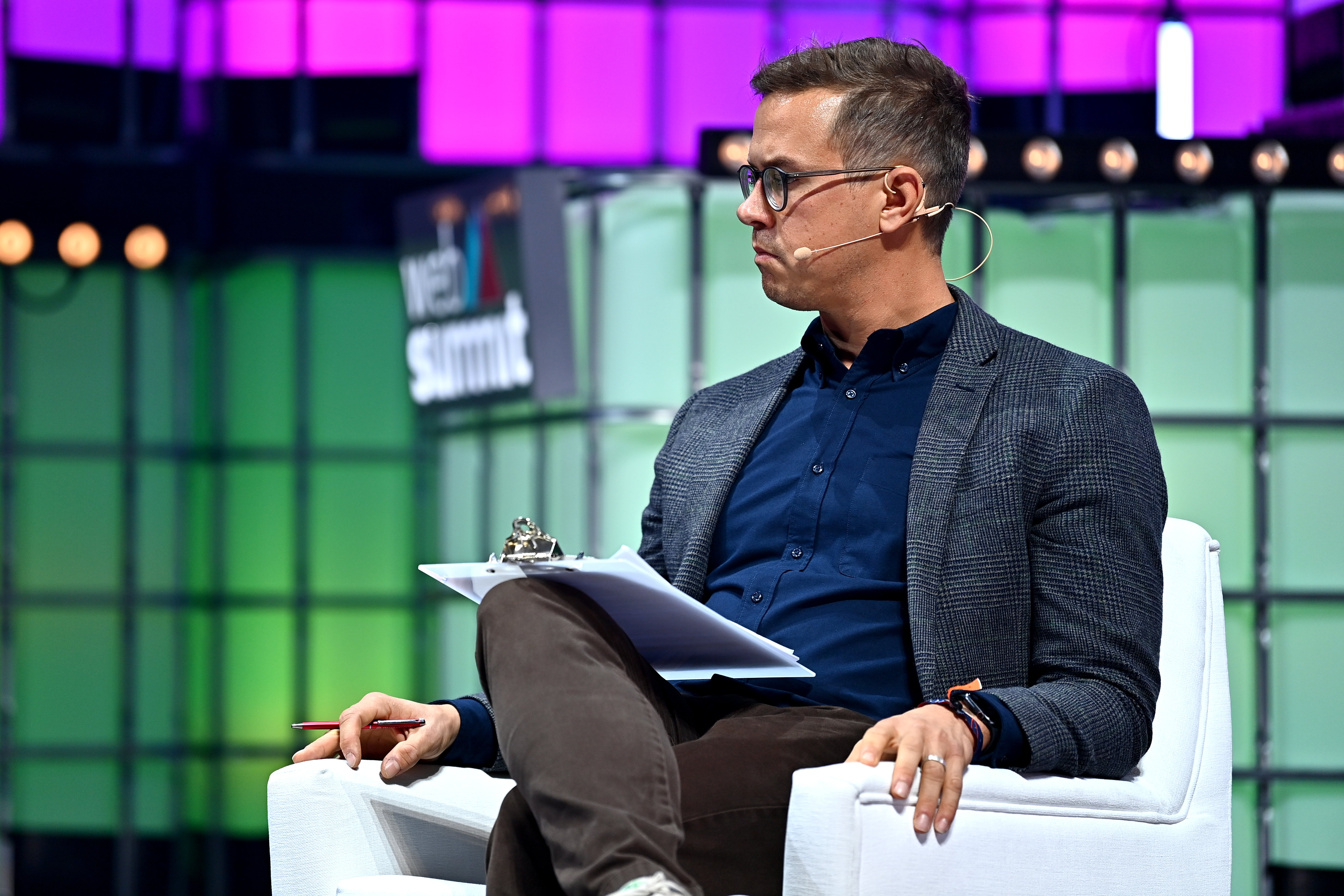
- Carlson in 2021
- Education: Davidson College
- Occupation: Journalist

Nicholas Carlson is the CEO of Dynamo, and co-host of "Business Explains The World." Before that, he was the global editor-in-chief of Business Insider. Before that, he was Business Insider's chief correspondent.

Carlson attended Davidson College, graduating in 2005. He began his career at Merrill Lynch before joining InternetNews.com and the Silicon Valley news blog Valleywag. In 2015, Carlson published the biography Marissa Mayer and the Fight to Save Yahoo!. He won a Longform award for best business coverage for his reporting on AOL CEO Tim Armstrong's controversial investment in the local news initiative Patch.

In 2022, Gawker reported that Carlson earned an annual salary of $600,000 as Insider editor-in-chief.

Carlson was observed on June 13, 2023 taking pro-union posters with his face on them off lampposts in Windsor Terrace, Brooklyn during a labor strike at Insider by its journalists.
