= Joel Johnson (journalist) =

American journalist

- Born: Kansas City, United States
- Presenting career
- Show: The Gadget Testers
- Network: BBC America
- Country: United States

Joel Johnson is a journalist and media personality, the founding editor of The Consumerist. He is a contributing editor at The Wirecutter, and a former editor of Boing Boing, Wired, former editorial director at Gawker Media, and Animal NY. In 2013, he co-hosted The Gadget Testers on BBC America. As editor of Gizmodo, Johnson won the 2005 Bloggie Award for Best Technology Website.
