= Will Leitch =

American writer and the founding editor of the Gawker Media former sports blog Deadspin

- Born: William F. Leitch; Mattoon, Illinois, U.S.
- Education: University of Illinois at Urbana–Champaign
- Writing career
- Notable works: The Black Table, Deadspin
- Website: www.griersonleitch.com

William F. Leitch is an American writer and the founding editor of the Gawker Media sports blog Deadspin. Leitch is a national correspondent for MLB.com, a contributing editor at New York, film critic at Grierson & Leitch, contributor to The New York Times, GQ, The Washington Post, and NBC News.

Leitch is the author of six published books. His fifth book, How Lucky,(2021) won an Alex Award in 2022, was nominated for an Edgar Award, and received an endorsement from author Stephen King. His seventh book, Lloyd McNeil's Last Ride, was published by Harper in May 2025 and is set to be adapted into a movie with Leith serving as executive producer following a competitive bidding war with Lionsgate Films winning out.

== Background ==
Leitch was born and raised in Mattoon, Illinois, which is also the setting of Catch. He attended the University of Illinois at Urbana–Champaign. He was an editor at the university's paper, the Daily Illini. He now lives in Athens, Georgia.

One of Leitch's first brushes with fame came when he appeared on an early episode of Win Ben Stein's Money. In his memoir, Life as a Loser, Leitch describes the experience of taping the episode within hours of being dumped by his fiancée, a fact that co-host Jimmy Kimmel included in Leitch's introduction.

== Career ==
=== IronMinds.com ===
Leitch was the managing editor of Ironminds, an online magazine that existed from 1999-2002. He also wrote a column for the magazine, "Life as a Loser".

=== The Black Table ===
In January 2003, Leitch became a founding editor of the website The Black Table, with Eric Gillin, A.J. Daulerio, and Aileen Gallagher. His Life As A Loser column ran online for five years and was ultimately compiled into a book of the same title, with a foreword written by Tom Perrotta.

=== Deadspin ===
In September 2005, Leitch became the founding editor of Deadspin, which quickly became one of the most popular independent sports blogs and was profiled in Sports Illustrated and The New York Times. Leitch announced on June 5, 2008, that he would leave Deadspin at the end of the month to become a contributing editor at New York magazine. Deadspin would later shut down after all its writers left following a dispute management. Most of the writers later created Defector Media.

=== Other work ===
During the 2007 NCAA Tournament, Leitch wrote a daily column for TimesSelect, the paid section of The New York Times. During the 2007 baseball playoffs, Leitch wrote a daily column for The New York Times web site.

Leitch hosted The Will Leitch Show for Sports Illustrated for two seasons. Guests included Guy Pearce, Lea Thompson, Dale Earnhardt Jr., Stephanie Beatriz, Andre Holland, Heidi Gardner and Sean Astin.

Leitch also cohosts Waitin' Since Last Saturday, a podcast about University of Georgia football. He also cohosts the movie review podcast Grierson & Leitch with his lifelong friend and film critic Tim Grierson. The duo also write features for the entertainment website Vulture. Leitch also cohosts the St. Louis Cardinals podcast Seeing Red with Bernie Miklasz.

== Bibliography ==
- Life as a Loser. Arriviste Press, Inc. 2004. ISBN 0-9746270-0-3.. A novel.
- Catch. Razorbill. 2005. ISBN 978-1-59514-069-2. A memoir.
- God Save the Fan. HarperCollins. 2008. ISBN 978-0-06-135178-5. A book of sports essays.
- Are We Winning?. Hyperion. 2010. ISBN 978-1-4013-2370-7. A book about fatherhood and baseball.
- How Lucky. Harper Books. 2021. ISBN 978-0-06-307309-8.
- Lloyd McNeil's Last Ride. Harper Books. 2025. ISBN 978-0-06-323856-5.
