= Owen Thomas (writer) =

American tech and business journalist

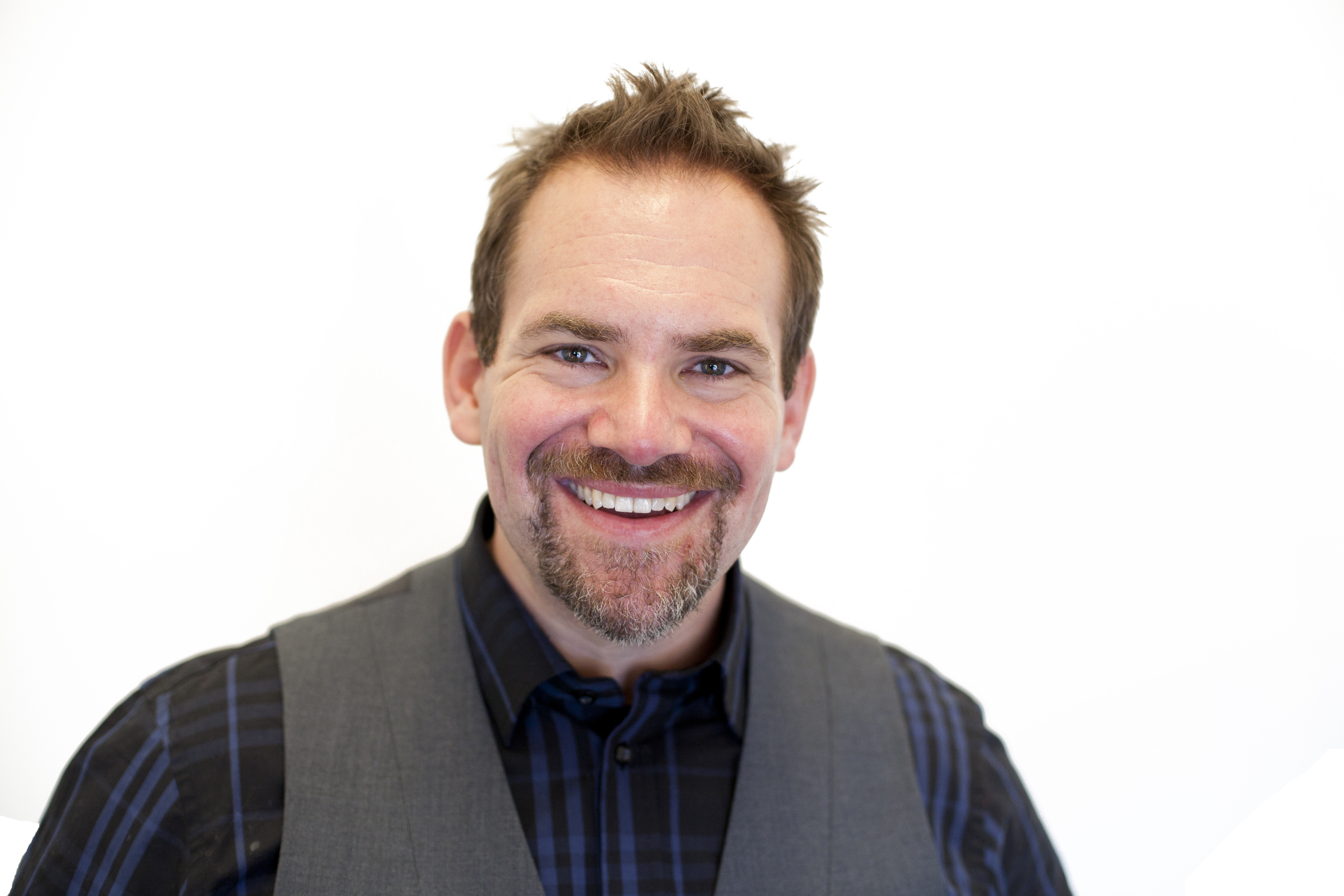
- Photo of Owen Thomas by Mark Andrew Boyer
- Born: March 30, 1972 (age 54)
- Occupations: Blogger, journalist, entrepreneur

Owen Thomas (born March 30, 1972) is an American blogger, journalist, and entrepreneur who serves as managing editor of the San Francisco Business Times.

He was the founding executive editor of The Daily Dot and former executive editor of VentureBeat. He was the managing editor of Valleywag, a Gawker Media gossip and news blog about Silicon Valley personalities that billed itself as a "tech gossip rag".

== Career ==
Thomas graduated from Thomas Jefferson High School for Science and Technology. He is a 1994 graduate of the University of Chicago. He first worked at Suck.com, and later at the former technology magazine Business 2.0.

He was managing editor of the Silicon Valley gossip website Valleywag, before leaving to run NBC's local site for the San Francisco Bay Area.

Thomas does some on-screen commentary in the film Revenge of the Electric Car.

In 2013, Thomas was named editor-in-chief of ReadWrite. He joined the San Francisco Chronicle as business editor in 2016, leaving in 2021 to become a senior editor at the tech news site Protocol.

== Valleywag ==
Thomas replaced Nick Denton as the managing editor of Valleywag on July 6, 2007. Valleywag, a two-man operation, was written mostly by Thomas, with help from its former editor, Nick Douglas.

In 2007, Thomas outed Peter Thiel as gay in Valleywag while Thiel was in Saudi Arabia on business. In response, Thiel covertly funded lawsuits by third parties against Gawker Media, Valleywag's parent. Thiel's role came to light in the aftermath of the Bollea v. Gawker verdict, which awarded Bollea, known professionally as Hulk Hogan, $140 million after Gawker published a sex tape of him. Thomas contends that Thiel's sexuality was already "known to a wide circle", so his coverage did not constitute an outing.
