= Maureen O'Connor =

Maureen O'Connor may refer to:

- Maureen O'Connor (judge), American lawyer, judge and politician in Ohio
- Maureen O'Connor (California politician)
- Maureen O'Connor (journalist)

== See also ==
- Maureen Connor, American artist
