= Consumerist =

Non-profit consumer affairs website

- Homepage on 31 December 2008; References to Gawker Media properties have since been removed.
- Website type: Non-profit consumer news
- Available in: English
- Dissolved: October 30, 2017; 8 years ago
- Owner: Consumer Reports
- Creators: Nick Denton; Joel Johnson
- Editors: Ben Popken; Meg Marco
- Website: consumerist.com
- Registration: Optional
- Launched: 2005; 21 years ago
- Current status: Closed

Consumerist (also known as The Consumerist) was a non-profit consumer affairs website owned by Consumer Media LLC, a subsidiary of Consumer Reports, with content created by a team of full-time reporters and editors. The site's focus was on consumerism and consumers' experiences and issues with companies and corporations, concentrating mostly on U.S. consumers. As an early proponent of crowdsourced journalism, some content was based on reader-submitted tips and complaints. The majority of the site's articles consisted of original content and reporting by the site's staff. On October 30, 2017, Consumer Reports shut down Consumerist, stating that coverage of consumer issues would now be found on the main Consumer Reports website.

== History ==
Gawker Media established the site in December 2005, with Joel Johnson as editor.

In creating Consumerist, Denton established its slogan and initial focus on readers' complaints, "consumer-oriented news nuggets, funny pictures and shopping tips — all with the same snarky tone that characterizes Gawker properties like Wonkette and Defamer." Gawker hired Ben Popken to take over as site lead in February, 2006. Johnson left Gawker in July 2006, citing a "disagreement about [his] role within the company."

Gawker put the site up for sale in November 2008, at the same time it announced the closure of one of its other blogs, Valleywag. Consumerist was purchased by Consumers Union, the publishers of Consumer Reports, in December 2008. The site's two editors, site lead Ben Popken and senior editor Meghann Marco, were retained through the sale. Following the acquisition, Marco and Popken shared the title of Co-Executive Editor, and contributors Chris Walters and Carey Greenberg-Berger, who had been laid off by Gawker, were reinstated.

Due to potential conflict of interest concerns, Consumerist did not run display ads for outside advertisers; while owned by Gawker, all display ads linked to other Gawker sites, although the Consumerist sold text ads through the Google AdWords program. As such, the site was considered a loss leader, whose primary business role was to help drive traffic to other revenue-producing Gawker sites. As an ad-free publication, Consumerist "[had] some freedom" to take on major national advertisers such as Comcast.

Consumer Reports laid off Managing Editor Ben Popken in November 2011. The departure was announced in a final blog post by Popken on Consumerist. Other editors later joined the site, including Deputy Editor Chris Morran, Senior Editor Mary Beth Quirk, Assistant Editor Laura Northrup, Content Editor Kate Cox, and Special Projects Editor Ashlee Kieler.

Consumerist's traffic remained steady throughout most of its existence. At the time it was acquired from Gawker, it had monthly traffic of approximately 10 million pageviews, and had similar levels as of 2014.

On August 30, 2017, The Wall Street Journal announced that it had appointed Meg Marco as its Editor, Digital Content Strategy, citing her history at Consumerist, which it called "the innovative digital arm of Consumer Reports."

On October 30, 2017, it was announced that no further posts to Consumerist.com would be made.

== Features ==
"Friday Flickr Finds"

Usually the first post of every Friday consisting of reader submitted photos.

"Great Moments In Commercial History"

A popular past feature was known as "Great Moments In Commercial History", which focused on strange and entertaining local commercials. Past feature "moments" have included Moo and Oink grocery stores (Chicago, Illinois) and Mr. Appliance (Eugene, Oregon).

"Christmas Creep"

This feature publicized photos or stories of retail stores advertising Christmas sales, displaying Christmas decorations, or playing Christmas music far before the traditional holiday season, and often appeared between September and early November.

"Above and Beyond"

In a post introducing "Above and Beyond", Creator Carey Greenberg-Berger said: "Occasionally, corporations do something right. Not all the time. Not most of the time. Occasionally. When they do, we want to give credit where credit is due."

"Worst Company In America"

Consumerist ran an annual "Worst Company In America" contest with the winner determined by a series of reader polls. The single-elimination tournament was similar in format to college basketball's March Madness being held simultaneously. Companies that have advanced to the final four are included in the table below. The winning company was sent a "Golden Poo" trophy. In recent years, silver and bronze poos have been sent to the other finalists. This tournament was last held in 2014.

Year	Winner	Runner-up	Third place
2006	Halliburton	Choicepoint	Wal-Mart and US Government
2007	RIAA	Halliburton	Wal-Mart and Exxon
2008	Countrywide Financial (Note: One of the first dominoes to fall in the United States housing bubble)	Comcast	Diebold and Wal-Mart
2009	AIG (Note: Involved in 2009 AIG bonus payments controversy after taking billions of dollars in Troubled Asset Relief Program bailouts)	Comcast	Bank of America (Note: Acquired Countrywide Financial in 2008) and Ticketmaster
2010	Comcast	Cash4Gold	Bank of America and Ticketmaster
2011	BP (Note: involved in the 2010 Deepwater Horizon oil spill)	Bank of America	Comcast and Ticketmaster
2012	Electronic Arts	Bank of America	AT&T (Note: Defeated Wal-Mart in the first consolation match to win the bronze poo.) and Wal-Mart
2013	Electronic Arts	Bank of America	Comcast
2014	Comcast	Monsanto	Wal-Mart and SeaWorld

^{
}

== Highlights ==
Stories reported on Consumerist have been featured in national media such as CNN and The New York Times. Consumerist often posts phone numbers and contact information for CEOs and upper level corporate customer support, and provides information on how to execute an "Executive Email Carpet Bomb".

=== Vincent Ferrari and AOL ===
On June 13, 2006, Vincent Ferrari posted an audio file of himself speaking with an AOL representative, allegedly named John, as Ferrari tried to cancel his AOL account. The AOL representative initially resisted Ferrari's request by attempting to keep the discussion focused on Ferrari's reasons for wanting to cancel. Vincent asked the customer representative several times to close the account until the conversation became confrontational, at which point Ferrari adamantly stated, "Cancel the account!", repeatedly until John complied with his request. After recording this call, Ferrari both posted it to his blog and submitted it to Consumerist tip line. The AOL representative whom Vincent spoke to was fired from his job. Consumerist called the story "[t]he best story we ever posted."

=== "The Grocery Shrink Ray" ===
The "grocery shrink ray" is a term Meghann Marco coined to describe the trend for groceries to be reduced in size while being sold at the same price point. Manufacturers perform these reductions to reduce their own costs but do not pass any savings on to the customer. Installments of these articles usually included user submitted photographs of the product in question on the shelf, being sold along with a newer and slightly smaller version of the same product. Local and national media outlets such as WTVT-TV FOX 13 in Florida, and National Public Radio has interviewed Popken regarding the trend and his attempts to inform the public at large. The issue is now commonly known as shrinkflation.

=== Facebook terms of service ===
On February 15, 2009, Consumerist broke the news of a terms of service clause that gave Facebook the right to "Do anything they want with your content. Forever." Mark Zuckerberg, CEO of Facebook, Inc., later claimed that a paragraph was accidentally left out saying that the license to your content was exclusive to one's privacy settings and that the license expired when an account was closed. This event instigated much media coverage over the controversy of the terms of service.

== Closure ==
On October 30, 2017, Consumerist announced it was shutting down, and that coverage would be handled by Consumer Reports in the future.
