= Insider Inc. =

American online media company

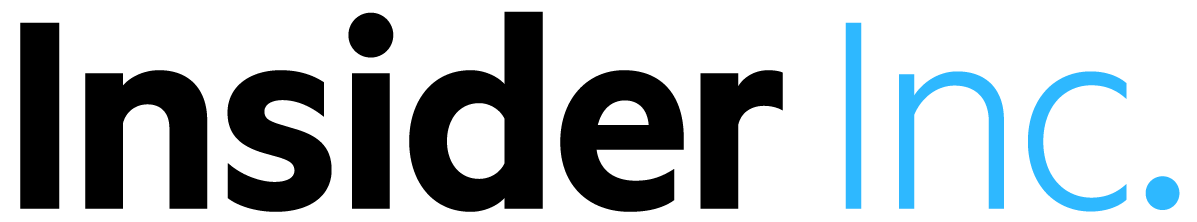

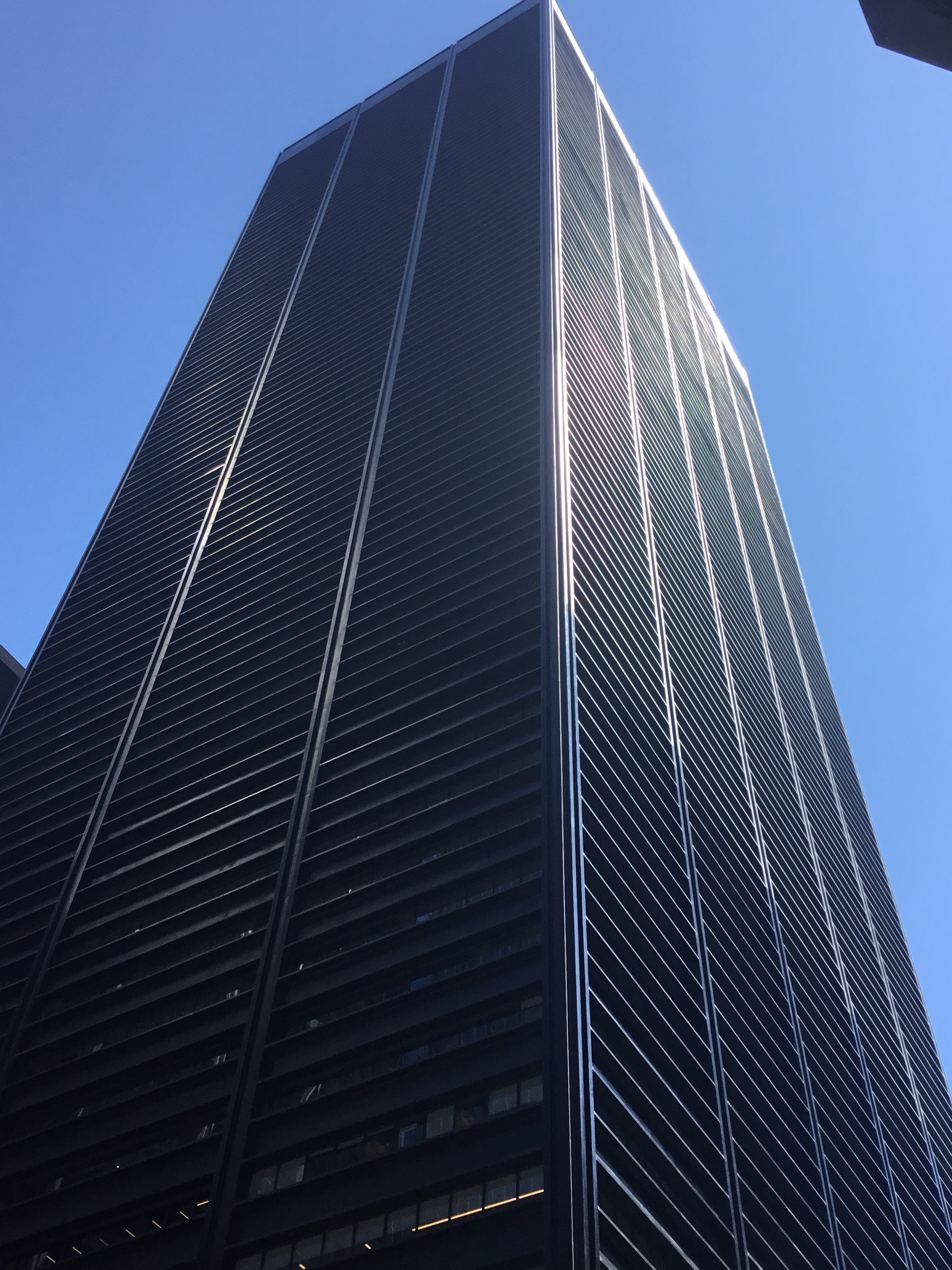
- Insider Inc. headquarters at One Liberty Plaza in Lower Manhattan, New York City
- Formerly: Business Insider Inc. (2007–2017)
- Type: Subsidiary
- Industry: Online media
- Founded: 2007; 19 years ago
- Founders: Henry Blodget; Kevin P. Ryan
- Headquarters: One Liberty Plaza, New York City, New York, U.S.
- Key people: Barbara Peng (CEO); Nicholas Carlson (editor-in-chief)
- Number of employees: 551 (2019)
- Parent: Axel Springer SE
- Website: www.insider-inc.com

Insider Inc. (formerly Business Insider Inc.) is an American online media company known for publishing Business Insider and other media websites. It is a subsidiary of the German publisher Axel Springer SE, the largest in Europe.

== History ==
Business Insider was founded in 2007 by Henry Blodget and Kevin P. Ryan. In 2013, Jeff Bezos led an effort to raise US$5 million for Business Insider Inc. through his investment company Bezos Expeditions. On September 29, 2015, Axel Springer SE announced that it had acquired 88% of the stake in Business Insider Inc. for a reported US$343 million (€306 million). After the purchase, Axel Springer SE held a stake of approximately 97%, and Jeff Bezos held the remaining shares through Bezos Expeditions.

Business Insider Inc.'s name was changed to Insider Inc. in December 2017 as the company planned on becoming a general interest news publisher. Nicholas Carlson is Global Editor-in-Chief of Insider. In January 2018, the firm moved its global headquarters in New York City from the Flatiron District to the Financial District. In March 2018, it launched its first advertising campaign, with the tagline "Get in." The firm started using the Digital Content Ratings of Nielsen Holdings to measure its digital video audience in July 2018.

== Websites ==
=== Business Insider and Tech Insider ===
Business Insider is the original publication of Insider Inc., focusing on business and financial news. The website Tech Insider originally started as a standalone technology-focused news website in 2015, but it was eventually incorporated into a section of Business Insider.

=== Insider ===
Insider.com
- Website type: Financial news website
- Available in: English
- Website: insider.com
- Commercial: Yes
- Current status: Active

In 2015, Business Insider started establishing a social media presence on Twitter and Facebook for Insider, its general news site comparable to BuzzFeed. The website Insider.com launched in May 2016 and focuses on news and lifestyle articles and video.

=== Markets Insider ===
In October 2016, Business Insider started Markets Insider, a globally-focused markets data and news service. Data is provided by Germany-based finance portal Finanzen.net, another Axel Springer holding.

=== Insider Reviews ===
In 2015, the company launched Insider Picks, the precursor to what is now Insider Reviews, to help shoppers navigate the complex retail industry and make the best purchasing decisions.
