= Holderness School =

Prep school in Holderness, New Hampshire, US

Coordinates: 43°45′32″N 71°40′28″W

The Holderness School
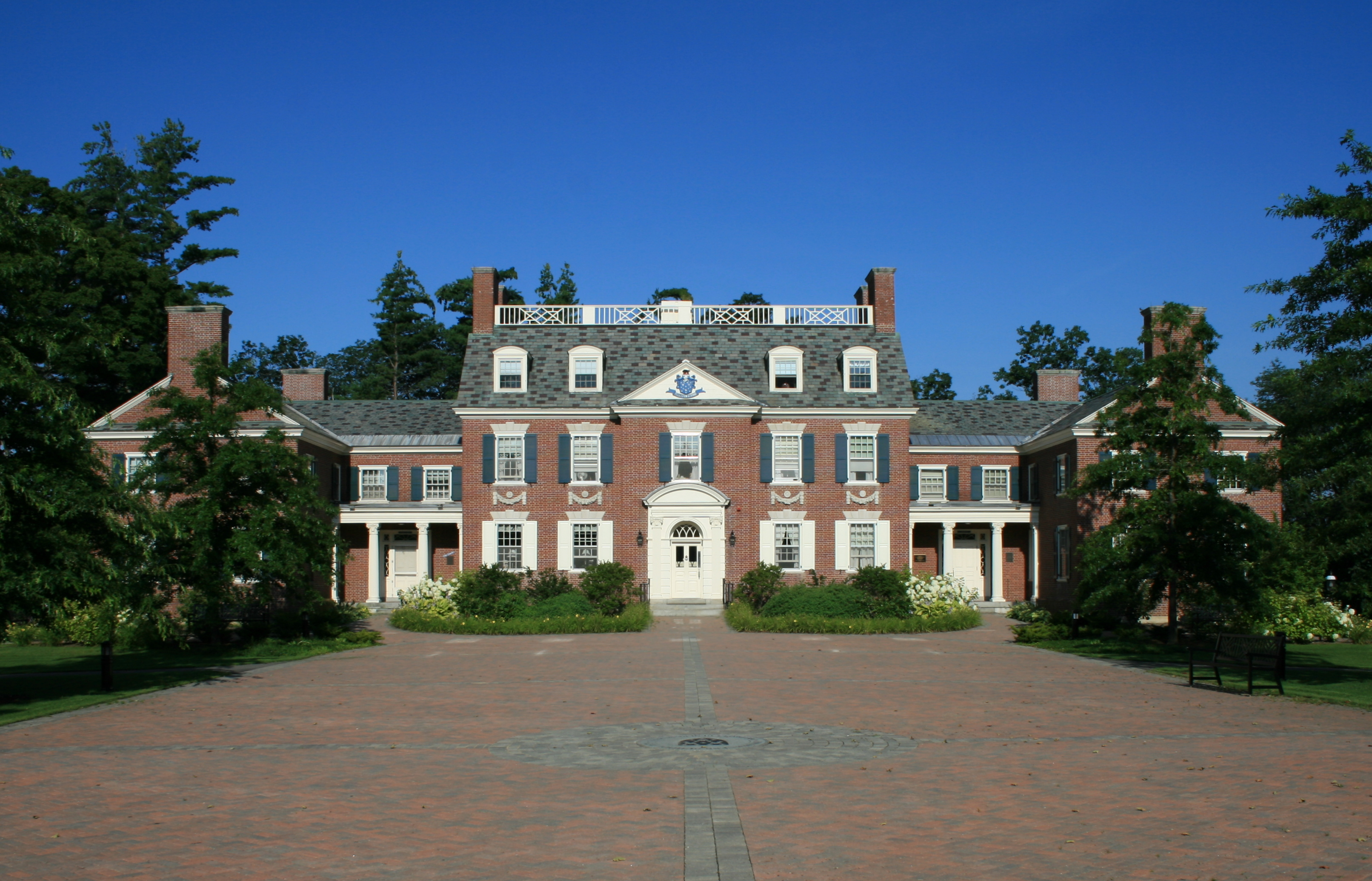
- Holderness, New Hampshire; USA

Information
- Type: Private high school
- Motto: Latin: Pro Deo et Genere Humano
- Religious affiliation: Episcopal
- Established: 1879
- Head of School: John McVeigh
- Grades: 9-12, PG
- Enrollment: 301 (2021)
- Campus: Rural
- Color: Blue
- Mascot: Blue Bull
- Website: www.holderness.org

The Holderness School is a private, coeducational college-preparatory school in Holderness, near Plymouth, New Hampshire in the United States. The student body of 300 is drawn from 22 U.S. states and 14 foreign countries. While Holderness operates primarily as a boarding school, it also enrolls 25 day students. John McVeigh is currently Holderness School's 10th Head of School (headmaster). McVeigh's predecessor was R. Phillip Peck, M.Ed. In the summer the campus is used as a site for various Gordon Research Conferences.

== History ==
The town of Holderness had a unique background historically. Granted in 1765 to John Wentworth, and 67 other Episcopalians, Holderness was "a company of English immigrants ardently devoted to the creed and worship of the Church of England, and with glowing anticipation for the future of the colony".

Founded in 1879, still under the auspices of the Episcopal Diocese of New Hampshire, the school retains some links with the denomination, but now conducts ecumenical chapel services and welcomes applicants of all faiths.

The school has an exceptional sports program. Competitive with the highest rated college preparatory schools, a few of the school's headmasters had attended boarding schools, and Ivy League colleges. Don Hagerman, who was appointed in 1951, had been on the faculty of Deerfield Academy, and served as a headmaster at Tabor Academy, now a highly rated boarding school in Marion, Massachusetts. Hagerman graduated from Dartmouth College in 1935.

As a private institution, the contemporary school has attempted to maintain small class sizes, offer a broad variety of subjects and give students the opportunity to experience New Hampshire’s lakes and mountains.

== Location ==
The school is on high ground on the east side of the Pemigewasset River in Holderness overlooking the town of Plymouth, population about 6,000, and home of Plymouth State University and Speare Memorial Hospital. Holderness is about 110 miles (180 km) north of Boston. Access to Interstate 93 is within sight of the campus.

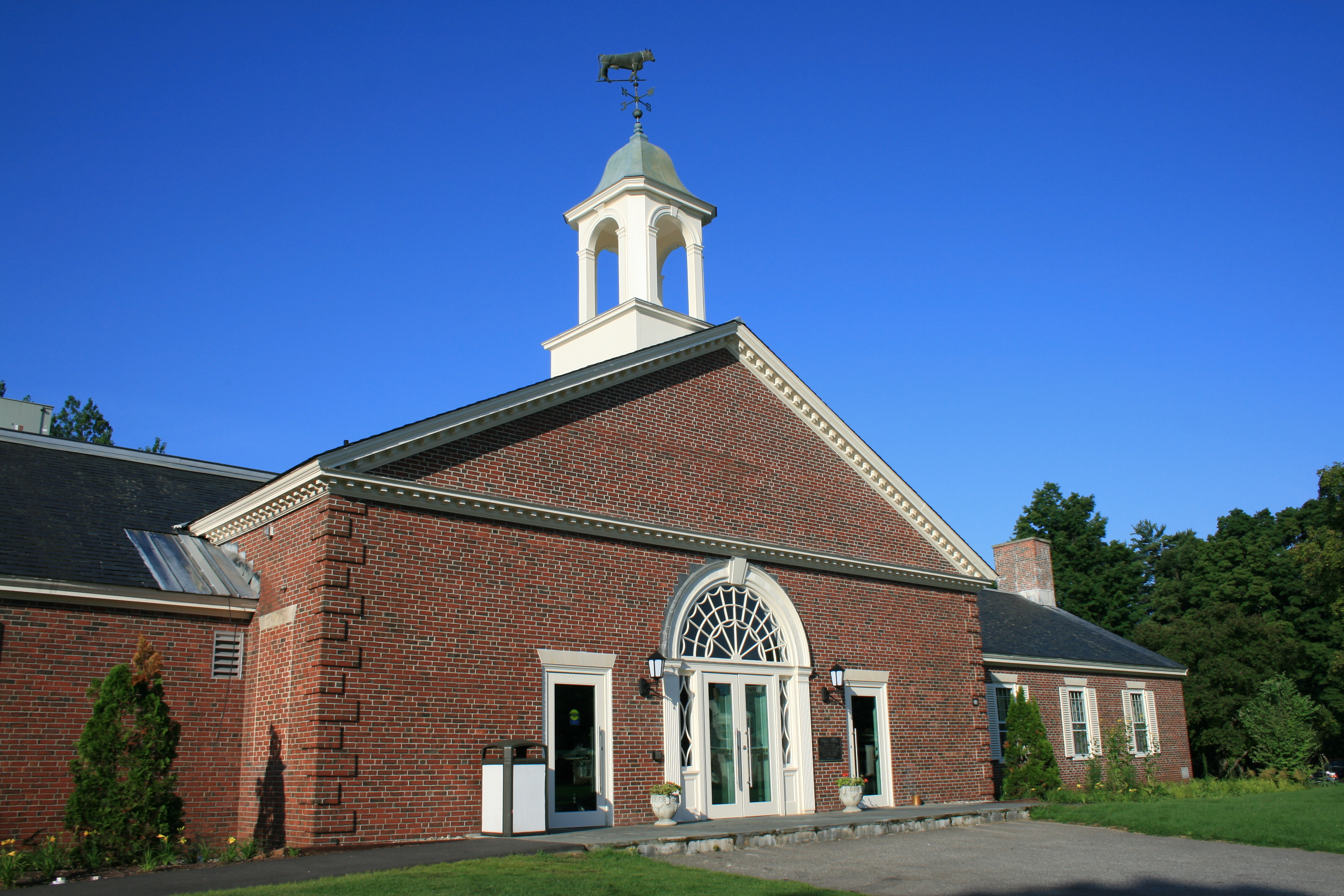
Weld Dining Hall

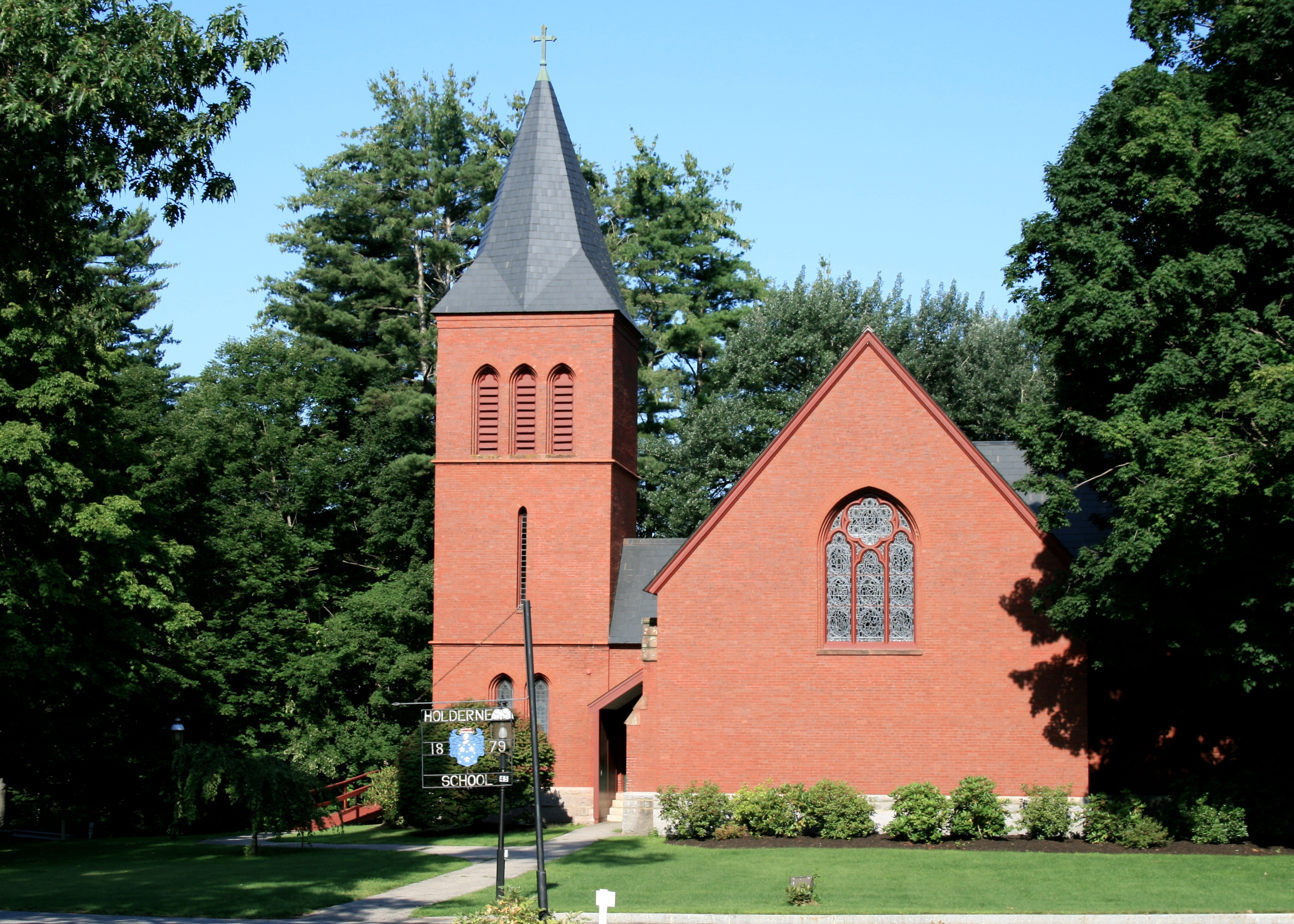
Holderness School Chapel

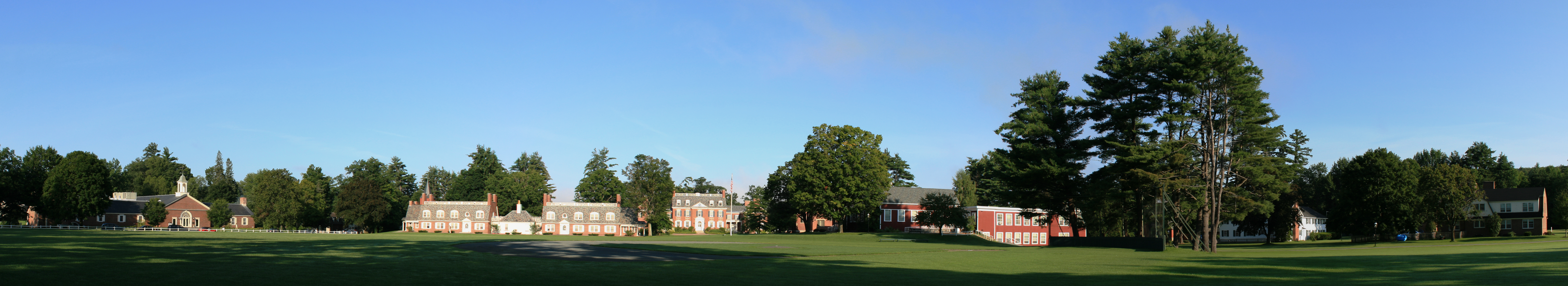
Holderness School campus

== Facilities ==
Holderness School's 600 acres (2.4 km^{2}) of land contains academic buildings, an outdoor covered ice rink, eight playing fields, 10 tennis courts, and 10 kilometers of cross-country trails. In the past few years, the school has built a new library and health center, a dining hall, two residential facilities, and a Math and Science center. The school has plans for greater improvements to the rink, an updated Athletics Center, and a student life facility centering on the school's historic chapel.

== Special programs ==
The freshman class participates in Project Outreach, a community service project. Artward Bound offers sophomores a 10-day program of intensive study with professional artists in disciplines such as glass-blowing, blacksmithing, African dance, and stand-up comedy. The "Out Back" program is a cornerstone of life at Holderness. In Out Back, juniors trek in the woods for 11 days in a winter expedition all while, keeping a personal journal, learning and living together and experiencing a three days solo. Seniors complete a Senior Thesis which is a year-long experiential learning project culminating in a presentation and project.

== Notable alumni ==
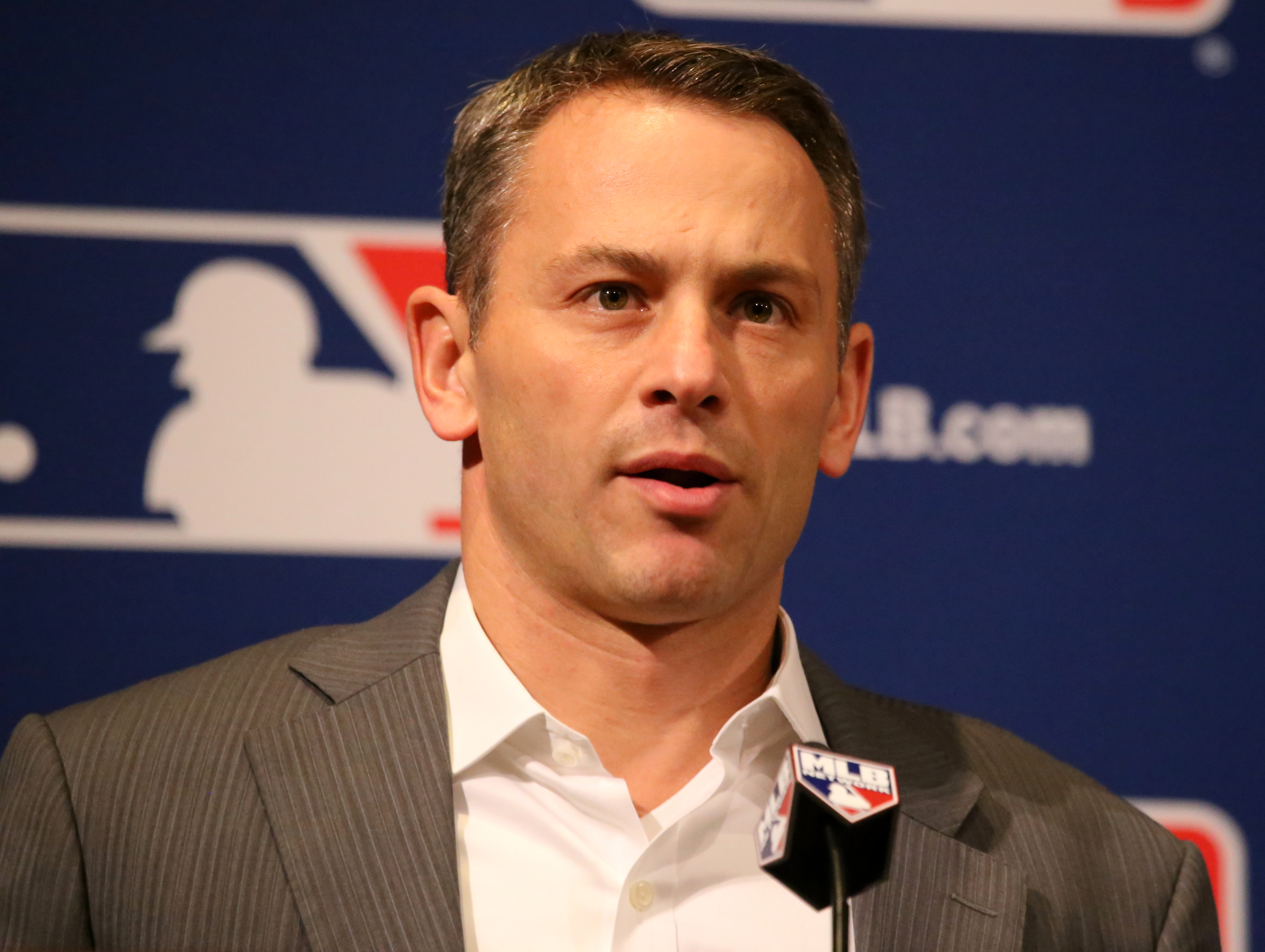
Jed Hoyer

- William Drea Adams, Chairman of the National Endowment of the Humanities
- Gerry Ashworth, 1964 Olympic Gold medalist in 4x100m track, Harvard Business School graduate, and company executive, was President of General Metals and Smelting
- Charles Bass, New Hampshire congressman
- Olin Browne, pro golfer
- Kyle Carey, Celtic American musician
- Robert Creeley, poet
- Chris Davenport, ski mountaineer and film star
- Angel Del Villar II, the rapper Homeboy Sandman
- Nat Faxon, screenwriter, actor and comedian
- Jeremy Foley, University of Florida athletic director
- Julia Ford, member of the 2014 U.S. Alpine Ski Team
- Tyler Hamilton, professional racing cyclist
- Brette Harrington, alpinist
- Jed Hoyer, General Manager of the Chicago Cubs
- Nikki Kimball, ultramarathoner
- Glenn D. Lowry, Director, Museum of Modern Art
- Brett Lunger, race car driver
- Montgomery Meigs, retired United States Army general
- Terence Mitchell, British museum curator
- Tyler Palmer, Olympic skier
- Martynas Pocius, professional basketball player
- Gavin Bayreuther, professional hockey player
- Freddy Hall, professional soccer player
- Gabriel Sherman, journalist and author
- Maggie Shnayerson, journalist and blogger
- Joey Mormina, professional hockey player
