= Geoffrey R. Denton =

British economist

Geoffrey R. Denton (born 1931) is a British economist. He served as Director of Wilton Park, and formerly as Reader in Economics at the University of Reading (from 1967) and Professor and head of economics at the College of Europe in Bruges. He was also Research Director of the Federal Trust for Education and Research from 1973 and Special Adviser to the House of Lords European Communities Committee. He was married to a Hungarian refugee who was a student of his in the 1960s. They were the parents of Nick Denton.

He worked for the Political and Economic Planning think tank 1955-1959 and was a member of its Executive Committee 1967-1973.

Upon his resignation from the College of Europe, he was made an honorary member of the student association.

== Works ==
- Devolution or federalism?: options for a United Kingdom, with Sir Bernard Burrows, 1980
- Federal solutions to European issues, with Sir Bernard Burrows and Geoffrey Edwards, 1978
- Trade effects of public subsidies to private enterprise, with Seamus O'Cleireacain and Sally Ash, 1975
- Economic and monetary union in Europe, 1974
- Subsidy issues in international commerce, with Seamus O'Cleireacain, 1972
- A new economic mechanism?: economic reform in Hungary, 1971
- Economic reform in Yugoslavia: I. Plans and markets in Yugoslavia, with Thomas Wilson, 1968
- Economic planning and policies in Britain, France and Germany, with Murray Greensmith Forsyth and Malcolm Cameron MacLennan, 1968
