= Maureen O'Connor (journalist) =

American journalist and blogger

Maureen O'Connor (born c. 1984) is an American journalist.

O'Connor first began blogging for IvyGate while a student at Princeton University, following stories such as the Yale student abortion art controversy in 2008. She moved to Gawker in November 2009. Among scoops she has been credited with breaking was a story about U.S. Congressman Chris Lee's solicitations for sexual partners via Craigslist in February 2011, quickly leading to Lee's resignation.

In May 2012, O'Connor was named features editor at New York magazine's The Cut. She started writing New York magazine's Sex Lives column in 2014, and launched New York magazine's Sex Lives podcast in 2015. She became a contributing editor at Vanity Fair in 2019.
