= Gawker =

Defunct blog on celebrities and media

- Website type: Blog
- Founded: 2002 (original); 2021 (relaunch)
- Dissolved: August 22, 2016; 10 years ago (original); February 1, 2023; 3 years ago (after 2021 relaunch)
- Headquarters: New York City
- Owners: Gawker Media (2002–2016); Bustle Digital Group (2018–2023); Meng Ru Kuok (2023–present)
- Founders: Nick Denton; Elizabeth Spiers
- Editor: Leah Finnegan
- Website: gawker.com
- Commercial: Yes
- Launched: 2002; 24 years ago (original); July 28, 2021; 5 years ago (relaunch)
- Current status: Shut down

Gawker was an American blog founded by Nick Denton and Elizabeth Spiers that was based in New York City and focused on celebrities and the media industry. According to SimilarWeb, the site had over 23 million visits per month in 2015. Founded in 2002, Gawker was the flagship blog for Denton's Gawker Media. Gawker Media also managed other blogs such as Jezebel, io9, Deadspin, and Kotaku.

Gawker had come under scrutiny for posting videos, communications and other content that violated copyrights or the privacy of its owners, or was illegally obtained. Gawker's publication of a sex tape featuring Hulk Hogan led Hogan to sue the company for invasion of privacy. Hogan received financial support from billionaire investor Peter Thiel, who had been outed as gay by Gawker against his wishes. On June 10, 2016, Gawker filed for bankruptcy after being ordered to pay Hogan $140 million in damages. On August 18, 2016, Gawker Media announced that its namesake blog would be ceasing operations the following week. Its other websites were unaffected, and continued publication under Univision as the renamed Gizmodo Media Group. Founder Nick Denton created the site's final post on August 22, 2016. The Freedom of the Press Foundation independently archived the Gawker website and its articles in 2018.

On July 12, 2018, Bryan Goldberg, owner of Bustle and Elite Daily, purchased Gawker.com and its archive in a bankruptcy auction for less than $1.5 million. Gawker relaunched under the Bustle Digital Group on July 28, 2021, with Leah Finnegan as editor. On February 1, 2023, Bustle Digital Group suspended the site's operations. Finnegan tweeted that the publication was folding.

In November 2023, Gawker was acquired by Meng Ru Kuok. The Gawker digital archive was not included in this purchase, with all articles wiped from the original website and relocated to gawkerarchives.com.

== History ==
=== The original Gawker (2002–2016) ===
The Gawker Media newsroom at 210 Elizabeth Street in New York on July 13, 2010

Gawker was founded by journalist Nick Denton in 2002, after he left the Financial Times. It was originally edited by Elizabeth Spiers. Gawker's official launch was in December 2002. When Spiers left Gawker, she was replaced by Choire Sicha, a former art dealer. Sicha was employed in this position until August 2004, at which point he was replaced by Jessica Coen, and she became editorial director of Gawker Media. Sicha left for the New York Observer six months after his promotion.

Later, in 2005, the editor position was split between two co-editors, and Coen was joined by guest editors from a variety of New York City-based blogs; Matt Haber was engaged as co-editor for several months, and Jesse Oxfeld joined for longer. In July 2006, Oxfeld's contract was not renewed, and Alex Balk was installed. Chris Mohney, formerly of Gridskipper, Gawker Media's travel blog, was hired for the newly created position of managing editor.

On September 28, 2006, Coen announced in a post on Gawker that she would be leaving the site to become deputy online editor at Vanity Fair. Balk shared responsibility for the Gawker site with co-editor Emily Gould. Associate editor Maggie Shnayerson also began writing for the site; she replaced Doree Shafrir, who left in September 2007 for the New York Observer.

In February 2007, Sicha returned from his position at the New York Observer, and replaced Mohney as the managing editor. On September 21, 2007, Gawker announced Balk's departure to edit Radar Magazine's website; he was replaced by Alex Pareene of Wonkette.

The literary journal n+1 published a long piece on the history and future of Gawker, concluding that, "You could say that as Gawker Media grew, from Gawker's success, Gawker outlived the conditions for its existence".

In 2008, weekend editor Ian Spiegelman quit Gawker because Denton fired his friend Sheila McClear without cause. He made that clear in several comments on the site at the time, also denouncing what he said was its practice of hiring full-time employees as independent contractors in order to avoid paying taxes and employment benefits.

On November 12, 2008, the company announced selling the popular blog site Consumerist and the folding of Valleywag, with managing editor Owen Thomas being demoted to a columnist on Gawker, and the rest of the staff being laid off.

In December 2009, Denton was nominated for "Media Entrepreneur of the Decade" by Adweek, and Gawker was named "Blog of the Decade" by the advertising trade.

In February 2010, Denton announced that Gawker was acquiring the "people directory" site CityFile.com, and was hiring that site's editor and publisher, Remy Stern, as the new editor-in-chief of Gawker. Gabriel Snyder, who had been editor-in-chief for the previous 18 months and had greatly increased the site's readership, released a memo saying he was being let go from the job.

In December 2011, A. J. Daulerio, former editor-in-chief of Gawker Media sports site Deadspin, replaced Remy Stern as editor-in-chief at Gawker. The company replaced several other editors, contributing editors, and authors; others left. Richard Lawson went to the Atlantic Wire, a blog of the magazine, The Atlantic Monthly.

In 2012, the website changed its focus away from editorial content and toward what its new editor-in-chief A. J. Daulerio called "traffic whoring" and "SEO bomb throws". In January 2013 Daulerio reportedly asked for more responsibility over other Gawker Media properties, but after a short time was pushed out by publisher Denton. Daulerio was replaced as editor-in-chief by longtime Gawker writer John Cook.

In March 2014, Max Read became the Gawker's editor-in-chief. In April 2014, using internet slang was banned per new writing style guidelines.

In June 2015, Gawker editorial staff voted to unionize. Employees joined the Writers Guild of America. Approximately three-fourths of employees eligible to vote voted in favor of the decision. Gawker staff announced the vote on May 28, 2015.

Following the decision to delete a controversial story in July 2015, Read and Gawker Media executive editor Tommy Craggs resigned in protest. Leah Beckmann, the site's then deputy editor, took over as interim editor in chief. She was replaced in October 2015 by Alex Pareene.

On August 18, 2016, Gawker announced that it would be shutting down after Univision Communications acquired Gawker Media's six other websites. These websites continued to operate under Univision which named the unit Gizmodo Media Group in an effort to distance itself from the Gawker name. Gawker's employees were transferred to the other six websites or elsewhere in Univision. While Univision initially acquired the Gawker website when it purchased the other websites, "Univision deemed the Gawker.com brand too toxic, and transferred it back to the bankruptcy estate". The Gawker website remained online after it ceased publication.

=== Under Bustle Digital Group (2018–2023) ===
Gawker logo used by Bustle

On July 12, 2018, Bryan Goldberg, owner of Bustle and Elite Daily, purchased Gawker.com in a bankruptcy auction for less than $1.5 million.

On January 16, 2019, it was announced Carson Griffith, Ben Barna, Maya Kosoff and Anna Breslaw were joining the staff of the new Gawker. However, on January 23, 2019, Kosoff and Breslaw announced they were quitting the site over offensive workplace comments made by Griffith. "We're disappointed it ended this way, but we can't continue to work under someone who is antithetical to our sensibility and journalistic ethics, or for an employer [CEO Bryan Goldberg] who refuses to listen to the women who work for him when it's inconvenient," Kosoff and Breslaw said in a statement.

In March 2019, Dan Peres was announced as the site's editor-in-chief. However, in August 2019, Peres, Griffith and the rest of the staff tasked with relaunching the site were laid off. "We are postponing the Gawker relaunch," a BDG spokesperson said. "For now, we are focusing company resources and efforts on our most recent acquisitions, Mic, The Outline, Nylon and Inverse." Kate Storey of Esquire outlined the leading theory on the failed relaunch was that it aimed to turn Gawker into "the prestigious, journalistic gem of BDG, kept afloat by the profits of other sites like Bustle and Elite Daily", however, "the BDG board and Goldberg soon lost interest in a site that was proving difficult to staff, a lightning rod for controversy, and, ultimately, expensive to operate (reporting is expensive) while not generating commensurate revenue".

In 2020, Griffith sued The Daily Beast, the site's editor-in-chief Noah Shachtman, and writer Maxwell Tani for defamation over an article about Kosoff and Breslaw's resignation over Griffith's comments. On March 24, 2021, a New York judge denied a motion to dismiss the lawsuit. On May 16, 2023, a New York appeals court dismissed the lawsuit.

In April 2021, it was reported that Gawker would relaunch with former Gawker writer Leah Finnegan tapped as editor-in-chief. Finnegan has said, of the tone of the relaunched site, that "[...] current laws of civility mean that no, it can't be exactly what it once was." The site relaunched on July 28, 2021.

On February 1, 2023, Bustle Digital Group announced that it would shut down Gawker as part of company-wide cuts.

=== Purchase by Meng Ru Kuok (2023–present) ===
In November 2023, the Gawker brand and domain were purchased by Meng Ru Kuok, the founder of Singapore-based venture capital firm Caldecott Music Group. Kuok stated a need for Gawker's reinvention and that "whatever plans materialize, what's for sure is that it won't be the same as it was before". However, the digital archive was not included in this purchase and all articles have been removed from the Gawker website.

== Staff ==
=== Editor in chief ===
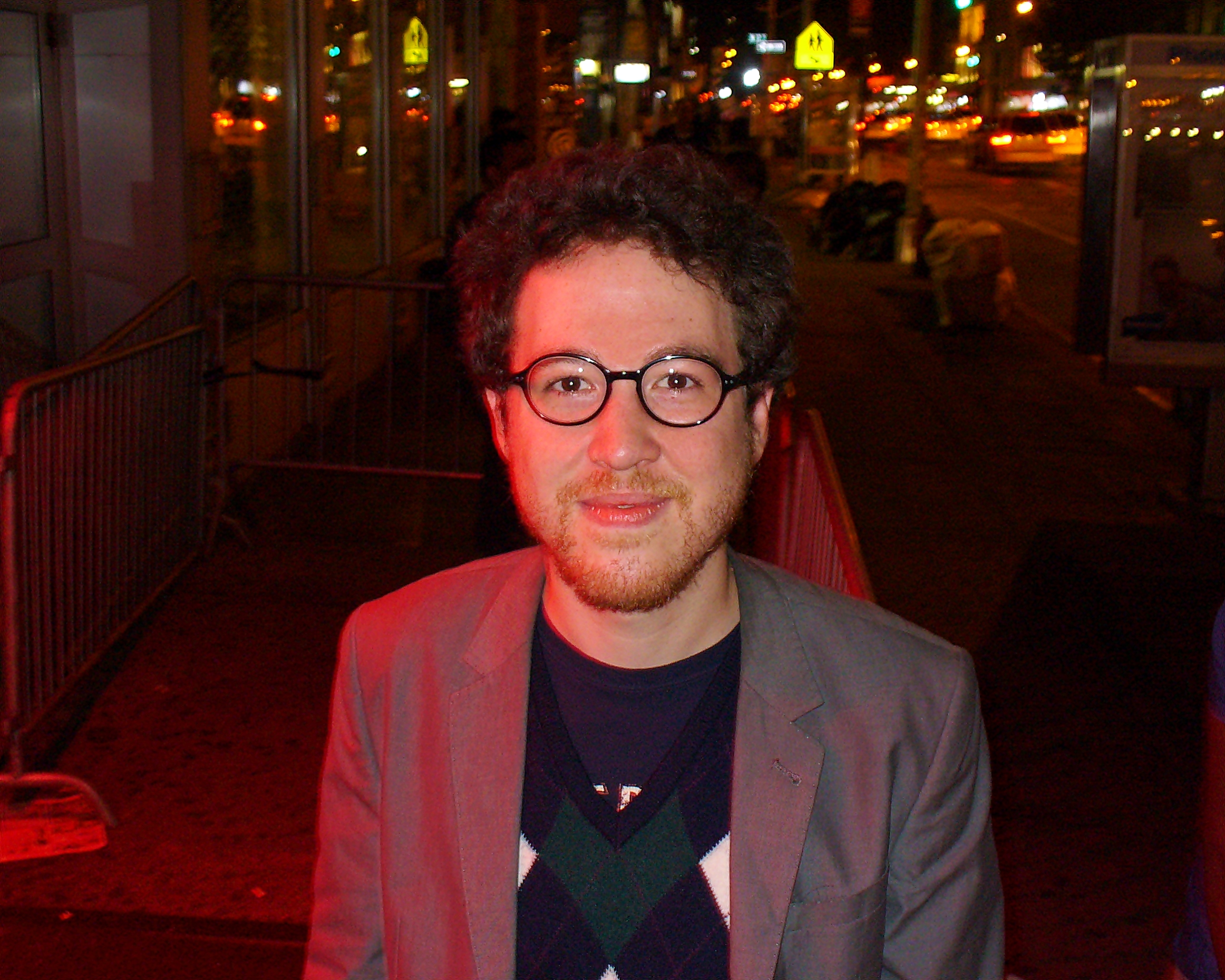
Alex Pareene, Gawker's editor-in-chief from 2015 to 2016

Editor-in-chief	Editor from	Editor to
Elizabeth Spiers	2003	2003
Choire Sicha	2003	2004
Jessica Coen	2004	2006
Jesse Oxfeld	2005	2006
Alex Balk	2006	2007
Emily Gould	2006	2007
Choire Sicha	2007	2007
Gabriel Snyder	2009	2010
Remy Stern	2010	2011
A.J. Daulerio	2012	2013
John Cook	2013	2014
Max Read	2014	2015
Leah Beckmann	2015	2015
Alex Pareene	2015	2016
Dan Peres	2019	2019
Leah Finnegan	2021	2023

== Content ==
Gawker usually published more than 20 posts daily during the week, sometimes reaching 30 posts a day, with limited publishing on the weekends. The site also published content from its sister sites. Gawker's content consisted of celebrity and media industry gossip, critiques of mainstream news outlets, and New York-centric stories. The stories generally came from anonymous tips from media employees, found mistakes and faux pas in news stories caught by readers and other blogs, and original reporting.

On July 3, 2006, when publisher Nick Denton replaced Jesse Oxfeld with Alex Balk, Oxfeld claimed it was an attempt to make the blog more mainstream and less media-focused, ending a tradition of heavy media coverage at Gawker.

Denton announced in a staff memo in November 2015 that the site was switching from covering New York and the media world to focus primarily on politics.

=== Archive ===
Gawker's website with its content initially remained online following its shutdown in 2016. This archive contained "over 200,000 articles". Christopher Bonanos of New York argued in 2016 that the Gawker archive was worth preservation – "the early content of Gawker, in particular, is of real significance in the history of journalism. [...] But whether you like it or not, or mimic it or not, what they did changed the way things are done. For that alone, it is (and will be) worth study, and is thus worth preserving". In 2017, academics Katherine Boss and Meredith Broussard commented that "the archives included, crucially, not just the articles but also the comments and the dialogue that readers had with the authors. Yet no advance plans had been made for Gawker's archives, and the abruptness of the bankruptcy and the sale, compounded by the controversial nature of the site and its implosion, made it even more difficult to save at the last minute". Their review of the independent archive status in July 2017 "showed that archive.org had more than 16,000 snapshots of www.gawker.com dating back to 2003, with substantial gaps in coverage [...]. Quality assurance of each post was hit or miss, and comments were also archived only intermittently". Maria Bustillos, for the Columbia Journalism Review in 2018, highlighted "what would be missing if the Gawker archive were to disappear" which includes the "roots" of public accusations on the misconduct of Louis C.K., Bill Cosby, and Harvey Weinstein. Bustillos opined that "in the absence of journalists willing to take such risks, it's not at all clear whether such stories would ever have come to light in the mainstream press".

In 2018, the Freedom of the Press Foundation independently archived the Gawker website and its articles via Archive-It. Parker Higgins, the Freedom of the Press Foundation's director of special projects, said they wanted to "reduce the 'upside' for wealthy individuals and organizations who would eliminate embarrassing or unflattering coverage by purchasing outlets outright. In other words, we hope that sites that can't simply be made to disappear will show some immunity to the billionaire problem". On the independent archive, The New York Times commented:

For readers, finding past coverage would be similar to using the Internet Archive's Wayback Machine. For journalists, the archives represent a line of defense against what some fear is an increasingly potent weapon. Readers and former employees of Gawker have fretted that its domain and archive could be bought by someone with little regard for the company’s onetime mission. [...] Mr. Higgins said the threat of an owner who would remove or change articles could have a chilling effect on the press, either by directly shutting publications or by encouraging self-censorship.

Research on the "archiving practices and policies" of various types of journalistic production by the Columbia Journalism Review in 2019 highlighted that interviewed news workers "frequently cited the case of Gawker [...] as a cautionary tale illustrating the precarity of digital news" and that "the Gawker and Gothamist cases both scared reporters who don't personally archive their own work, just as it demonstrated the role of news archives in democratic societies and the need for preservation policies that ensure the public with a faithful account of history".

As of November 2023, the Gawker website no longer displays its articles following the purchase of the Gawker brand without the purchase of the archive.

== Controversies ==
=== Gawker Stalker ===
On March 14, 2006, Gawker launched Gawker Stalker Maps, a mashup of the site's Gawker Stalker feature and Google Maps. After this, Gawker Stalker—originally a weekly roundup of celebrity sightings in New York City submitted by Gawker readers—was frequently updated, and the sightings are displayed on a map. The feature sparked criticism from celebrities and publicists for encouraging stalking. George Clooney's representative Stan Rosenfeld described Gawker Stalker as "a dangerous thing". Jessica Coen said that the map is harmless, that Gawker readers are "for the most part, a very educated, well-meaning bunch", and that "if there is someone really intending to do a celebrity harm, there are much better ways to go about doing that than looking at the Gawker Stalker".

On April 6, 2007, Emily Gould appeared on an edition of Larry King Live hosted by talk show host Jimmy Kimmel during a panel discussion titled "Paparazzi: Do They Go Too Far?" and was asked about the Gawker Stalker. Kimmel accused the site of potentially assisting real stalkers, adding that Gould and her website could ultimately be responsible for someone's death. Kimmel continued to claim a lack of veracity in Gawker's published stories, and the potential for libel it presents. At the end of the exchange Gould said that she didn't "think it was OK" for websites to publish false information, after which Kimmel said she should "check your website then."

=== Outing of Peter Thiel as gay ===
In 2007, Gawker published an article by Owen Thomas allegedly outing Silicon Valley venture capitalist Peter Thiel as gay, although Thomas contends the article did not constitute outing since Thiel's sexuality had been "known to a wide circle" in the Bay Area. This, together with a series of articles about his friends and others that he said "ruined people's lives for no reason", motivated Thiel to fund lawsuits against Gawker by people complaining their privacy had been invaded, including Hulk Hogan.

=== Tom Cruise video ===
On January 15, 2008, Gawker mirrored a Scientology video featuring Tom Cruise from a removed posting on YouTube. Gawker soon posted a copyright infringement notice written by lawyers for Scientology. By July 2009, the video had not been removed and no lawsuit had been filed.

=== Sarah Palin email leak ===
On September 17, 2008, in reporting that pranksters associated with 4chan had hacked the personal e-mail account of Alaska Governor and vice presidential candidate Sarah Palin, Gawker published screenshots of the emails, photos, and address list obtained by the hackers. While accessing personal e-mail accounts without authorization constitutes a federal crime, current DOJ interpretation of this statute following the decision in Theofel v. Farey-Jones is that perpetrators may be prosecuted only for reading "unopened" emails. FBI Spokesman Eric Gonzalez in Anchorage, Alaska, confirmed that an investigation was underway.

=== Christine O'Donnell ===
On October 28, 2010, Gawker posted an anonymous post entitled "I Had a One-Night Stand with Christine O'Donnell". The piece discussed an alleged sexual encounter with O'Donnell, the Republican nominee in the 2010 Senate special election in Delaware. However, according to the writer, O'Donnell only slept naked with the anonymous writer and did not have sex with him. The National Organization for Women condemned the piece as "slut-shaming". NOW's president, Terry O'Neill, stated, "It operates as public sexual harassment. And like all sexual harassment, it targets not only O'Donnell, but all women contemplating stepping into the public sphere." Salon's Justin Elliott criticized the ad hominem nature of the article, tweeting "Today, we are all Christine O'Donnell." Gawker reportedly paid in the "low four figures" for the story. Denton defended it, praising its "brilliant packaging".

=== 2010 data breach incident ===
On December 11, 2010, Gawker and Gizmodo were hacked by a group named Gnosis. The hackers gained root access to the Linux-based servers, access to the source code, access to Gawker's custom CMS, databases (including writer and user passwords), Google Apps, and real-time chat logs from Gawker's Campfire instance, in addition to the Twitter accounts of Nick Denton and Gizmodo. The hacker group stated that they went after Gawker for their "outright arrogance" and for a previous feud between Gawker and 4chan. Gawker asked all its users to change their passwords and posted an advisory notice as well.

The following day, a database dump of user credentials, chat logs, and source code of the Gawker website was made available on The Pirate Bay, among other BitTorrent trackers.

=== Chris Lee Craigslist emails ===
In February 2011, Gawker posted an email exchange between United States Congressman Chris Lee and a woman he had met through a personal ad on Craigslist. The emails included the married Lee describing himself as a divorced lobbyist and a photo of him posing shirtless. Lee resigned his Congressional seat within hours of Gawker's story.

=== Hulk Hogan sex tape ===
On October 4, 2012, Daulerio posted a short clip of Hulk Hogan and Heather Clem, the estranged wife of radio personality Todd Alan Clem, having sex. Hogan sent Gawker a cease-and-desist order to take the video down, but Denton refused. Denton cited the First Amendment and argued that the accompanying commentary had news value. Judge Pamela Campbell issued an injunction ordering Gawker to take down the clip. In April 2013, Gawker wrote, "A judge told us to take down our Hulk Hogan sex tape post. We won't." It also stated that "we are refusing to comply" with the order of the circuit court judge.

Gawker's actions were criticized as hypocritical since they heavily criticized other media outlets and websites for publishing hacked nude pictures of celebrities.

Hogan filed a lawsuit against Gawker and Denton for violating his privacy, asking for $100 million in damages; the trial was slated for July 2015. The cost of the lawsuit was partly funded by Peter Thiel, whom Gawker had previously outed in 2007. In January 2016, Gawker Media received its first outside investment by selling a minority stake to Columbus Nova Technology Partners. Denton stated that the deal was reached in part to bolster its financial position in response to the Hogan case.

In March 2016, Hogan was awarded $140 million in damages by a Florida jury in an invasion of privacy case over Gawker's publication of a sex tape: on March 18, Hogan was awarded $55 million for economic harm and $60 million for emotional distress; on March 21, 2016, the jury awarded Hogan a further $25 million in punitive damages. On November 2, Gawker reached a $31 million settlement with Hogan.

=== 2012 Michael Brutsch unmasking ===
On October 12, 2012, Adrian Chen posted an article identifying Reddit moderator Violentacrez as Michael Brutsch. In the days prior to publication of the story, Reddit's main politics channel, r/politics, and a number of other forums on the site banned Gawker links from their page; at one point, Gawker was banned from all of Reddit. Multiple commentators from Wired, CNET and The Next Web questioned the morality behind Brutsch's doxing, and began a debate over whether the exposé encouraged online vigilantism.

=== Intern wage suit ===
Gawker was sued by three former interns in 2013 for failing to pay them for producing revenue-generating content. In March 2016, the case was dismissed after US District Judge Alison Nathan concluded that the claims were outside the statute of limitations and failed under the 2nd Circuit's "primary beneficiary" test.

=== Condé Nast executive prostitution claims ===
On July 16, 2015, Gawker reporter Jordan Sargent posted a story about a gay porn star's alleged text correspondence with a married executive from a competing media company, Condé Nast. The article claimed Condé Nast CFO David Geithner had planned to go to Chicago to meet a male escort, and pay him $2,500 for sex. The article also claimed that after the escort requested Geithner settle the escort's housing dispute, he cancelled the meetup, and the escort went to Gawker to publicize the alleged incident. The post sparked heavy criticism for outing the executive, both within and outside Gawker. Denton removed the story the next day, after Gawker Media's managing partnership voted 4–2 to remove the post—marking the first time the website had "removed a significant news story for any reason other than factual error or legal settlement." On July 20, 2015, Gawker Media executive editor Tommy Craggs and Gawker.com editor-in-chief Max Read posted their resignations from the company, citing the lack of transparency by and independence from the company's management over the post's removal, rather than the concerns over the post's issues and received criticism, as the cause. Denton offered staff who disagreed with the actions a buyout option, which was accepted by staff including features editor Leah Finnegan and senior editor and writer Caity Weaver. Denton defended the story's writer, Sargent, who remained in his job.

According to The Daily Beast, "a source familiar with the situation said Gawker ultimately paid the subject of the offending article a tidy undisclosed sum in order to avoid another lawsuit." Gawker Media President and General Counsel Heather Dietrick declined to confirm or deny there was a settlement.

=== Bankruptcy ===
On June 10, 2016, Gawker Media and its associated subsidiaries Gawker Sales, Gawker Entertainment, Gawker Technology, and Blogwire filed for Chapter 11 bankruptcy in the Southern District of New York, following the loss of the Hogan lawsuit. CNBC also reported that Gawker Media would be put up for auction following the bankruptcy filing.

On August 18, 2016, Gawker Media announced that its flagship blog, gawker.com, would be ceasing operations the following week. Univision continued to operate Gawker Media's six other websites - Deadspin, Gizmodo, Jalopnik, Jezebel, Kotaku and Lifehacker. On August 22, 2016, Nick Denton wrote the final article for Gawker, titled "How Things Work".

In September 2016, Univision removed multiple articles which were published under Gawker Media: "two Gizmodo posts about Shiva Ayyadurai, who claims to have invented email; two Deadspin posts about former major league baseball player Mitch Williams; a Deadspin post about conservative provocateur Chuck Johnson; and a Jezebel post about Meanith Huon. Ayyadurai, Williams, Johnson and Huon have all sued Gawker Media for defamation over those posts".
