= Bollea v. Gawker =

Sex tape publicity lawsuit

- Court: Circuit Court of the Sixth Judicial Circuit in and for Pinellas County, Florida
- Full case name: Terry Gene Bollea, professionally known as Hulk Hogan, Plaintiff, v. Heather Clem; Gawker Media, LLC aka Gawker Media; Gawker Media Group, Inc. aka Gawker Media; Gawker Entertainment, LLC; Gawker Technology, LLC; Gawker Sales, LLC; Nick Denton; A.J. Daulerio; Kate Bennert, and Blogwire Hungary Szellemi Alkotast Hasznosito KFT aka Gawker Media, Defendants
- Citations: Gawker Media, LLC v. Bollea, 129 So.3d 1196 (Fla. 2d DCA 2014); 170 So.3d 125 (Fla. 2d DCA 2015)

Case history
- Prior actions: Injunction denied, Bollea v. Gawker Media, LLC, 913 F. Supp. 2d 1325 (M.D. Fla. 2012), motion to remand granted, Bollea v. Clem, 937 F. Supp. 2d 1344 (M.D. Fla. 2013)

Court membership
- Judge sitting: Pamela A. M. Campbell

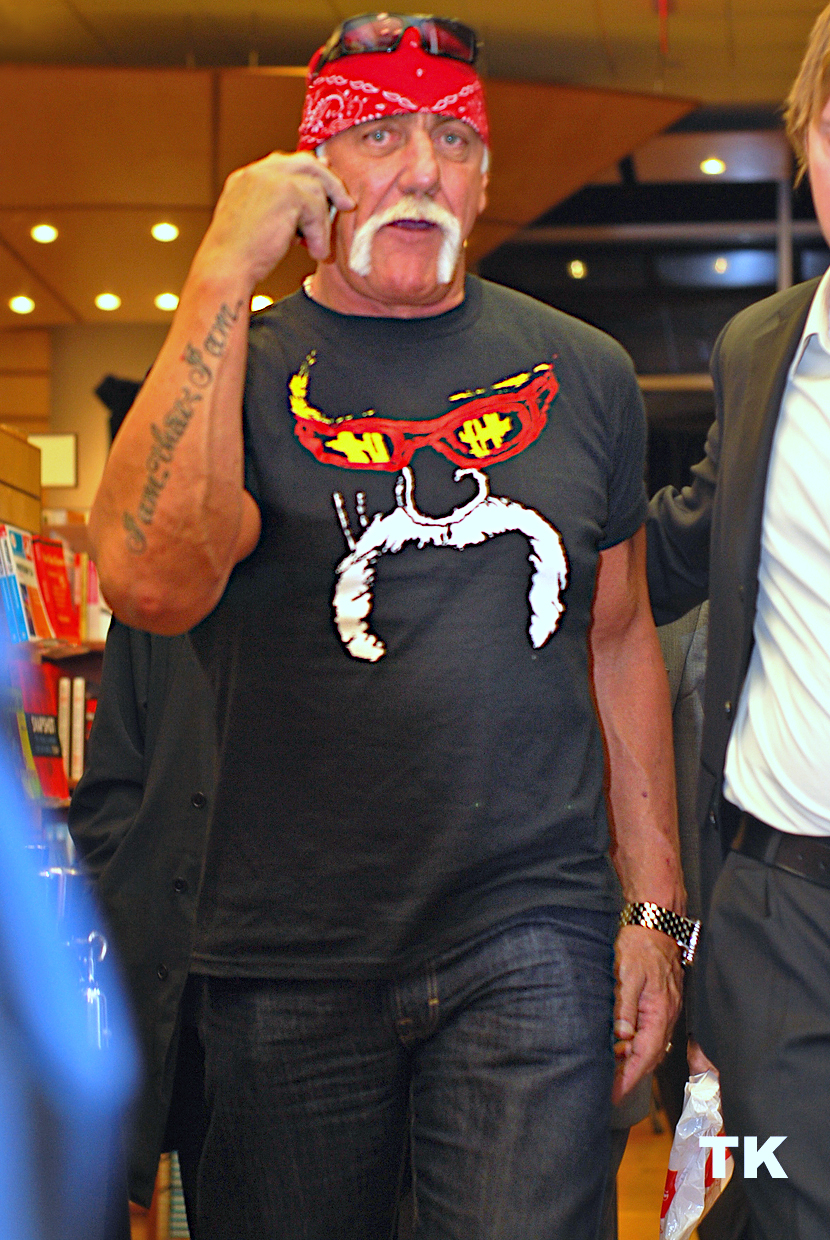
Terry Bollea, 2009

Bollea v. Gawker was a lawsuit filed in 2013 in the Circuit Court of the Sixth Judicial Circuit in Pinellas County, Florida, delivering a verdict on March 18, 2016. In the suit, professional wrestler Terry Gene Bollea, known professionally as Hulk Hogan, sued Gawker Media, publisher of the Gawker website, and several Gawker employees and Gawker-affiliated entities for posting portions of a sex tape of Bollea with Heather Clem, at that time the wife of radio personality Bubba the Love Sponge. Bollea's claims included invasion of privacy, infringement of personality rights, and intentional infliction of emotional distress. Prior to trial, Bollea's lawyers said the privacy of many Americans was at stake while Gawker's lawyers said that the case could hurt freedom of the press in the United States.

Bollea sought $100 million in damages. In March 2016, the jury found Gawker Media liable and awarded Bollea $115 million in compensatory damages and $25 million in punitive damages. Three months after the verdict, Gawker filed for Chapter 11 bankruptcy protection and put itself up for sale. Gawker Media's assets, not including the namesake website, were subsequently sold to Univision Communications. On November 2, 2016, Gawker reached a $31 million settlement with Bollea.

== Background ==
In 2006, Bollea was videotaped while having sex with Heather Clem; at trial he claimed that the videotaping was without his knowledge or consent. On The Howard Stern Show, Bollea told Stern that he had slept with Heather with Bubba Clem's blessing and his encouragement because he was so burnt-out from the trauma of his coming divorce that he finally gave in to the "relentless" come-ons from Heather who "kept going down that road." Bollea said that he knew that Clem had "an alternative lifestyle" and that he had stopped by their house "just to say hello" when Heather tempted him. Bollea later testified: "I was depressed. I gave up and gave in. I felt that those people loved me."

Bubba testified that he burned the video to a DVD, wrote "Hogan" on it, and put it in a desk drawer.

On October 4, 2012, Gawker editor A. J. Daulerio published a two-minute extract from the 30-minute video, including 10 seconds of explicit sexual activity.

== Preliminary injunction decisions ==
Bollea originally sued Gawker for copyright infringement in the United States District Court for the Middle District of Florida, seeking a temporary injunction. Bollea's lawyer was Charles Harder. U.S. District Judge James D. Whittemore denied Bollea's motion, ruling that the validity of the copyright was in question, and that given the degree to which Bollea had already put his own private life into the public arena, the publication of the video might be protected by fair use.

Bollea withdrew his case in the US district court and sued Gawker in Florida state court. There, his request for an injunction was granted by Judge Pamela Campbell in 2013. Gawker announced that it would not comply with the part of the court order requiring the removal of the post and associated commentary because it deemed the order "risible and contemptuous of centuries of First Amendment jurisprudence." Gawker removed the video itself, but linked readers to another site hosting the video.

The injunction was quickly stayed on appeal, and was denied in 2014 by the appeals court, which ruled that under the circumstances it was an unconstitutional prior restraint on speech under the First Amendment. Gawker tried to get Judge Campbell to dismiss the case based on that ruling, but the case went to trial.

== Trial and verdict ==
The six-person jury consisted of four women and two men. The trial lasted two weeks. During the trial, Gawker argued that Bollea made his sex life a public matter, although on cross-examination, when asked by Bollea's lawyer whether a depiction of his genitalia had any "news value", former Gawker editor A. J. Daulerio responded "no". Bollea said that comments made in interviews were done in his professional wrestling character, an on-air persona different from his own. The court was shown a taped deposition where Daulerio said that he would consider a celebrity sex tape non-newsworthy if the subject was under the age of four. Daulerio later told the court he was being flippant in his response.

On March 18, 2016, the jury delivered a verdict in favor of Bollea. The jury awarded him $115 million in compensatory damages, which included $60 million for emotional distress. The jury awarded Bollea an additional $25 million in punitive damages on March 21.

Reactions to the verdict ranged from those supporting it and decrying voyeuristic publications, to those describing it as of limited scope which does not damage free speech, to those describing the verdict and the large judgment as having a deeply chilling effect on journalism when courts can decide newsworthiness.

== Aftermath ==
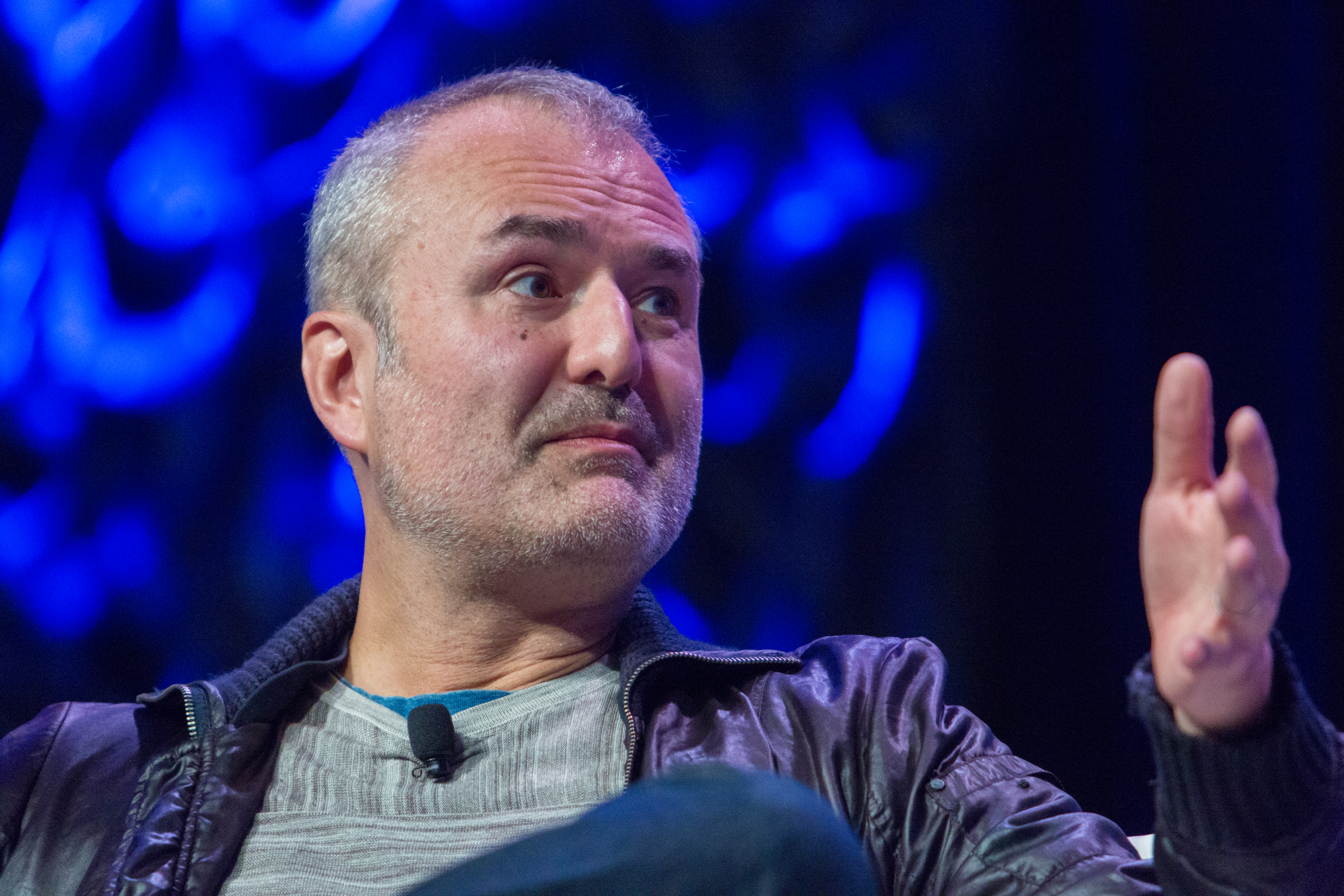
Nick Denton in 2017

Gawker CEO Nick Denton said the company would appeal the verdict. In early April 2016, Gawker Media filed two post-trial motions in the trial court. In one motion, the company sought to throw out the jury verdict, arguing that "key evidence was wrongly withheld" and the jury instructions on the constitutional standards for newsworthiness were improper. In another motion, Gawker argued that even if the verdict stands, the amount of damages should be greatly reduced, arguing that the emotional damage award exceeded amounts found to be excessive in severe personal injury cases and that the economic damages were improperly calculated. In late May 2016, the trial judge denied both motions.

In May 2016, it was reported that Bollea had sued Gawker again, alleging that they were responsible for leaking sealed court documents that had quoted him using racial slurs. The transcripts were published by the National Enquirer, and World Wrestling Entertainment (WWE) subsequently fired him. Gawker denied being responsible for the leak. Bollea would be re-signed by WWE on July 15, 2018.

Billionaire Peter Thiel, a co-founder of PayPal and former Facebook board member, paid $10 million to help finance lawsuits against Gawker Media, including the Bollea lawsuit. The idea had been brought to him by Australian businessman Aron D'Souza. Thiel called his financial support of Bollea's case "one of my greater philanthropic things that I've done." Gawker had published an article in 2007 outing Thiel as gay.

On June 9, 2016, Gawker filed a motion for a stay of execution of judgment pending appeal. In the motion and accompanying affidavits from Gawker Media personnel, the company stated that it could not afford to pay the $140.1 million judgment or the $50 million appeal bond.

On June 10, 2016, Gawker filed for Chapter 11 bankruptcy protection and put itself up for sale. Denton personally filed for Chapter 11 bankruptcy protection on August 1.

Univision Communications bought Gawker Media's assets for $135 million at a bankruptcy auction on August 16, 2016. The sale to Univision included six Gawker websites—Deadspin, Gizmodo, Jalopnik, Jezebel, Kotaku, and Lifehacker—which were not involved with the publication of the Bollea materials. The sale did not include the continued operations of the flagship Gawker website. On August 18, 2016, it was announced that the main Gawker site would be shut down by the following week. Gawker's article archive would remain online and its employees will either be transferred to the remaining six websites or elsewhere in Univision.

On November 2, 2016, Gawker Media and Bollea reached a $31 million settlement. As a result of the settlement, Gawker forwent its appeal and three articles from gawker.com were taken down, including the one involving Bollea.

In an open letter to Thiel after losing the case, Denton accused Thiel of making them "stripped naked", together with the warning "in the next phase, you too will be subject to a dose of transparency. However philanthropic your intention, and careful the planning, the details of your involvement will be gruesome." Later in 2025 though, Denton said that Thiel was right and did him a favor in forcing the sale of Gawker Media.

Other lawsuits followed naming Hiscox Insurance, Cox Radio, Terry Bollea, Mike Calta (of the Mike Calta Show), and Matthew Christian Lloyd (a radio personality formerly employed by Bubba the Love Sponge).

== See also ==
- Celebrity sex tape
