= Valleywag =

Gawker Media blog

- Homepage on April 17th, 2009
- Website type: Blog
- Available in: U.S. English
- Owner: Gawker Media
- Creator: Nick Douglas
- Website: valleywag.gawker.com
- Commercial: Yes
- Registration: Optional
- Launched: February 2006 (relaunched April 2013)
- Current status: Inactive

Valleywag was a Gawker Media blog with gossip about Silicon Valley personalities. It was initially launched under the direction of editor Nick Douglas in February 2006. After Douglas was fired, the blog was taken over by Owen Thomas. Thomas left in May 2009, replaced by Ryan Tate.

Valleywag was the first to break some stories, such as the leaking of a Gene Simmons sex tape. It was criticized for broadcasting unsubstantiated and damaging gossip about people who are not in the public eye, such as a college intern who falsely called in sick to work.

The blog ceased operating in February 2011, and the URL began directing to a Gawker page with a selection of technology industry-themed stories. In April 2013, Valleywag was resurrected under the editorship of Sam Biddle. In November 2015, the website was shut down again, as part of an effort to have Gawker become a politics site.

== Background ==
Valleywag launched in February 2006 with editor Nick Douglas. As a college student, Douglas had edited a gossip blog called Blogebrity.

In its first post, Valleywag outed the fact that Google founder Larry Page and high-ranking employee Marissa Mayer had dated for months. It shortly followed that with the revelation that Google CEO Eric Schmidt had an apparently open marriage and had joined a church (as documented on a Web page in Google's cache) with a girlfriend. The point of these articles was that the reporters and editors who covered Silicon Valley were well aware of these relationships and their potential impact on Google's stock price and brand reputation. They had tacitly agreed not to report them in order to curry favor with Google staff. Another popular early series of items pitted "famous for the Internet" tech celebrities against each other in beauty contests.

In November 2006, Douglas was fired. An internal memo about the departure surfaced, suggesting Douglas had become too focused on a small group of Internet entrepreneurs who had befriended him to get press coverage. The memo also quoted an interview he gave the R.U. Sirius Show (republished on a sister web site 10 Zen Monkeys) in which Douglas had joked that one of his goals for Valleywag was to get sued.

Gawker founder Nick Denton took over the editing duties until a replacement editor could be found. Douglas remained on as a part-time contributor. Under his reign, Denton broke such stories as Salesforce.com CEO Marc Benioff's attempt to detain a Wall Street Journal reporter, claiming that reporters were sitting on this story. Denton also recruited national magazine writer Paul Boutin to post a daily "Silicon Valley Users Guide" feature on local customs, politics and places, though Boutin subsequently dropped the column when he briefly rejoined Wired.

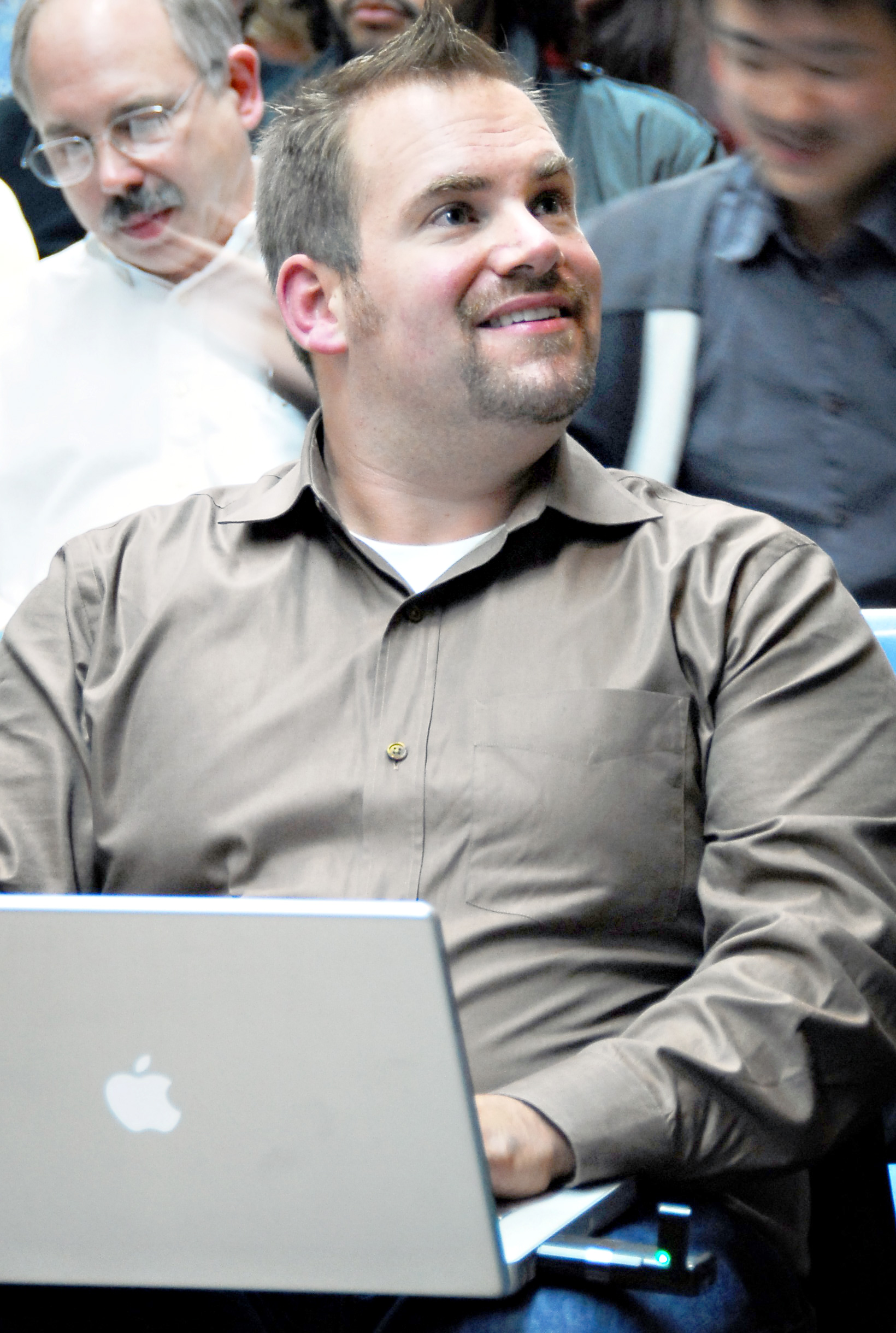
Valleywag's Owen Thomas blogging live from an event

In July 2007, Owen Thomas, formerly Business 2.0's online editor, with a career that stretched from Suck.com and Wired to Time and the Red Herring, assumed the role of managing editor. He added several staff members and contributors, "very special correspondent" Paul Boutin, associate editors Nicholas Carlson and Jackson West. In September 2007, Boutin published a list of 40 companies to be showcased by rival publication TechCrunch at a conference, again suggesting that reporters and bloggers were keeping the list—on display at the conference site—from their readers to gain favor with TechCrunch and the companies.

Valleywag posted a link to its automated traffic statistics on its front page. In March 2008, these stats showed an average of 131,000 visits and 189,000 pageviews per day, with 2 million visits and 3 million pageviews in December. It was one of the top 100 technology news sites, according to Techmeme. Mainstream technology reporters John Markoff, Walt Mossberg and David Pogue acknowledged that they read the site regularly, and had their emails to Valleywag published on the site.

In fall 2008, associate editors Nicholas Carlson and Jackson West and reporter Melissa Gira Grant were laid off, leaving Owen Thomas and Paul Boutin to run the site. This was part of an overall restructuring by Gawker Media, described in a memo by Nick Denton as shifting resources to the most commercially successful Gawker sites, away from the focus on increasing traffic, in view of the 2008 credit crisis.

On November 12, Nick Denton informed Owen Thomas that Valleywag would be folded, laying off Paul Boutin, with Thomas taking over a column on its parent site Gawker.

In April 2013, Valleywag was resurrected under the editorship of Sam Biddle.

== Criticism and controversy ==
Critics of Nick Denton argue that Valleywag was created in order to give himself leverage over Silicon Valley companies.

The website made several high-profile mistakes in reporting stories. Editor Nick Denton twice misreported the identity of the author of the Fake Steve Jobs blog, before Daniel Lyons was outed as the true author. Stating he "ought to have known better", Owen Thomas falsely reported that a drunk employee caused a major power outage at data center 365 Main by relying on the gossip of an unidentified source. Industry analyst and speaker Dave Taylor, who runs several technical and business websites, pointed out, "In journalism school, you would never even think about sharing any gossip of this nature without at least two reliable sources, but that never stopped Owen, nor did it stop other bloggers from picking up the incendiary story and shining a very negative light on the Web server hosting company in question."

Under Thomas, the site became known for unsubstantiated gossip and "linkbait", or stories whose substance lay solely in the title, making it a tempting link for other on-line sites but that effectively only "baited" traffic to Valleywag. A small-but-influential tech website hosted by Y Combinator, Hacker News, banned stories from Valleywag. Y Combinator founder Paul Graham wrote "Several users have suggested we ban Valleywag, not for anything in particular that they write about, but because their articles are always such deliberate linkbait. I personally agree. In 99% of Valleywag articles, the most interesting thing is the title." Sixty percent of Hacker News readers voted yes to the ban.

Several Silicon Valley writers questioned the tactics of Valleywag and similar sites, especially in the wake of the suicide death of executive Paul Tilley, who came under fierce attacks from anonymous bloggers. Writing in TechCrunch, Michael Arrington, himself a focus of Valleywag's posts, wondered when Valleywag would be the cause of a suicide:

[For] people in Silicon Valley, who are not celebrities and who have no desire other than to build a great startup, a post on Valleywag comes as a huge shock. Seeing your marriage woes, DUI or employment termination up on a popular public website (permanently indexed by search engines) is simply more than they can handle. They have not had the ramp up time to build resistance to the attacks.

Responding in The Daily Telegraph technology blog, Shane Richmond felt Arrington had a conflict-of-interest in writing the column: "As for Mr Arrington's suggestion, which basically amounts to 'I wish everyone would be nicer', I imagine it's largely motivated by the fact that, as he acknowledges in his post, he's a frequent target of Valleywag himself."
