= Nick Denton =

British Internet entrepreneur and journalist (born 1966)

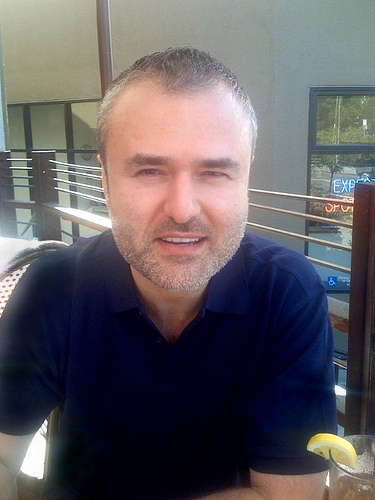
- Denton in 2007
- Born: 24 August 1966 (age 59); Hampstead, London, UK
- Education: University College School, University College, Oxford
- Occupation: Internet entrepreneur
- Known for: founder of Gawker Media and managing editor of Gawker

Nicholas Guido Anthony Denton (born 24 August 1966) is a British Internet entrepreneur, journalist, and blogger. He is the founder and former proprietor of the blog collective Gawker Media, and he was the managing editor of the New York City–based Gawker until a lawsuit by Hulk Hogan bankrupted the company.

== Early life ==
Denton grew up in Hampstead in London, the son of British economist Geoffrey Denton and his wife, Marika (née Marton), a Hungarian Jew who survived the Nazis during the Holocaust in Hungary and escaped the Soviet 1956 invasion of Hungary at age 18. A psychotherapist, she died of cancer the year before her son moved to New York City. Denton has a younger sister, Rebecca.

He was educated at University College School (UCS) and University College, Oxford, where Denton studied Philosophy, Politics and Economics. He also became the editor of the university's magazine, The Isis Magazine.

== Career ==
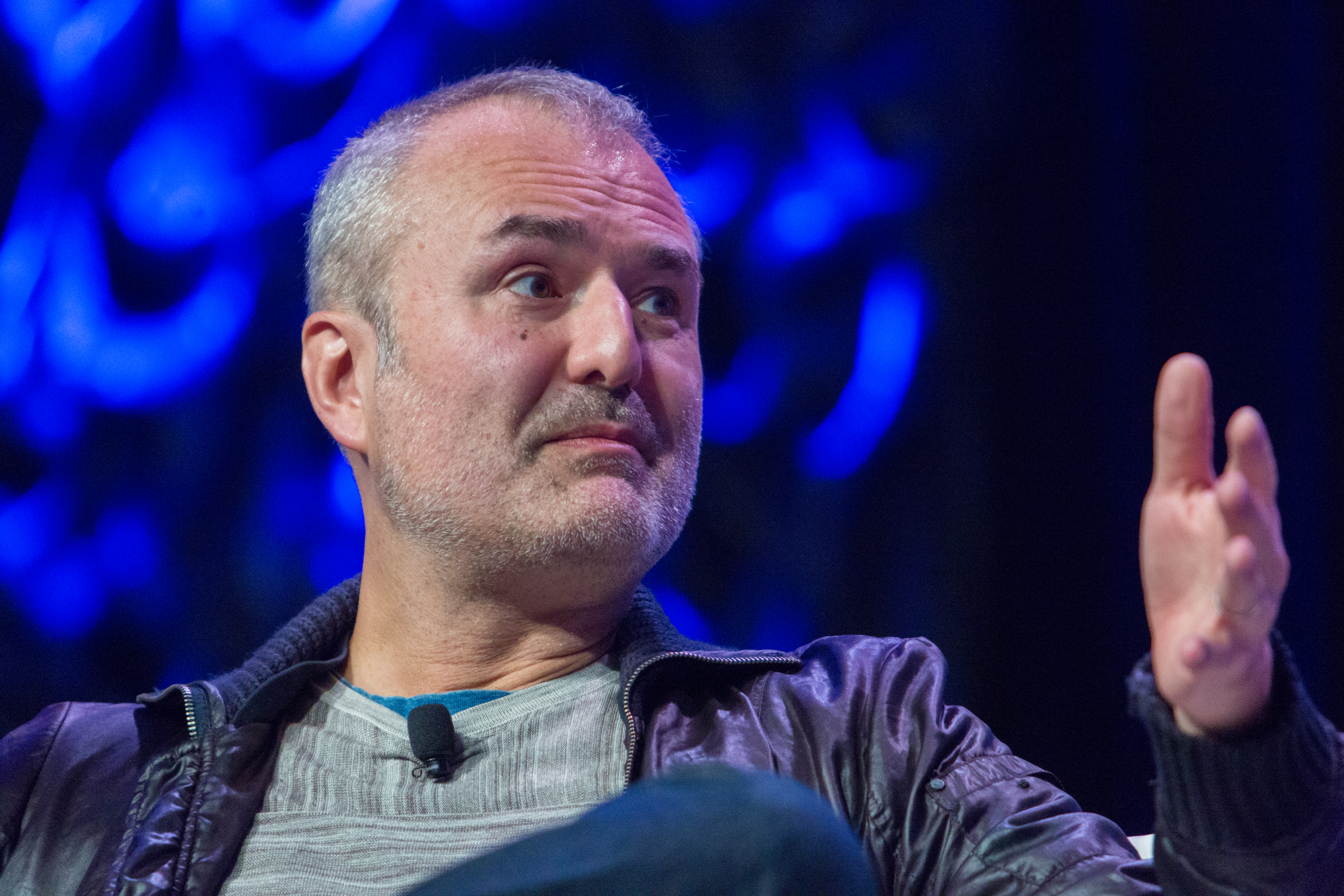
Denton in 2017

Denton began his career as a journalist with the Financial Times, a British daily business newspaper. He co-wrote a book about the collapse of Barings Bank, the oldest merchant bank in London, called All That Glitters (1996).

He was a co-founder in 1998 of a social networking site, First Tuesday. That same year Denton co-founded media-monitoring service Moreover Technologies with David Galbraith and Angus Bankes, schoolmates from UCS. Shortly after, he moved to San Francisco in the United States, and in the summer of 2002 he moved to New York City.

=== Gawker Media ===
Denton founded Gawker Media in 2002, initially running the company out of his apartment in New York City's SoHo, Manhattan. Gawker Media initially had only two internet sites — Gawker (a news and gossip site) and Gizmodo (a gadgets and technology blog). Gawker Media blogs expanded to include Jezebel (aimed at women), and Deadspin (a sports site), as well as Lifehacker (tips to live life better), Jalopnik (automotive culture), io9 (science, futurism, and science fiction), and Kotaku (video games and culture). In 2008 Gawker sold music site Idolator to Buzz Media, Gridskipper to Curbed, and consumer affairs site Consumerist to Consumers Union. In 2010, Gawker Media attracted 17.5 million US visitors per month. Up until 2012, Denton paid himself a salary of $60,000 a year.

Gawker had revenue of $48.7 million in 2015. Most of its assets were sold to Univision for $135 million following the Bollea v. Gawker lawsuit loss and ensuing 2016 Chapter 11 bankruptcy.

== Controversies ==
=== Peter Thiel ===
In 2007, Denton's Valleywag editor Owen Thomas outed Silicon Valley billionaire businessman Peter Thiel as gay in a post entitled "Peter Thiel is totally gay, people." In the comment section of Thomas's post, Denton speculated as to why Thiel kept "his personal life a secret from journalists... for so long." He named "a guy called Matt" as an alleged boyfriend. In response, Thiel called Valleywag the "Silicon Valley equivalent of Al Qaeda". Thiel said the sites were "scar[ing] everybody" and stifling the culture of Silicon Valley, which is "supposed to be about people who are willing to think out loud and be different."

It was later revealed in 2016 that Thiel had paid $10 million in legal expenses to finance several lawsuits brought by others against Denton and Gawker Media, including a lawsuit by Hulk Hogan. Denton publicly blamed Thiel several times for having planned to take down Gawker.com.

=== Nouriel Roubini ===
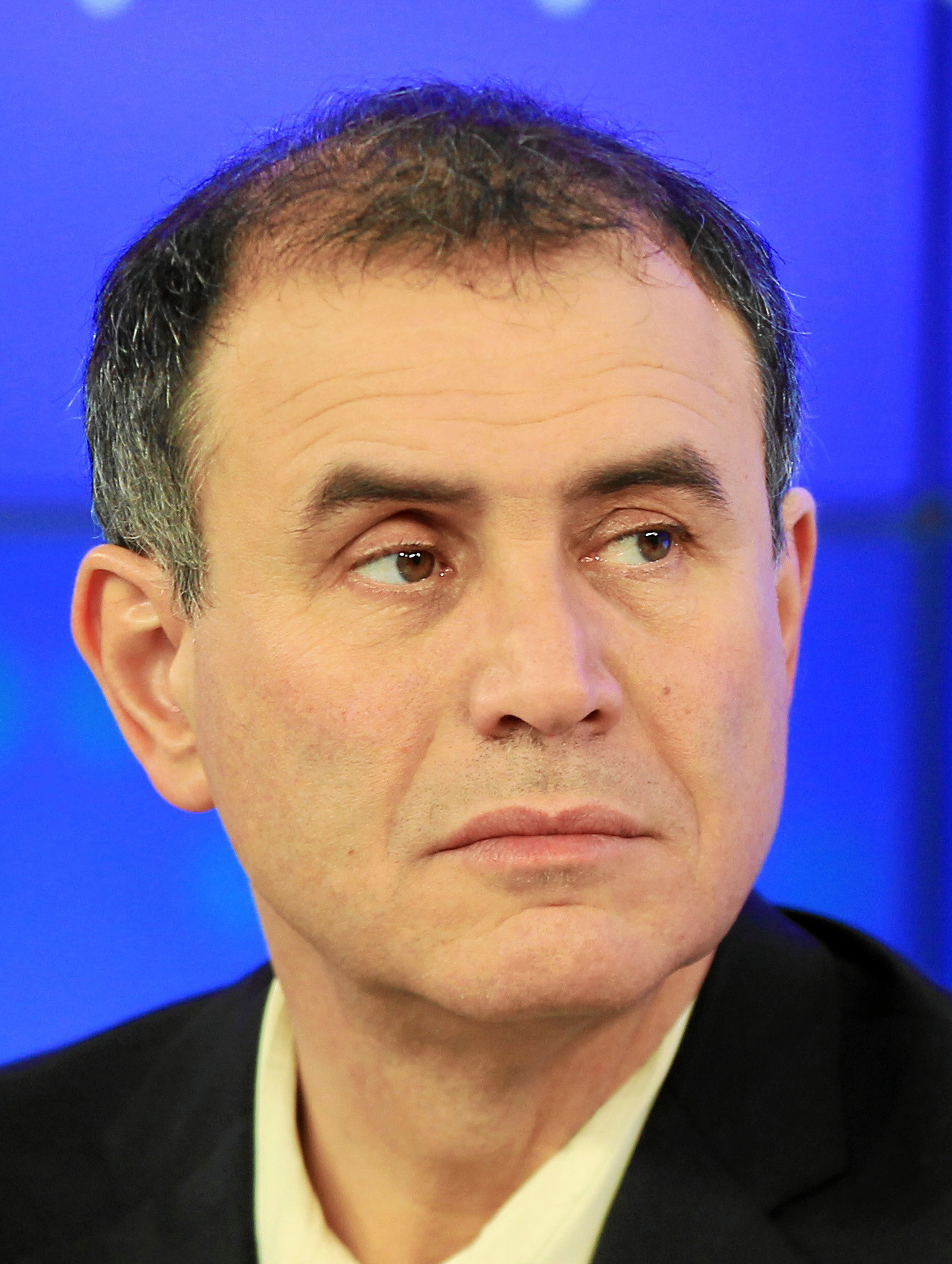
Nouriel Roubini

In 2008, after Denton wrote a post labeling economist Nouriel Roubini a playboy who lived in a “vulva-" and "vagina-encrusted Tribeca loft", Roubini reacted by posting a message on Denton's Facebook page, accusing him of "Nazi-style anti-Semitism." Roubini also called Denton an ignorant antisemite with a Nazi mind, a McCarthyist bigot, and a hypocrite, noted that Denton was gay, accused him of being a stalker, and added: “You are a loser and an intellectual dwarf who cannot engage me on my widely respected views on the economy … too bad [sic] was the first one that early on predicted in minute and precise details this most severe financial crisis.”

When asked about the exchange by a reporter for The Guardian, the reporter said Roubini then "reprises the rant, embellishing it with references to the KGB, Denton's sexual orientation, and a sweary suggestion of what the man might do with himself, which he belatedly asks me not to quote.... the piece of art in question is described by Roubini as the work of a highly regarded feminist artist whom he won't name and which doesn't, he assures me, look anything like a vulva." Denton for his part commented: "How can such a brilliant economist, at the height of his reputation, be quite so clueless?"

=== Christine O'Donnell ===
On 28 October 2010, Denton published an anonymous kiss-and-tell piece entitled, "I Had a One-Night Stand with Christine O'Donnell". However, according to the writer, O'Donnell only slept naked with the anonymous writer, and did not have sex with him. The National Organization for Women condemned the piece as "slut-shaming". NOW's president, Terry O'Neill, said, "It operates as public sexual harassment. And like all sexual harassment, it targets not only O'Donnell, but all women contemplating stepping into the public sphere." Salon's Justin Elliott criticized the ad hominem nature of the article, tweeting "Today, we are all Christine O'Donnell." Gawker.com reportedly paid in the "low four figures" for the story. Denton defended it, praising its "brilliant packaging."

=== Hulk Hogan and bankruptcy ===
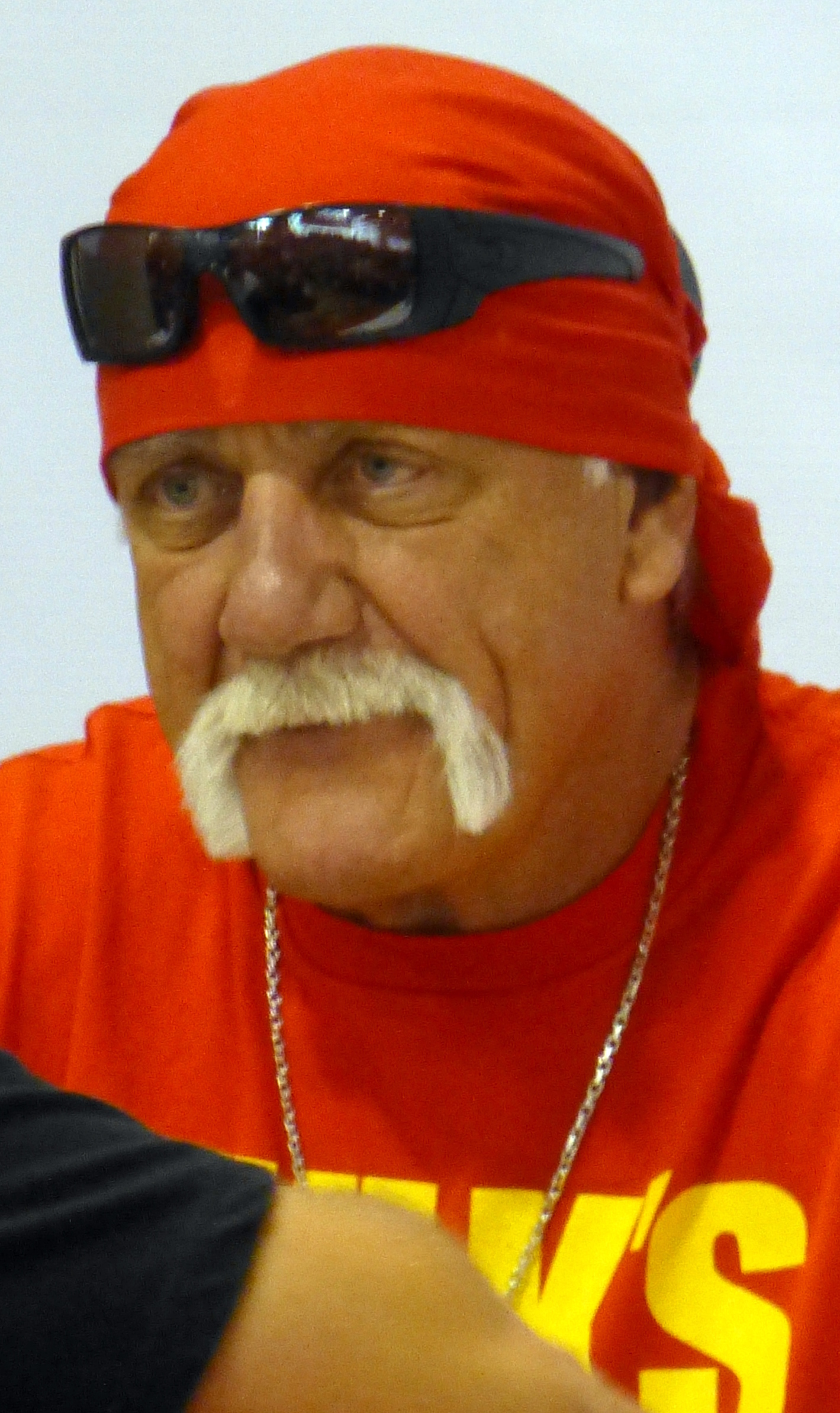
Hulk Hogan

On October 4, 2012, Gawker published an extract from a leaked sex tape of former professional wrestler Hulk Hogan. After Denton refused to comply with a cease-and-desist order from Hogan and a court injunction to remove the video, Hogan sued Gawker for violation of privacy. Billionaire Peter Thiel paid Hogan's legal team $10 million, as he was angry at Gawker for an earlier story reporting that Thiel was gay. On March 18, 2016, the jury found in favor of Hogan and awarded him $115 million, which included $55 million in compensatory damages and $60 million for emotional distress. On March 21, the jury awarded Hogan an additional $25 million in punitive damages, including $10 million from Denton personally. Denton filed for Chapter 11 bankruptcy protection on August 1, 2016. On March 22, 2017, Hogan and Denton reached a settlement that allowed Denton to emerge from personal bankruptcy.

== Personal life ==
Denton was featured in the Sunday Times Rich List 2007 in position #502, with an estimated wealth of £140 million based on the sale of his previous companies and the then-current value of Gawker Media.

On 31 May 2014, Denton married actor Derrence Washington. He lives in New York City.
