= Gawker Media =

British-American online media company and blog network

Gawker Media LLC
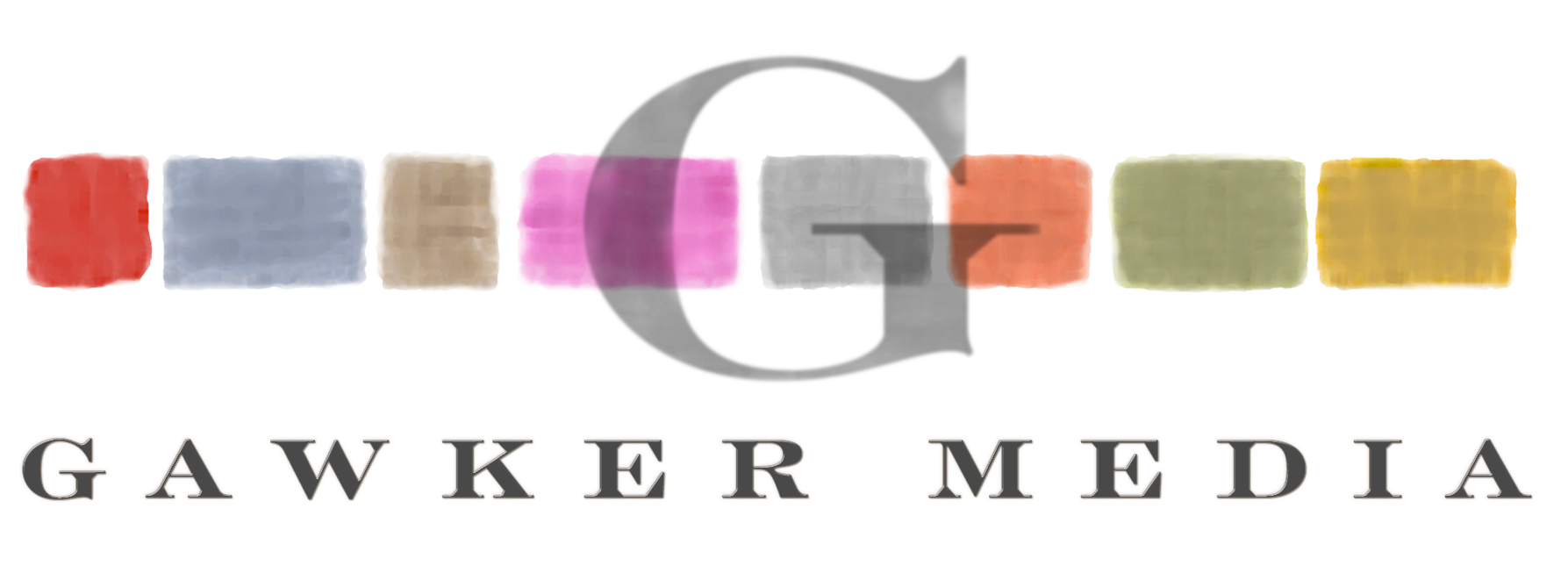
- Formerly: Blogwire, Inc. (2003–04); Gawker Media, Inc. (2004)
- Type: Privately held company
- Founded: October 9, 2003; 23 years ago
- Founder: Nick Denton
- Defunct: 21 September 2016; 10 years ago (12 years, 11 months and 12 days)
- Fate: Filed for United States Chapter 11 bankruptcy protection and liquidation; acquired by Univision Communications; sold to Great Hill Partners
- Successors: Gizmodo Media Group; G/O Media
- Headquarters: New York City, US
- Key people: Nick Denton (founder); Elizabeth Spiers (founder, Gawker.com); Gina Trapani (founder, Lifehacker)
- Subsidiaries: Deadspin; Defamer; Fleshbot; Gawker; Gizmodo; Gridskipper; io9; Jalopnik; Jezebel; Kotaku; Lifehacker; Oddjack; Screenhead; Sploid; Wonkette; Valleywag
- Website: gawker.com

Gawker Media LLC (formerly Blogwire, Inc. and Gawker Media, Inc.) was an American internet media company and blog network. It was founded by Nick Denton in October 2003 as Blogwire, and was based in New York City. Incorporated in the Cayman Islands, as of 2012, Gawker Media was the parent company for seven different weblogs and many subsites under them: Gawker.com, Deadspin, Lifehacker, Gizmodo, Kotaku, Jalopnik, and Jezebel. All Gawker articles are licensed on a Creative Commons attribution-noncommercial license. In 2004, the company renamed from Blogwire, Inc. to Gawker Media, Inc., and to Gawker Media LLC shortly after.

On June 10, 2016, the company filed for Chapter 11 bankruptcy protection after damages of $140 million were awarded against the company as a result of the Hulk Hogan sex tape lawsuit. On August 16, 2016, all of the Gawker Media brands, assets except for Gawker.com, were acquired at auction by Univision Communications for $135 million. Two days later on August 18, the company announced that Gawker.com would cease operations the following week, while its other sites would continue to operate.

On September 21, 2016, Univision moved all of the Gawker Media properties to their newly created Gizmodo Media Group.

Gizmodo was subsequently acquired by Great Hill Partners along with The Onion in 2019 under the G/O Media Inc. umbrella, reportedly for less than $50 million.

== Ownership, finances, and traffic ==
While Denton has generally not gone into detail over Gawker Media's finances, he made statements in 2005 that downplayed the profit potential of blogs declaring that "[b]logs are likely to be better for readers than for capitalists. While I love the medium, I've always been skeptical about the value of blogs as businesses", on his personal site.

In an article in the February 20, 2006 issue of New York Magazine, Jossip founder David Hauslaib estimated Gawker.com's annual advertising revenue to be at least $1 million, and possibly over $2 million a year. Combined with low operating costs—mostly web hosting fees and writer salaries—Denton was believed to be turning a healthy profit by 2006. In 2015, Gawker Media LLC released its audited revenue for the past five years. In 2010, its revenue was $20 million and operating income of $2.6 million. Gawker Media's revenues steadily increased through 2014 and its audited revenue for 2014 was $45 million with $6.5 million operating income. Business Insider valued the company at $250 million based upon its 2014 revenue. In early 2015, Denton stated that he planned to raise $15 million in debt from various banks so as not to dilute his equity stake in the company by accepting investments from venture capital firms.

In June 2016, Gawker Media revealed its corporate finances in a motion for a stay of judgment pending appeal and accompanying affidavits filed in the Bollea v. Gawker case in Florida state court. In the filings, the company stated that it could not afford to pay the $140.1 million judgment or the $50 million appeal bond. The company's balance sheet at the time reflected total assets of $33.8 million ($5.3 million cash, $11.9 million accounts receivable, $12.5 million fixed assets), total current liabilities of $27.7 million; and total long-term liabilities of $22.8 million. A bond broker stated in an affidavit that the company's book value was $10 million.

In June 2016, at the time of the company's filing for bankruptcy, Denton had a 29.52% stake in the Gawker Media Group, and his family had another stake through a trust.

== History ==
Gawker Media was incorporated in Budapest, Hungary in 2002. The company was headquartered early on at Nick Denton's personal residence in the New York City neighborhood of SoHo, and it remained there until 2008. That year, he created a new base of operations in Nolita in Manhattan.

On April 14, 2008, Gawker.com announced that Gawker Media had sold three sites: Idolator, Gridskipper, and Wonkette. In a fall 2008 memo, Denton announced the layoff of "19 of our 133 editorial positions" at Valleywag, Consumerist, Fleshbot, and other sites, and the hiring of 10 new employees for the most commercially successful sites—Gizmodo, Kotaku, Lifehacker, and Gawker—and others which were deemed to promise similar commercial success (Jezebel, io9, Deadspin, and Jalopnik). Denton also announced the suspension of a bonus payment scheme based on pageviews, by which Gawker had paid $50,000 a month on the average to its staff, citing a need to generate advertising revenue as opposed to increasing traffic. He explained these decisions by referring to the 2008 credit crisis, but stated that the company was still profitable. In September 2008, Gawker reported 274 million pageviews.

On November 12, 2008, Gawker announced that Valleywag would fold into Gawker.com. Consumerist was sold to Consumers Union, which took over the site on January 1, 2009.

On February 22, 2009, Gawker announced that Defamer.com would fold into Gawker.com.

In October 2009, Gawker Media websites were infected with malware in the form of fake Suzuki advertisements. The exploits infected unprotected users with spyware and crashed infected computer's browsers. The network apologized by stating "Sorry About That. Our ad sales team fell for a malware scam. Sorry if it crashed your computer". Gawker shared the correspondence between the scammers and it via Business Insider.

On February 15, 2010, Gawker announced it had acquired CityFile, an online directory of celebrities and media personalities. Gawker's Editor-in-Chief Gabriel Snyder announced that he was being replaced by CityFile editor Remy Stern.

=== Source code breach ===
On December 11, 2010, the Gawker group's 1.3 million commenter accounts and their entire website source code was released by a hacker group named Gnosis. Gawker issued an advisory notice stating: "Our user databases appear to have been compromised. The passwords were encrypted. But simple ones may be vulnerable to a brute-force attack. You should change your Gawker password and on any other sites on which you've used the same passwords". Gawker was found to be using DES-based crypt(3) password hashes with 12 bits of salt. Security researchers found that password cracking software "John the Ripper" was able to quickly crack over 50% of the passwords from those records with crackable password hashes. Followers of Twitter accounts set up with the same email and password were spammed with advertisements. The Gnosis group notes that with the source code to the Gawker content management system they obtained, it will be easier to develop new exploits.

=== 2011 redesign and traffic loss ===
As part of a planned overhaul of all Gawker Media sites, on 1 February 2011, some Gawker sites underwent a major design change as part of the larger roll-out. Most notable was the absence of formerly present Twitter and StumbleUpon sharing buttons. Nick Denton explained that Facebook had been by far the biggest contributor to the site's traffic and that the other buttons cluttered the interface. This decision lasted three weeks, after which the buttons were reinstated, and more added.

On 7 February 2011, the redesign was rolled out to the remainder of the Gawker sites. The launch was troubled due to server issues. Kotaku.com and io9.com failed to load, displaying links, but no main content, and opening different posts in different tabs did not work, either. The new look emphasised images and de-emphasised the reverse chronological ordering of posts that was typical of blogs. The biggest change was the two-panel layout, consisting of one big story, and a list of headlines on the right. This was seen as an effort to increase the engagement of site visitors, by making the user experience more like that of television. The site redesign also allowed for users to create their own discussion pages, on Gawker's Kinja. Many commenters largely disliked the new design, which was in part attributed to lack of familiarity.

Rex Sorgatz, designer of Mediaite and CMO of Vyou, issued a bet that the redesigns would fail to bring in traffic, and Nick Denton took him up on it. The measure was the number of page views by October recorded on Quantcast. Page views after the redesign declined significantly—Gawker's sites had an 80% decrease in overall traffic immediately after the change and a 50% decrease over two weeks—with many users either leaving the site or viewing international versions of the site, which hadn't switched to the new layout. On 28 February 2011, faced with declining traffic, Gawker sites allowed for visitors to choose between the new design and the old design for viewing the sites. Sorgatz was eventually determined to be the winner of the bet, as at the end of September, 2011, Gawker had only 500 million monthly views, not the 510 million it had had prior to the redesign. However, on 5 October 2011, site traffic returned to its pre-redesign numbers, and as of February 2012, site traffic had increased by 10 million over the previous year, according to Quantcast. As of March 23, 2012, commenting on any Gawker site required signing in with a Twitter, Facebook, or Google account.

=== Leaked Quentin Tarantino script ===
In January 2014, Quentin Tarantino filed a copyright lawsuit against Gawker Media for distribution of his 146-page script for The Hateful Eight. He claimed to have given the script to six trusted colleagues, including Bruce Dern, Tim Roth, and Michael Madsen. Due to the spreading of his script, Tarantino told the media that he would not continue with the movie. "Gawker Media has made a business of predatory journalism, violating people's rights to make a buck," Tarantino said in his lawsuit. "This time they went too far. Rather than merely publishing a news story reporting that Plaintiff's screenplay may have been circulating in Hollywood without his permission, Gawker Media crossed the journalistic line by promoting itself to the public as the first source to read the entire Screenplay illegally."

=== Collective action ===
On 22 June 2013, unpaid interns brought a Fair Labor Standards Act action against Gawker Media and founder Nick Denton. As plaintiffs, the interns claimed that their work at sites io9.com, Kotaku.com, Lifehacker.com, and Gawker.TV was "central to Gawker's business model as an Internet publisher," and that Gawker's failure to pay them minimum wage for their work therefore violated the FLSA and state labor laws. Although some interns had been paid, the court granted conditional certification of the collective action.

In October 2014, a federal judge ruled that notices could be sent to unpaid interns throughout the company who could potentially want to join the lawsuit. A federal judge later found that the claims of interns who joined the suit as plaintiffs were outside the statute of limitations.

On March 29, 2016, a federal judge ruled in favor of Gawker, noting that the plaintiff had correctly been deemed an intern instead of an employee and was the primary beneficiary of his relationship with Gawker Media.

=== Unionization ===
In June 2015, Gawker editorial staff voted to unionize. Employees joined the Writers Guild of America, East. Approximately three-quarters of employees eligible to vote voted in favor of the decision. Gawker staff announced the vote on May 28, 2015.

=== Condé Nast executive prostitution claims ===
In July 2015, Gawker staff writer Jordan Sargent published an article attempting to "out" a married executive at Condé Nast, over a gay porn star's alleged text correspondence. The post sparked heavy criticism for outing the executive, both internally and from outsiders. Denton removed the story the next day, after Gawker Media's managing partnership voted 4-2 to remove the post—marking the first time the website had "removed a significant news story for any reason other than factual error or legal settlement."

Gawker's Executive Editor and Editor-in-Chief resigned after the story was dropped from Gawker's website.

According to The Daily Beast, "a source familiar with the situation said Gawker ultimately paid the subject of the offending article a tidy undisclosed sum in order to avoid another lawsuit."

=== Daily Mail defamation lawsuit ===
In September 2015, Gawker published a first-person narrative by a former employee of British tabloid, the Daily Mail, which was critical of the journalistic standards and aggregation policies for its online presence. The Daily Mail sued for defamation, stating the article contained "blatant, defamatory falsehoods intended to disparage The Mail." In August 2016, it was reported that Gawker was in the final stages of settling the lawsuit."

=== Hulk Hogan sex tape ===
On October 4, 2012, A. J. Daulerio, a Gawker editor, posted a short clip of Hulk Hogan and Heather Clem, the estranged wife of radio personality Bubba the Love Sponge, having sex. Hogan (who went by his real name, Terry Gene Bollea, during the trial) sent Gawker a cease-and-desist order to take the video down, but Denton refused. Denton cited the First Amendment and argued the accompanying commentary had news value. Judge Pamela Campbell issued an injunction ordering Gawker to take down the clip. In April 2013, Gawker wrote, "A judge told us to take down our Hulk Hogan sex tape post. We won't." It also stated that "we are refusing to comply" with the order of the circuit court judge. Hogan filed a lawsuit against Gawker and Denton for violating his privacy, asking for $100 million in damages.

In May 2016, billionaire Peter Thiel confirmed in an interview with The New York Times that he had paid $10 million in legal expenses to finance several lawsuits brought by others, including the lawsuit by Terry Bollea (Hogan) against Gawker Media. Thiel referred to his financial support of Bollea's case as "one of my greater philanthropic things that I've done." Thiel was reportedly motivated by anger over a 2007 Gawker article that had outed him as gay.

During the Hogan lawsuit trial Daulerio told the court that he would consider a celebrity sex tape non-newsworthy if the subject was under the age of four. Daulerio later told the court he was being flippant in his statements.

In January 2016, Gawker Media received its first outside investment by selling a minority stake to Columbus Nova Technology Partners. Denton stated that the deal was reached in part to bolster its financial position in response to the Hogan case. On March 18, 2016, the jury awarded Hulk Hogan $115 million in compensatory damages. On March 21, the jury awarded Hogan an additional $25 million in punitive damages, including $10 million from Denton personally. Denton said the company would appeal the verdict. On April 5, Gawker began the appeal process. On November 2, Gawker reached a $31 million settlement with Bollea and dropped the appeal.

=== Teresa Thomas lawsuit ===
Following the Hulk Hogan lawsuit, Teresa Thomas, a former employee at Yahoo!, filed a lawsuit against Gawker alleging the site said she was dating her boss, and therefore invaded her privacy and defamed her.

=== 2016 Chapter 11 bankruptcy protection ===
On June 10, 2016, Gawker filed for Chapter 11 bankruptcy protection, and reports suggested that the company might be negotiating with potential buyers, including a stalking horse offer from Ziff Davis for "under $100 million".

=== Asset seizure ===
On July 29, 2016, in a meeting with the courts, Denton was chastised for inflating the value of his equity in Gawker. The presiding judge stated that Denton informed the court that the value of his stock was valued at eighty-one million dollars. This valuation was used to give the court and Hogan the impression that Denton's stock would cover the majority of the money owed by the company. However, the stock was found to be valued at thirty million, and not the cited eighty-one million. In the wake of this revelation, the court found that Denton had not acted in good faith, and issued an order stating that Hogan could begin seizing assets from Gawker.

=== Univision Communications acquisition and subsidiary era (2016–present) ===
On August 16, 2016, Univision Communications paid $135 million at auction to acquire all of Gawker Media and its brands. This ended Gawker Media's fourteen years of operation as an independent company, as it was planned at that time to become a unit of Univision.

On August 18, 2016, Gawker.com, Gawker Media's flagship site, announced that it would be ceasing operations the week after. Univision continued to operate Gawker Media's six other websites, Deadspin, Gizmodo, Jalopnik, Jezebel, Kotaku, and Lifehacker. Gawker's article archive remains online, and its employees were transferred to the remaining six websites or elsewhere in Univision. On August 22, 2016, at 22:33 GMT, Denton posted Gawker's final article.

On September 10, 2016, Univision removed six controversial posts from various Gawker Media sites, each with the note: "This story is no longer available as it is the subject of pending litigation against the prior owners of this site."

== List of blogs previously operated by Gawker Media ==
=== Sold to Univision, renamed Gizmodo Media Group ===
- Deadspin – Sports
- Gizmodo – Gadget and technology lifestyle
- Jalopnik – Cars and automotive culture
- Jezebel – Celebrity, sex, and fashion for women
- Kotaku – Video games and East Asian pop culture
- Lifehacker – Productivity tips
- Sploid – shut down in 2006 but revived and merged into Gizmodo

=== International sites ===
- Gizmodo en Español – Hispanic
- Australia (owned by Allure Media)
  - Gizmodo Australia – Gadgets and technology
  - Kotaku Australia – Games and gaming industry coverage
  - Lifehacker Australia – Tips, tricks, tutorials, hacks, downloads and guides

=== Sold or defunct prior to Univision sale ===
- Gawker.com – New York City media, politics and gossip; Shut down August 22, 2016, now owned by Bustle Digital Group.
- Screenhead – Shut down in 2006.
- Idolator – Music, sold to Buzz Media in 2008.
- Wonkette – Sold to its managing editor Ken Layne in 2008
- Gridskipper – Sold to Curbed in 2008
- Consumerist – Consumer affairs, sold to Consumers Union in 2008.
- Valleywag – Silicon Valley news and gossip, shut down in 2008
- Defamer – Shut down in 2015
- Fleshbot – Sex and sex industry coverage, sold in 2012 to Fleshbot's editor Lux Alptraum.
- io9 – Science, science fiction, and futurism; merged into Gizmodo in 2015.
- Cink – Hungarian blog, defunct in 2015.

== See also ==
- Kinja
- Weblogs, Inc.
