= Kinja (website) =

Online news aggregator

- Website type: news aggregator
- Dissolved: 2025; 1 year ago
- Owner: G/O Media
- Website: kinja.com
- Commercial: Yes
- Launched: April 2004; 22 years ago
- Current status: Defunct

Kinja was a free online news aggregator, launched in April 2004. It was operated by G/O Media. It was formerly operated by Gizmodo Media Group, which was purchased by Univision Communications during Gawker Media's bankruptcy.

== History ==
With the intention of making blogs more accessible to the public, Nick Denton of Gawker Media and Meg Hourihan of Pyra Labs created Kinja, which began as an investigation into the navigation of blogs. It was dubbed Kinja in October 2003.

On February 11, 2013, Kinja 1.0 was launched on Jalopnik. Changes included an entire site and platform redesign, favoring a more Tumblr-esque design. Users received the ability to create their own blogs on Kinja, replacing the old profile system. Comments, replies, and posts all aggregate on the user's personal blog.

On March 11, 2013, Kinja was launched on Gawker Media blogs io9 and Deadspin, followed by Kotaku on March 25, 2013; Jezebel on April 8, 2013; Lifehacker on April 15, 2013; and Gizmodo on April 29, 2013.

In 2017, following Univision Communications' purchase of Gawker Media assets and their reorganization as Gizmodo Media Group, the company began to migrate some of its existing websites to Kinja as well, including The A.V. Club, Fusion (whose online editorial operation was later re-launched as Splinter), The Root, and The Onion. As of April 2018, ClickHole is also on the Kinja platform. The move was made as Univision staff were heavily interested in Kinja's "inset" feature for external links—which can display Amazon.com affiliate links with product thumbnails and prices, as they can be used to generate e-commerce revenue.

The Kinja website quit working sometime within July to August 2025, with requests for the website resulting in a Fastly unknown domain error as seen in the Wayback Machine starting sometime between those dates.

== Usage ==
Kinja was a personal web service that allows its users to "bookmark" blogs, Kinja providing the user with excerpts of recent posts of the chosen blogs. These excerpts, known as personal "digests", are compiled into one page of excerpts, with other categorized compilations available based on such labels as media, music, liberal, conservative, and more. A user's personal selection of digests is easily available to any outside user, allowing others to share their favorite blogs and recent blog posts. Utilizing a webcrawler dubbed Kinjabot (similar to Google's webcrawlers), Kinja creates an internal index of all available weblogs as defined by Kinjabot.

The name "Kinja" was also used as the name of the platform that G/O Media's blogs ran on, and as "Kinja Deals" on The Inventory blog that previously belonged to G/O Media before G/O Media sold the blog.

== Sources ==
- "Blog-Bleary? Try (What Else?) a Blog". The New York Times. April 1, 2004.
- "Gawker Media Staffers Are Still Ambivalent About Kinja". BuzzFeed News. 2014-08-12.
- Stoeffel, Kat (2012-06-27). "Deadliest Klatsch: Nick Denton Gives Gawker's Drive-By Peanut Gallery a Promotion". Observer.
- Feinberg, Ashley (2019-11-01). "The Media-Sensational Rise and Fall of "Jim Spanfeller Is a Herb"". Slate. ISSN 1091-2339.
