= The A.V. Club =

Online newspaper and entertainment website

- Type: Popular culture, entertainment, news, reviews, politics, progressive
- Format: Internet
- Owner: Paste Media Group
- Editor-in-chief: Danette Chavez
- Founded: 1993; 33 years ago
- Language: English
- Headquarters: Los Angeles, California, U.S.
- Website: avclub.com

The A.V. Club is an online newspaper and entertainment website featuring reviews, interviews, and other articles that examine films, music, television, books, games, and other elements of pop-culture media. The A.V. Club was created in 1993 as a supplement to its satirical parent publication, The Onion. Since March 2024, it is owned by Paste Media and unassociated with The Onion.

While it was a part of The Onion's 1996 website launch, The A.V. Club had minimal presence on the website at that point. A 2005 website redesign placed The A.V. Club in a more prominent position, allowing its online identity to grow. Unlike The Onion, The A.V. Club is not satirical. The publication's name is a reference to audiovisual (AV) clubs typical of American high schools.

== History ==
In 1993, five years after the founding of The Onion, Stephen Thompson, a student at the University of Wisconsin–Madison, launched an entertainment section of the newspaper. Its name refers to audio visual clubs offered by American high schools during the late 20th century for students to use and learn about equipment like speakers and projectors.

Alongside The Onion's move from Madison, Wisconsin, to New York City in early 2001, the A.V. Club staff also left Madison to move into The Onion's satellite office in Chicago. However, Thompson chose to stay in Madison, and in December 2004, Thompson was fired from his position as founding editor.

In 1996, both The Onion and The A.V. Club debuted on the Internet. The A.V. Club was originally a subsection of the main theonion.com domain. The supplement was moved to its own domain name, theavclub.com, before the 2005 acquisition of the shorter avclub.com domain name. The latter change coincided with a redesign that incorporated reader comments and blog content. In 2006, the website shifted its content model to add content on a daily, rather than weekly, basis. Some contributors have become established as freelance writers and editors.

According to Sean Mills, then-president of The Onion, the A.V. Club website first reached more than 1 million unique visitors in October 2007. In late 2009, the website was reported to have received more than 1.4 million unique visitors and 75,000 comments per month.

At its peak, the print version of The A.V. Club was available in 17 different cities. Localized sections of the website were also maintained with reviews and news relevant to specific cities. The print version and localized websites were gradually discontinued, and in December 2013, print publication ceased production in the last three markets.

On 9 December 2010, the website ComicsComicsMag revealed that a capsule review for the book Genius, Isolated: The Life and Art of Alex Toth had been fabricated. The book had not yet been published nor even completed by the authors. After the review was removed, editor Keith Phipps posted an apology on the website, stating that the reporter being assigned to review the book could not locate a copy of it ("for obvious reasons"), so they fabricated it. Leonard Pierce, the author of the review, was terminated from his freelance role with the website.

=== 2012–2014 staff departures ===
On 13 December 2012, long-time writer and editor Keith Phipps, who oversaw the website after Stephen Thompson left, stepped down from his role as editor of The A.V. Club. He said, "Onion, Inc. and I have come to a mutual parting of the ways." On 2 April 2013, long-time film review editor and critic Scott Tobias stepped down as film editor of The A.V. Club. He said via Twitter, "After 15 great years @theavclub, I step down as Film Editor next Friday."

On 26 April 2013, long-time writers Nathan Rabin, Tasha Robinson, and Genevieve Koski announced they would also be leaving the website to begin work on a new project with Scott Tobias and Keith Phipps. Koski also said that she would continue to write freelance articles. Writer Noel Murray announced he would be joining their new project, while continuing to contribute to The A.V. Club in a reduced capacity. On 30 May 2013, those six writers were announced as becoming part of the senior staff of The Dissolve, a film website run by Pitchfork Media.

In April and June 2014, senior staff writers Kyle Ryan, Sonia Saraiya, and Emily St. James left the website for positions at Entertainment Weekly, Salon, and Vox Media, respectively. In 2015, Ryan returned to Onion, Inc. for a position in development. Following his departure from The Dissolve earlier that month, Nathan Rabin returned to write freelance for the A.V. Club website in May 2015. He renewed his regular column "My World of Flops". The Dissolve folded in July 2015.

=== Univision era ===
In January 2016, Univision Communications acquired a 40% controlling stake in Onion Inc., the parent company of The A.V. Club. Later that year, Univision also purchased Gawker Media and reorganized several of Gawker's sites into the new Gizmodo Media Group, a division of Fusion Media Group.

On 16 February 2017, The A.V. Club's editor-at-large, John Teti, posted an article on the website announcing the upcoming release of a television series, titled The A.V. Club, based on the website. The series, hosted by Teti, began airing on Fusion on 16 March 2017 and ran for one season. The series featured news, criticism, and discussions about various popular-culture topics and featured staff members from the website.

The site was subsequently migrated from Bulbs, an internal content management system developed by Onion Inc., to the Gawker-developed Kinja platform. Audience reviews hosted on the previous site were deleted and the Kinja comment system was heavily derided by the site's commenting community, leading to a sharp decline in activity.

==== Unionization ====
In March 2018, employees announced they had unionized with the Writers Guild of America, East. The union comprises "all of the creative staffs at Onion Inc.: The A.V. Club, The Onion, ClickHole, The Takeout, Onion Labs, and Onion Inc.'s video and art departments." (ClickHole was acquired by Cards Against Humanity in February 2020.) The union was recognized on 20 April 2018 and reached a contract agreement with management on 20 December 2018. The contract includes "annual pay increases, minimum pay grades, strong diversity and anti-harassment language, just cause, union security, editorial independence, intellectual property rights, and an end to permalancers."

=== G/O Media era ===
In July 2018, Univision announced it was looking for a buyer for the entire Gizmodo Group. In April 2019, Gizmodo and The Onion were sold to private-equity firm Great Hill Partners, which combined them into a new company named G/O Media. In early 2020, former People magazine and Entertainment Weekly editor Patrick Gomez was named editor-in-chief, and it was announced that the site was opening a Los Angeles bureau. In August 2021, Yahoo! Entertainment and E! Online alum Scott Robson joined to lead the team.

On 18 January 2022, the union representing staff at the website announced that all seven staff members based in Chicago had taken severance as opposed to accepting a mandatory move of work location to Los Angeles. This predominantly affected the senior staff of the site and comprised the managing editor, film editor, TV editor, associate editor, senior writer, assistant editor, and editorial coordinator. After this, the headquarters of the A.V. Club was moved to Los Angeles.

=== Paste Media era ===
In March 2024, it was reported that G/O Media had sold The A.V. Club to Paste Media, who had previously bought the dormant G/O Media sites Jezebel and Splinter News for a relaunch. This resulted in The A.V. Club being completely separated from The Onion, with G/O Media selling The Onion to Global Tetrahedron the following month. Two employees were laid off as part of the transition. Paste Media CEO Josh Jackson stressed that Paste and The A.V. Club would not be consolidated together and assured that the comments, briefly disabled by G/O Media, would be restored.

In June 2024, various changes were announced, including that the A.V. Undercover web series would be revived after a 7-year hiatus, A.I. written articles during the G/O Media era would be removed, familiar writers would return (including Nathan Rabin and Ignatiy Vishnevetsky), and a subscriber program will be introduced. In July 2024, Danette Chavez, a writer and editor for The A.V. Club from 2015 to 2022, rejoined the website as editor-in-chief.

Endless Mode, a spin-off of Paste's games section that launched in July 2025, merged with The A.V. Club's games section just five months later in November, with Garrett Martin remaining editor of the section. In May 2026, Kotaku and Aftermath reported that the games vertical was effectively shuttered after Paste Media laid off The A.V. Club Games staff, including Martin. The A.V. Club stated it was refocusing its film and television coverage, however, the website "will continue to have some games coverage, but we cannot sustain a full-time staff covering it with our smaller team".

== Awards ==
In 2017, The A.V. Club won an Eisner Award for "Best Comics-related Periodical/Journalism" (for works published in 2016). The award went to writers Oliver Sava, Caitlin Rosberg, Shea Hennum, and Tegan O'Neil. The award also went to editor Caitlin PenzeyMoog.

== A.V. Club year-end and decade-end lists ==
Starting in 1999, only lists written by individual writers were published. Beginning in 2006, The A.V. Club began publishing website-consensus, year-end album and film rankings, together with lists created by individual writers, followed by annual rankings of television shows from 2010 onward. Additionally, decade-end lists were published for the 2000s and 2010s.

== Books ==
- Thompson, Stephen; A.V. Club Staff (10 December 2002). The Tenacity of the Cockroach: Conversations With Entertainment's Most Enduring Outsiders. Three Rivers Press. ISBN 978-0609809914.
- A.V. Club Staff (13 October 2009). Inventory: 16 Films Featuring Manic Pixie Dream Girls, 10 Great Songs Nearly Ruined by Saxophone, and 100 More Obsessively Specific Pop-Culture Lists. Scribner. ISBN 978-1416594734.
- Rabin, Nathan (19 October 2010). My Year of Flops: The A.V. Presents One Man's Journey Deep Into the Heart of Cinematic Failure. New York: Scribner. ISBN 978-1439153123.
- Handlen, Zack; Emily St. James (16 October 2018). Monsters Of The Week: The Complete Critical Companion To The X-Files. New York: Abrams Press. ISBN 978-1419732478.
