= Dodai Stewart =

American writer and editor

Dodai Stewart is an American writer and editor. In October 2018, she started as a deputy editor on the Metro desk at The New York Times. She was previously editor-in-chief at Splinter News. Before that, she was Fusion's executive editor, and was the deputy editor of Jezebel for seven years.

== Early life ==
Stewart moved to New York when she was seven years old.

== Career ==
Stewart went to New York University, Tisch School Of The Arts, for screenwriting. One of her early jobs was at J-14, a teen magazine. Stewart joined Fusion as director of culture coverage in 2014, part of a "big-name hiring spree" of "hot-shot journalists on which Fusion is pinning its hopes," including Alexis Madrigal previously of The Atlantic, Felix Salmon from Reuters, and Anna Holmes, previously Stewart's editor at Gawker Media site Jezebel. Fusion's website later became Splinter.

Before departing for Fusion, Stewart was deputy editor at Jezebel; she had joined the site shortly after Anna Holmes launched it in July 2007. Madame Noire describes Stewart's work at Jezebel as "one of those much-needed strong female voices in media. Moreover, she’s been an advocate for diversity in fashion, diversity of thought and diversity in beauty. She checks the tabloids for their body shaming ways. And then gives us pictures of pretty dresses (and calls out the ugly ones)."

== Personal life ==
Her great uncle is Ollie Stewart, a former correspondent for The Afro-American newspaper.
