= David Roth (writer) =

American writer (born 1978)

- Born: February 17, 1978 (age 48)
- Education: Pomona College
- Occupation: Writer
- Writing career
- Subjects: Sports; politics; popular culture

David Roth (born February 17, 1978) is an American journalist, essayist, podcast host, and editor. He has written about sports, politics, and culture in Deadspin, The New Republic, SB Nation, New York Magazine, New York Daily News, and other publications. Roth was a senior editor for Deadspin until he and the majority of staff resigned in 2019 in disagreement with new management. Roth and other ex-Deadspin staff co-founded Defector Media the following year. He is a lifelong fan of the New York Mets and writes about the organization extensively.

== Early life ==
Roth was born and raised in Ridgewood, New Jersey. With his father's encouragement, he became an avid fan of the New York Mets and the New Jersey Nets. From 1996 to 2000, Roth attended Pomona College where he wrote for the school newspaper, The Student Life. His favorite novel is Moby Dick by Herman Melville.

== Career ==
Roth began his career writing and editing content for the backs of Topps baseball, basketball, and football trading cards. In 2008, Roth became the co-author of The Wall Street Journal's "Daily Fix" sports blog. Beginning in 2009, Roth wrote material for MLB.com's fantasy baseball platform. He was an editor of The Classical which he co-founded in 2011. Throughout this time, he also wrote freelance for various websites, including The Awl and Can't Stop the Bleeding. In 2013–2014, he was a staff writer at SB Nation. He was then a contributing editor at Vice Sports.

His essay "Downward Spiral," originally published in The Baffler, was included in The Best American Sports Writing 2018.

Since 2018, Roth and political columnist Jeb Lund have co-hosted a comedy podcast about Hallmark movies called It's Christmastown.

=== Deadspin (2017–2019) ===
Roth was hired by Deadspin in 2017, and worked there as editor-at-large. In addition to contributing written pieces, Roth hosted the show Let's Remember Some Guys, in which he used sports trading cards to reminisce about ballplayers from past generations. Roth and Drew Magary co-hosted the Deadcast, Deadspin's flagship podcast.

Starting October 30, 2019, Roth and the majority of editorial staff began resigning from Deadspin out of dissatisfaction with new management. Editorial director Paul Maidment had sent an internal memo instructing writers to "stick to sports". Roth and other staff disagreed with the new directive, found it to infringe editorial independence, and contended that political commentary was among the site's most-read content. The last staff member resigned on November 1. Maidment resigned within a week of the mass resignation.

After leaving Deadspin, Roth continued sports writing freelance. He was nominated for a Society for American Baseball Research (SABR) Analytics Conference Research Awards award for a New Republic article. He has written editorials about Donald Trump, describing him in 2020 as "America's petty, TV-addled, and increasingly degenerate president." Roth previously maintained an active presence on Twitter but has since deleted his account. He has written critically of Elon Musk's acquisition as similar to "burn[ing] the house down with everyone inside it", saying "Musk moved quickly, and broke things—the things and systems and livelihoods he was determined to break, but also the technology that prevented the site from boosting animal torture videos."

=== Defector Media (2020–present) ===
Roth and other former Deadspin writers co-founded Defector Media in 2020, with a worker-owned subscription-driven business model. Roth and Magary co-host The Distraction: A Defector Podcast, a sports podcast launched on August 13, 2020.

Roth again received SABR Analytics Conference Research Awards nominations in 2025 and 2026 for Defector articles.

== See also ==
- New Yorkers in journalism
