= Hell Gate NYC =

Online worker-owned publication focused on New York City news

Hell Gate
- Good blogs for the greatest city.
- Logo since July 8, 2024
- Format: Digital
- Founders: Nick Pinto; Esther Wang; Christopher Robbins; Max Rivlin-Nadler; Sydney Pereira
- Staff writers: 7
- Founded: May 2, 2022
- Headquarters: Bowery
- City: New York City
- Circulation: 11,000 paid subscribers (as of October 2026)
- Price: USD $7 per month
- Website: hellgatenyc.com

Hell Gate NYC is an online worker-owned publication focused on local New York City news. The publication is named after the Hell Gate Bridge, due to the bridge's reputation for tenacity. Hell Gate covers a wide range of topics that include, but are not limited to, political corruption, local street performers, policing, and strange subway advertisements. The company is headquartered in a co-working space in Brooklyn, and has five reporters and two editors, all worker-owners.

== History ==
The founders of Hell Gate (Nick Pinto, Esther Wang, Christopher Robbins, Max Rivlin-Nadler, and Sydney Pereira) began developing the idea for the publication in 2021. Many of them were former coworkers at New York City publications such as the Village Voice, The New York Times, and Gothamist, as well as non-New York publications such as Jezebel and The Intercept. Pinto, Robbins, and Rivlin-Nadler had all faced job instability as journalists due to companies mismanaging resources, lacking funding, and cutting budgets. In January 2022, they pitched the idea of Hell Gate to fifty local journalists, and recruited Pereira and Wang. The team decided that their publication would have a snarky tone like pre-acquisition Gothamist, and that they would approach stories from a human rights-oriented perspective.

Hell Gate launched the website as a test on May 2, 2022, and launched in full two months later. Their advisory board includes Paul Ford and Emily Greenhouse.

== Reporting ==
In 2023, Amsterdam News credited Hell Gate with refuting the New York Police Department's claim that the NYPD was under a "gag order" concerning its Strategic Response Group that prevented them from attending a City Council oversight hearing.

During the 2025 New York City mayoral election, Hell Gate revealed that Andrew Cuomo's campaign had used ChatGPT to write his housing plan (which included what the New York Times called "incoherent babble").

Co-founder Rivlin-Nadler's past experience in TV and radio journalism helped inspire Hell Gate's foray into live broadcasts, beginning with a livestream covering the New York mayoral primary election night on June 24, 2025. Rivlin-Nadler had learned, during a previous job at KPBS, that a smartphone and small mic comprised the physical equipment necessary for broadcast-quality audio and video. Hell Gate has now run two subsequent election night broadcasts, including one in which Pinto livestreamed while biking between two competing campaigns' parties, indicative of Hell Gate's openness to "gonzo journalism."

== Business model ==
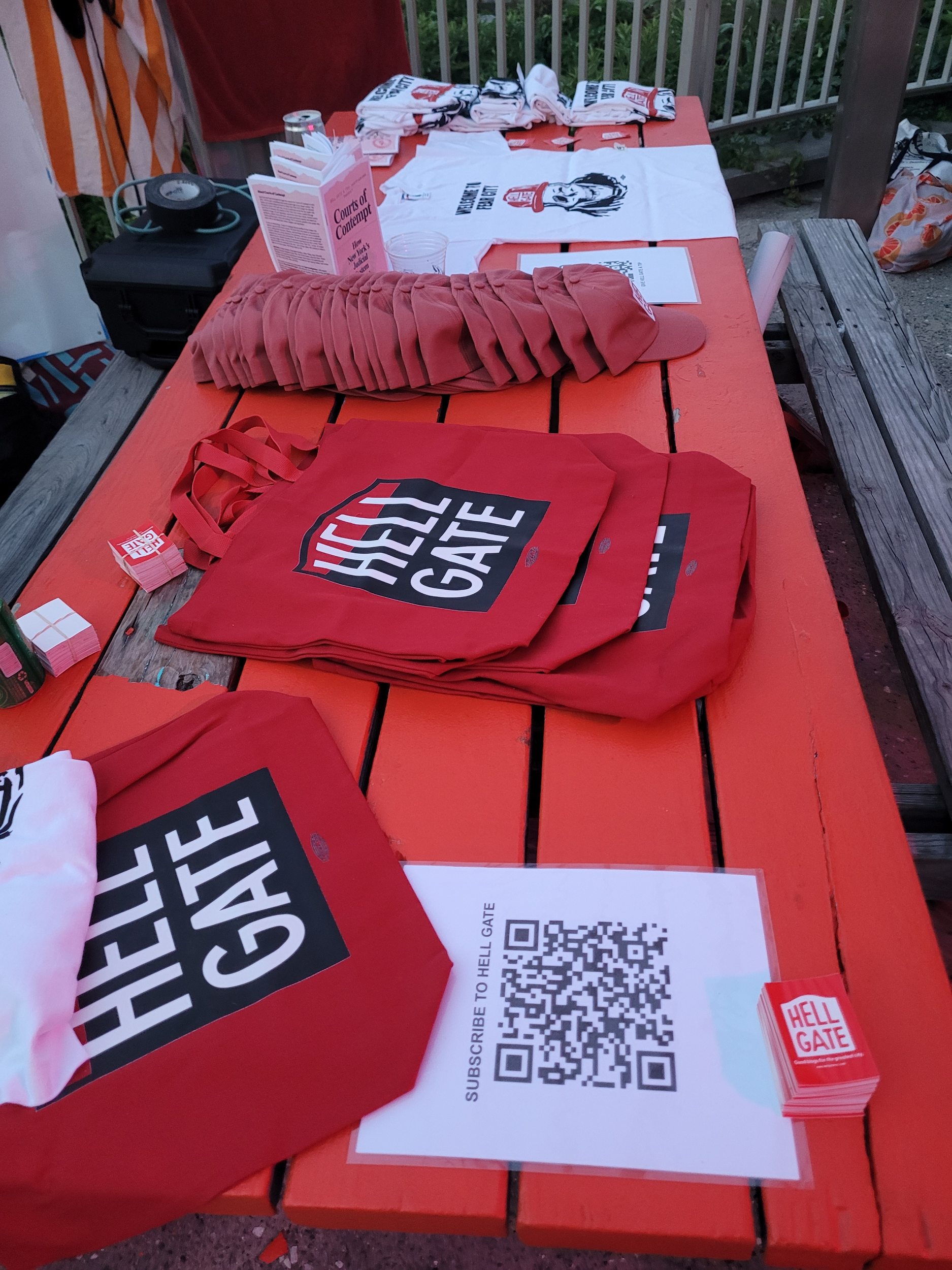
Hell Gate tote bags and other merch for sale in 2026

Hell Gate's initial funding came from two New York-based organizations for the arts: a $25,000 grant from The Harnisch Foundation, and a $50,000 grant from the Vital Projects Fund. A further $300,000 in grants was given between 2023 and 2024.

After a few months initially running as a free newsletter, Hell Gate added a paywall. Subscribers sign up for one of three tiers of subscriptions (paying monthly or annual) to access its paywalled articles. The site also allows non-paying readers to subscribe to free daily and twice-weekly email newsletters, with tens of thousands of subscribers each, and has produced a free-to-listen podcast since February 2023. The founders believed that a subscription-funded business would work, and aimed to be primarily subscriber-funded, partly because of their "profound mistrust of the consistency of philanthropic interest". As of October 2026, the site had 11,000 paid subscribers making $660,000 in the first three quarters, and 64,000 people subscribed to at least one free newsletter.

To keep costs down, at launch, they wrote from home and published online, and used the same provider as Defector Media, another worker-owned cooperative before moving to a location in Bowery.

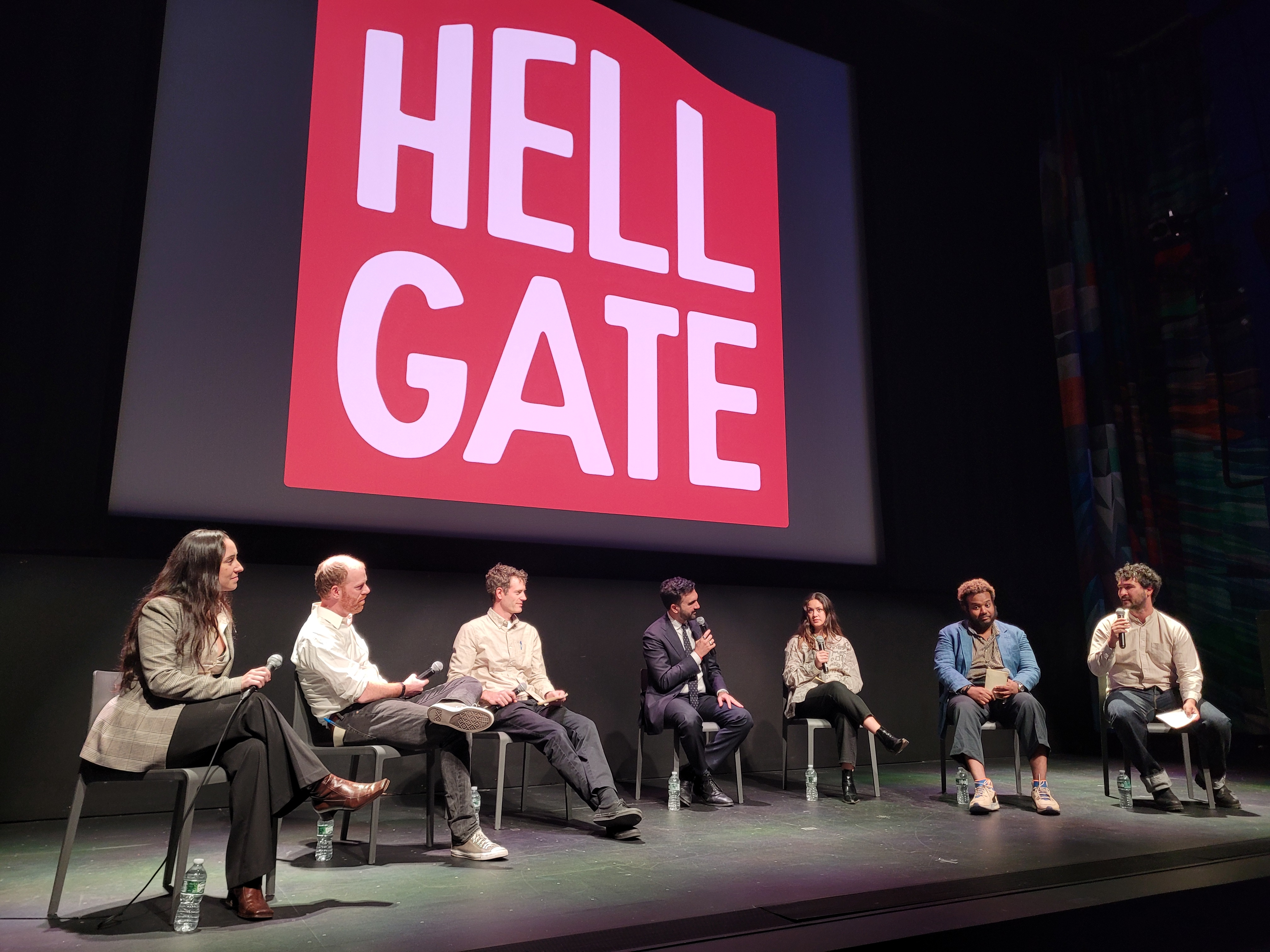
Hell Gate reporters interview Zohran Mamdani on Oct. 24, 2025. From left: Jessy Edwards, Pinto, Robbins, Mamdani, Katie Way, Adlan Jackson, and Rivlin-Nadler.

Hell Gate is a worker-owned cooperative, where the journalists have the job of reporter, editor, and managing the business, with aid from a marketing and external relations manager and an operations and finance manager. Two of the staffers serve primarily as editors, and take a higher salary than those who primarily report. Hell Gate also hires freelancers. As of September 2025, all reporters were paid $75,000 per year, up from $48,000 per year at launch.

As of October 2026, Hell Gate said it expected to earn approximately $1.5 million in revenue in 2026. Advertisements are a minor source of revenue. A third of its revenue comes from donations, down from half in 2024. The majority of Hell Gate's expenses are staff salaries and health insurance premiums (Hell Gate fully funds staffers' health insurance premiums).

== Reception ==
Hell Gate has been identified by several outlets to be part of a resurgence in indie publishing. They have been favorably compared to other worker-owned sites like Aftermath, Defector and 404 Media, and mentioned as part of the legacy of The Village Voice. Hell Gate's subscriber model, podcast, and emphasis on allowing individual staffers' interests and voices to emerge in their reporting facilitates a closer reader relationship than with many publications; "I feel like I’m learning a lot about parasocial relationships," co-owner Jessy Edwards commented in 2026.

The New York Press Club awarded its 2024 annual journalism award in the category "Political Reporting – NYC Metro" to "The Eric Adams Table of Success," a collaboration between Hell Gate and Type Investigations.

== See also ==
- amNewYork Metro
- Gothamist
- The City
- The Indypendent
