= Vanessa de Luca =

American journalist and editor

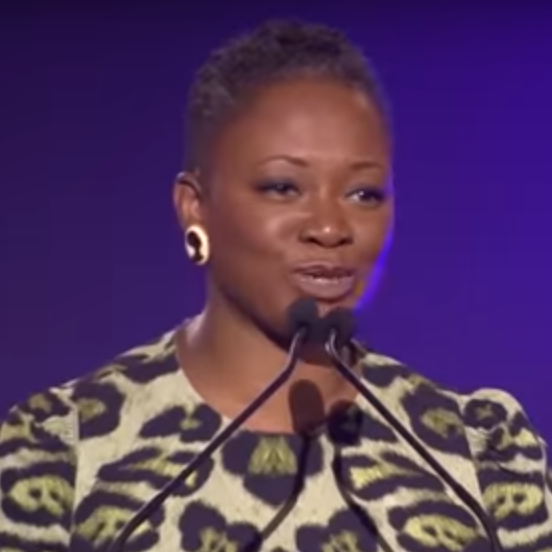
- on Ndani TV in 2017
- Occupation: editor
- Employer: G/O Media
- Known for: Editor in Chief of The Root

Vanessa K. de Luca is an American journalist and magazine editor. She rose to be the lead Editor of Essence magazine and later The Root magazine from 2021 to 2023.

== Life ==
De Luca initial ambition was to work in fashion. She first graduated in English and American Literature from Harvard University. She gained her masters degree in the Science in Magazine Concentration from Columbia University's Graduate School of Journalism. She was thirty when she completed her education in journalism and she went to work for Glamour magazine.

She began working for Essence magazine for African American women as an editor and writer in 2000. She was the executive editor from 2005 to 2008.

In 2015, she was again leading Essence magazine, when she was invited to moderate a "Celebrating Women of the Civil Rights Movement" panel by Michelle Obama during Black History Month at the White House. The panel arranged by her magazine were lawyer Sherrilyn Ifill from the NAACP, the National Action Network's Janaye Ingram, Chanelle Hardy of the Urban League, and mixed education pioneers Charlayne Hunter-Gault and Carlotta Walls LaNier. In the same year she was invited by GTBank in Nigeria and NdaniTV to lead a master class.

In April 2021, Danielle Belton who had become the first editor-in-chief of The Root left to lead HuffPost and it was expected that the in-house applicant Genetta Adams would be her permanent replacement. Jim Spanfeller who led G/O Media appointed de Luca. It was acknowledged that De Luca did not receive a universal welcome, because she had been appointed by Spanfeller. She was also criticised for not establishing her own priorities. De Luca was succeeded by her deputy editor, Tatsha Robertson in June, 2023.
