= KSK =

KSK may refer to:

- Kagyu Shenpen Kunchab, a Tibetan Buddhist temple in Santa Fe, New Mexico
- Kala Shah Kaku, a town in Sheikhupura, Punjab, Pakistan
- Karşıyaka S.K., a sports club from Izmir, Turkey
- Kechara Soup Kitchen, an NGO in Malaysia
- Key Signing Key, in the Domain Name System Security Extensions (DNSSEC)
- Khao Sam Kaeo, a center of metal production and transshipment on the Kra Isthmus (modern Thailand) in the mid-to-late 1st millennium BCE
- Kill Switch...Klick, an American industrial rock band
- Kissing Suzy Kolber, a former American sports blog
- Kreissparkasse, a subcategory of Sparkasse (Germany)
- Kommando Spezialkräfte, part of Germany's special forces
- The Swiss Special Forces Command, Kommando Spezialkräfte in German.
- KSK (grain terminal), a container terminal of the Port of Novorossiysk on the Russian Black Sea coast
- K. S. Krishnan, Indian scientist
- King Star King, a TV series from Adult Swim
