= The Daily Meal =

American food website (founded 2010)

- Website type: Food and drink
- Available in: English
- Founded: 2010
- Owners: Spanfeller Media Group (2010–2016); Tribune Publishing (2016–2022); Static Media (2022–present)
- Founder: Jim Spanfeller
- Website: thedailymeal.com

The Daily Meal is an American food and drinks website. It was launched in October 2010 by Spanfeller Media Group, which was founded by former Forbes.com CEO Jim Spanfeller. It is owned by Static Media since 2022.

== History ==
The Daily Meal was launched in October 2010 by Spanfeller Media Group, a media company led by Jim Spanfeller. Colman Andrews, a co-founder of Saveur and winner of eight James Beard Awards, was appointed as editorial director and Valaer Murray, a former managing editor of Forbes Traveler, became managing editor. It went online in beta in October 2010 and officially launched in January 2011.

In February 2012, it introduced a redesigned homepage and launched The Daily Meal Video Network, which featured recipe guides, restaurant coverage, and interviews with chefs and other culinary figures.

In May 2013, JP Kyrillos, a former publisher of Food & Wine and Travel + Leisure, was named president of The Daily Meal. In July 2013, The Daily Meal launched The World of Wine, a section covering wines, wine regions, grape varieties, food pairings, recipes, and winemakers.

In 2016, The Daily Meal, along with Spanfeller Media Group, was acquired by Tribune Publishing.

In 2022, The Daily Meal was acquired by Static Media.

== Content ==
The Daily Meal publishes recipes, cooking tips, and food news, along with coverage of restaurants, grocery chains, and fast food. It maintained nine channels (Cook, Eat/Dine, Drink, Travel, Entertain, Best Recipes, Holidays, Lists and Community) in addition to city-specific coverage, user-submitted recipes and stories, and recurring lists and rankings such as the 50 Most Powerful People in Food, 25 Best Craft Breweries in America, 101 Best Restaurants in America, and 150 Best Bars in America.

== See also ==
- List of websites about food and drink
