= Drew Magary =

American journalist

- Born: Andrew Schuyler Magary; October 7, 1976 (age 49); Wahroonga, New South Wales, Australia
- Education: Colby College; University of Michigan
- Occupations: Journalist; humorist; columnist; novelist
- Writing career
- Genres: Science fiction, Humor

Andrew Schuyler Magary (born October 7, 1976) is an American journalist, humor columnist, podcast host, and novelist. He was a correspondent for GQ, has written three novels, and formerly was a long-time columnist for Deadspin. He currently writes for Defector Media and SFGate and is the author of The Night the Lights Went Out: A Memoir of Life with Brain Damage, a memoir chronicling his brain injury and subsequent recovery.

== Early life ==
Andrew Schuyler Magary was born to American parents in Wahroonga, a suburb of Sydney, while his father was working in Australia. He moved with his family to the U.S. at the age of four months and grew up in Minnesota and Connecticut. Both of Magary's siblings are American-born. He attended the University of Michigan before transferring to Colby College in Maine, where he majored in English and participated in the drama club. Early in his career, Magary worked in advertising.

== Career ==
=== Journalism ===
Magary was one of the contributors to the NFL humor website Kissing Suzy Kolber. He later became a contributor to the sports website Deadspin and became the site's columnist, providing commentary and answering reader mail in an irreverent and often profane style, reminiscent of Bill Simmons's mailbag editorial feature. In addition to the main Deadspin site, he also contributed to its culture sub-site The Concourse and humor sub-site Adequate Man. His annual "Why Your Team Sucks" columns were featured on Deadspin and are currently featured on Defector, in which he roasts every NFL franchise and mocks the weaknesses of both the team and its city, including the team he supports, the Minnesota Vikings. He announced his departure from the site via a post on his personal Kinja page on October 31, 2019.

Magary has worked frequently as a correspondent for GQ magazine. In 2013 Magary interviewed Duck Dynasty star Phil Robertson for the magazine and the article became widely covered for several comments made by Robertson, particularly concerning homosexuality. He has also written articles for NBC, Maxim, Rolling Stone, Comedy Central, New York, ESPN, Yahoo!, Playboy, The Atlantic, and Penthouse.

=== Chopped ===
In 2012, Magary applied to appear on an amateurs episode of the cooking competition show Chopped. He posted the answers to the application's questions in an installment of his humor column on Deadspin.

In April 2015, Magary appeared on the ninth episode of Chopped's 22nd season, which featured other amateur home cooks, and won the episode's $10,000 prize. After the episode aired, his Deadspin colleague and former NFL player Chris Kluwe posted a satirical review of the episode.

=== Health issue and accident ===
In December 2018, Magary suffered a health crisis, compounded by an accidental fall. He said later: "Nearly five months ago, I suffered a severe brain hemorrhage while I was just standing around at a work party. When I collapsed I fractured my skull. That fracture tore through the inner ear on the right side of my head, rendering it inoperable for good." On May 16, 2019, Magary authored an editorial which laid out the details of his accident and his subsequent recovery. On October 12, 2021, he published a memoir, The Night the Lights Went Out: A Memoir of Life after Brain Damage, about his experience with the injury and recovery.

=== Resignation from Deadspin ===
On October 31, 2019, Magary announced his resignation from Deadspin. Since the purchase of Deadspin in April 2019, editorial and journalistic staff had complained about mismanagement, which culminated in the departure of the entire editorial and journalistic staff during October and November 2019.

=== Post-Deadspin ===
From August 2019 to September 2020, Magary wrote about politics and culture for Gen, a Medium publication. Since April 2020, Magary has been a columnist at SF Gate, a digital sister-site of the San Francisco Chronicle.

Magary and other former Deadspin writers formed Defector Media in 2020. Through Defector, Magary co-hosts a podcast, The Distraction with David Roth.

== Bibliography ==
=== Fiction ===
- The Postmortal & The End Specialist (2011), science fiction novel, nominated for a Philip K. Dick Award and an Arthur C. Clarke Award
- The Hike (2016), fantasy novel
- Point B (2020), fantasy/humor novel

=== Non-fiction ===
- Men with Balls: The Professional Athlete's Handbook (2008), sports humor book
- Someone Could Get Hurt: A Memoir of Twenty-First-Century Parenthood (2013), non-fiction memoir
- The Night the Lights Went Out: A Memoir of Life after Brain Damage (2021), non-fiction memoir
