= Defector Media =

Sports-related blog and media company

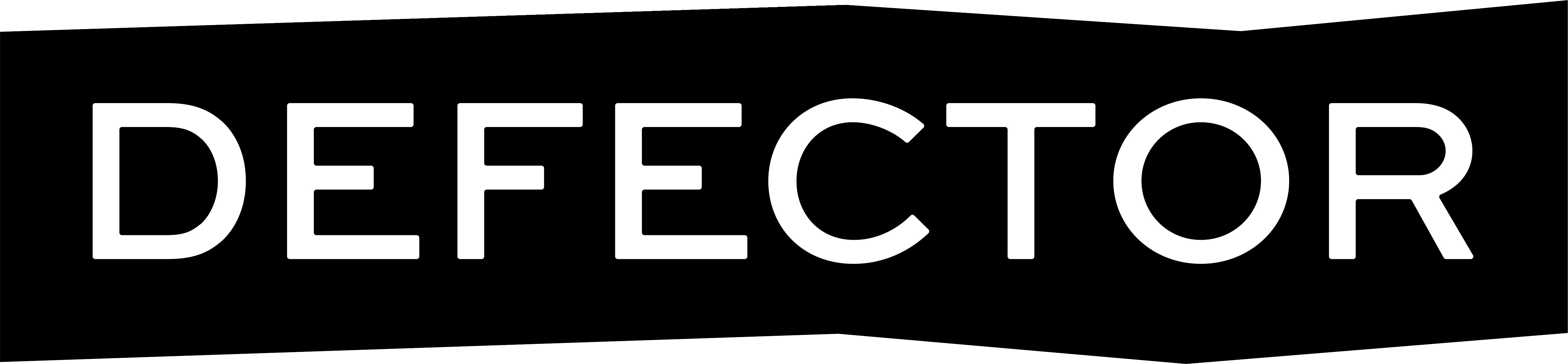
- Type: Sports, social commentary
- Founded: September 2020
- Headquarters: Manhattan, New York, U.S.
- Key people: Tom Ley (editor-in-chief), Jasper Wang (business side)
- Website: defector.com

Defector Media is an American subscription-based sports and culture blog and media company founded in September 2020 and based in Manhattan. The Defector blog is primarily written by former employees of the Deadspin sports blog.

== History ==
In October and November 2019, all writers at Deadspin quit en masse following an edict from the blog's owner, G/O Media, to "stick to sports" and the firing of editor-in-chief Barry Petchesky. On January 31, 2020, Tom Ley and several other former writers established an interim site that which operated over Super Bowl LIV weekend. The site reopened for the week of April 20, sponsored by a cannabis oil company.

In July 2020, they announced their new subscription-based sports website, Defector. Ley is the editor-in-chief. The company had 19 employees, each of whom owned approximately 5% of the company.

== Business model ==
Defector relies on a subscription model for revenue. In an interview with Slate, co-founder Maitreyi Anantharaman, while discussing how the writers worked out the logistics of starting the site, said, "[e]veryone had the same priorities, which were editorial independence and worker stake, and we did come to a consensus that this model was the best way to do this thing." Anantharaman also mentioned that the site was "interested in sustainable growth" and did not "need a million subscribers or anything to be successful".

Subscriptions are mostly two-tiered, at $79 and $119 a year, with the higher-cost subscription enabling commenting on articles, access to staff Q&As, and subscription to the blog's newsletter. A third tongue-in-cheek subscription tier at $1,000 per year offers the chance to guest host a Defector podcast, MS Paint artwork by a blog writer, and an "annual video from a writer wishing you a happy birthday, the day after your birthday". Alex Shephard writing for The New Republic said "Defector has slipped between two subscription-based trends, neither the atomized Substack model nor the scale model being deployed by traditional newsrooms like The New York Times, The Washington Post, and The Atlantic." Shephard also praised the site for being "refreshingly, both very much like the old Deadspin and very much not like the rest of the internet."

As a way of enticing readers to subscribe, the site offers multiple incentives, from the ability to comment on articles to personalized birthday videos by staff. In July 2020, it was reported that Defector had reached over 10,000 subscriptions on launch day and by September had almost reached 30k subscriptions. By the end of 2020, that number had reached over 34,000. As of October 2024, Defector has around 40,000 paid subscribers.

The business side of the site is run by former Deadspin reader Jasper Wang, who worked for Bain & Company. Both Wang and editor-in-chief Tom Ley can be removed from their positions at any time with a two-thirds vote of Defector staff.

Defector has been compared to other worker-owned journalism companies like Hell Gate NYC and 404 Media.

== Podcasts ==
Drew Magary and David Roth debuted a podcast, The Distraction, on August 13, 2020. In January 2023, Multitude Productions became the podcast's producer, replacing Stitcher.

In December 2021, Defector launched the Namedropping podcast, hosted by Giri Nathan and Samer Kalaf. The show uses names as an entry point to discuss cultural topics such as religion, family, gender, and other forms of identity.

By the end of 2021, Defector was making $3.2 million in revenue and had 36,000 subscribers.

In January 2022, Defector premiered the Normal Gossip podcast, hosted by staff writer Kelsey McKinney and produced by Alex Sujong Laughlin. Each episode features McKinney telling an anonymized gossip story to a guest. In 2023, the show became a member of the Radiotopia podcast network. According to Defector's 2023 annual report, approximately a tenth of subscriptions to the site come from Normal Gossip listeners. In December 2024, McKinney and Sujong Laughlin left the podcast, replaced by Defector staff writer Rachelle Hampton as host and Se'era Spragley-Ricks as lead producer.

In 2024, Defector's revenue had increased to $4.6 million a year, with a peak of 42,500 subscribers.

In July 2025, Defector acquired Nothing But Respect, a basketball podcast hosted by Patrick Redford and Harry Krinsky.
