= Carlotta Walls LaNier =

American activist (born 1942)

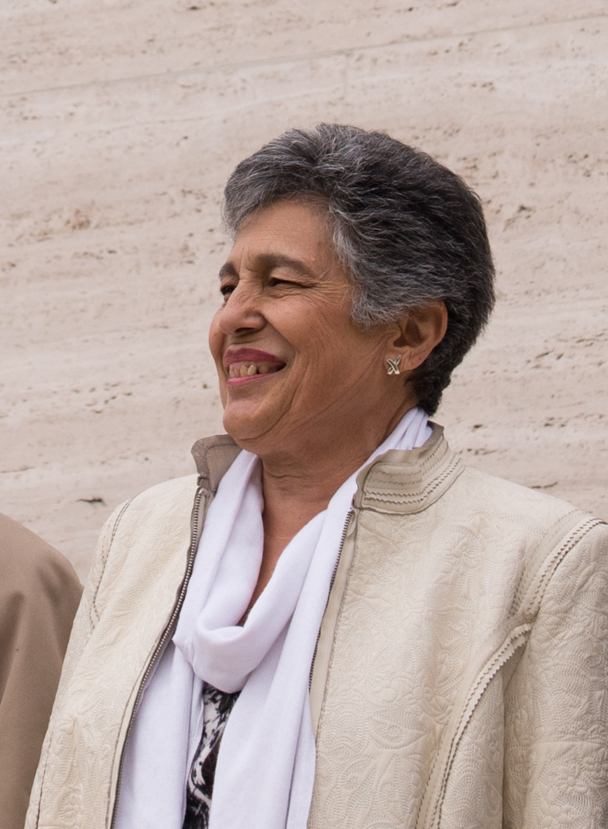
- Walls LaNier in 2018
- Born: Carlotta Walls; December 18, 1942 (age 83); Little Rock, Arkansas, U.S.
- Known for: The youngest of the Little Rock Nine
- Awards: Spingarn Medal, Congressional Gold Medal, Pierre Marquette Award

Carlotta Walls LaNier (née Walls; born December 18, 1942) is the youngest of the Little Rock Nine, a group of African-American students who, in 1957, were the first black students ever to attend classes at Little Rock Central High School in Little Rock, Arkansas, United States. She was the first black female to graduate from Central High School. In 1999, LaNier and the rest of the Little Rock Nine were awarded the Congressional Gold Medal by President Bill Clinton. LaNier was inducted into the Colorado Women's Hall of Fame in 2004 and the National Women's Hall of Fame in 2015.

== Early and personal life ==
Carlotta Walls LaNier was born on December 18, 1942, in Little Rock, Arkansas to Juanita and Cartelyou Walls. Cartelyou was a brick mason, while Juanita was a secretary in the Office of Public Housing. LaNier had two younger sisters. Her parents bought their own home after her father returned from World War II in 1945. They bought a house for $3,000 that belonged to her great grandfather and was very close to the imposing Central High School.

LaNier first attended Dunbar Junior High School, a segregated school in Little Rock. However, after graduating, she volunteered to be one of the first African-Americans to attend Central High School.

She said she was inspired by Rosa Parks when she refused to give up her seat in the 1955 Montgomery bus boycott. LaNier learned about the chance to go to Central High School by her homeroom teacher at her junior high. Her teacher asked if anyone was interested in going to Central, and LaNier popped out of her seat and registered to go to the new school. Her parents didn’t know she had been enrolled until the registration card showed up in the mail that July.

On February 9, 1960, LaNier's home was bombed. Two sticks of dynamite were placed on her home. The explosion removed bricks, destroyed three windows, and could be heard from two miles away. Her father was away, but LaNier was home alongside her mother and sisters. Nobody was harmed in the bombing, but it was the first bombing directed at one of the students. Despite the bombing, LaNier continued to attend the school.

=== Desegregation ===
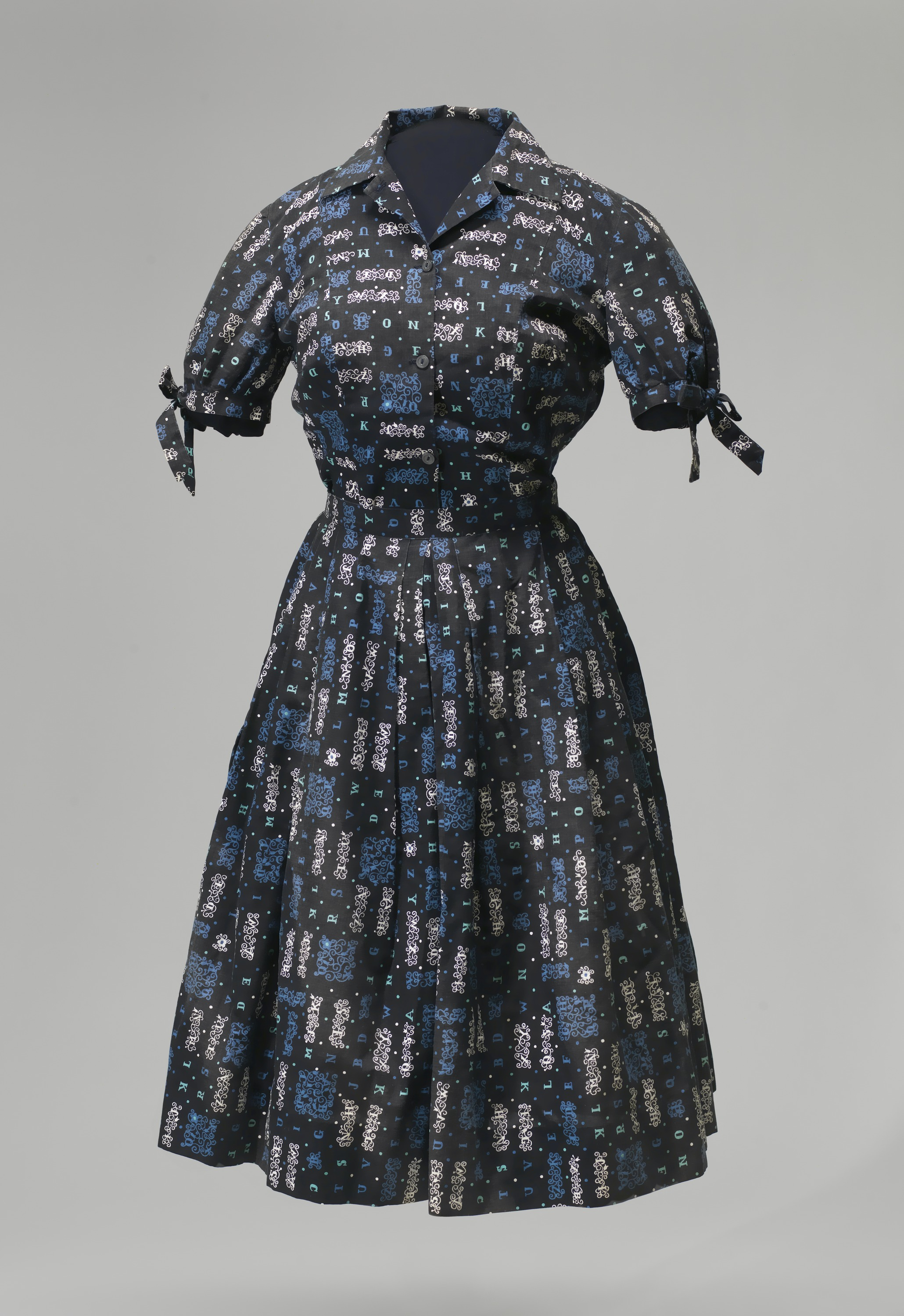
Outfit worn by Carlotta Walls to Little Rock Central High School

On September 9, 1957, nine African-American students entered the formerly segregated Little Rock Central High School as the school's first black students, including LaNier. White teenage girls chanted "Two, four, six, eight! We don't want to integrate!" The Arkansas National Guard, under orders from the governor, and an angry mob of about 400 surrounded the school and prevented them from going in. On September 23, 1957, a mob of about 1000 people surrounded the school again as the students attempted to enter. The following day, President Dwight D. Eisenhower took control of the Arkansas National Guard from the governor and sent soldiers to accompany the students to school for protection. Soldiers were deployed at the school for the entirety of the school year, although they were unable to prevent incidents of violence against the group inside.

Despite the constant torment from the white students, LaNier never cried or retaliated. She remained strong through all the times she was called names, spat on, and knocked over. She knew she had to be there as an example student so that all schools could eventually be desegregated. During her time there, LaNier was an honor roll student.

In 1958, LaNier and the rest of the Little Rock Nine were awarded the Spingarn Medal by the National Association for the Advancement of Colored People (NAACP), as was Daisy Bates. During 1958-59 school year the school closed to prevent in being de-segregated. This was supported by the governor and a popular vote, but was it was re-opened. LaNier had occupied her time taking correspondence courses so she was able to return to achieve her high school diploma in 1960.

She married Ira (Ike) LaNier in 1968 with whom she had two children, Whitney and Brooke. She has two grandchildren, a granddaughter and a grandson. She later lived in Englewood, Colorado.

== College and career ==
Following her graduation from Central High in 1960, LaNier attended Michigan State University for two years. However, her father was unable to find a job because of the crisis surrounding his daughter, and they moved to Denver, Colorado. LaNier graduated from Colorado State College (now the University of Northern Colorado) and began working at the YWCA as a program administrator for teens. In 1977, she founded LaNier and Company, a real estate brokerage company.

For over 30 years, LaNier worked as a real estate broker. She worked with Brokers Guild-Cherry Creek Ltd., and formerly with Prudential Colorado Real Estate. She was a member of Metrolist, Inc.

In 2015 Vanessa de Luca, the editor of Essence magazine, was invited to moderate a "Celebrating Women of the Civil Rights Movement" panel by Michelle Obama during Black History Month at the White House. LaNier was a member of the panel arranged by Essence magazine. The others were lawyer Sherrilyn Ifill from the NAACP, the National Action Network's Janaye Ingram, Chanelle Hardy of the Urban League and Charlayne Hunter-Gault.

LaNier has been a member of the Colorado Aids Project, Jack and Jill of America, The Urban League, and the NAACP. She was also the president of the Little Rock Nine Foundation, an organization dedicated to ensuring equal access to education for African American students.

== Writings ==
- A Mighty Long Way: My Journey to Justice at Little Rock Central High School. With Lisa Frazier Page. OneWorld/Ballantine, 2009, ISBN 034551100X.
