= Ollie Stewart =

American journalist (1906–1977)

Ollie Stewart (May 18, 1906 – 1977) was one of many black journalists credentialed by the War Department to report of the war in Africa and Europe during World War II and was the first black journalist to be credentialed by the War Department to cover the European Theater.

== Career ==
Reporting from overseas, he wrote hundreds of personal accounts of his observations of the war through the eyes of the black soldier. He wrote for the Baltimore Afro-American, the largest black newspaper in America. After the war ended he remained in Paris, France where he continued to write and submit articles that were printed in the United States to his death in 1977. He was largely unknown but more recently scholars and authors are bringing his contributions to light.

Stewart was born on May 18, 1906, in Gibsland, Louisiana. He graduated in 1930 from what is now Tennessee State University in Nashville, Tennessee, and soon began submitting freelance articles to such publications as Southern Magazine, the Southern Workman, and Opportunity magazine. Stewart obtained notoriety when his article about Father Divine, a Black spiritual leader, appeared in Scribner's Commentator and Reader's Digest. He was paid $650 for "Harlem's God in his Heaven," a huge sum in 1940 (Scope note, Moorland-Spingarn Research Center). He joined the Afro-American as a correspondent in New York, and sometime before June 1940, he became sports editor.

Stewart's first experience as a foreign correspondent came when the Afro-American sent him to do a special series on people of color in South America in 1941. A year later the newspaper sent him as a war correspondent to Europe and North Africa, from where he sent regular dispatches covering the African, French, Italian, and German sectors of the war. The reports were colorful and detailed, and in many instances they were the only means for families to get information about their loved ones who were deployed to undisclosed locations.

In June 1942, he traveled to London and covered the war until he boarded a British merchant ship in November 1942 headed to Oran, Algeria that carried British and American replacement troops for the war in Africa. Many other journalists were aboard the same ship such as Ernie Pyle. Pyle wrote in his book that "Ollie Stewart was the only American Negro correspondent then accredited to the European theater. He was well-educated, conducted himself well, and had traveled quite a bit in foreign countries. We all grew to like him very much on the trip. He lived in one of the two cabins with us, ate with us, played handball on deck with the officers, everybody was friendly to him, and there was no 'problem'."

He covered the war in North Africa that was fought to remove "Desert Fox" Rommel while searching for the black fighting soldier for his regular reports. He covered the Tuskegee Airmen after they reported to Africa during the campaign to Sicily and Italy.

In January 1943, he covered the Casablanca Conference where he met Franklin Roosevelt and Winston Churchill. During his trip to Casablanca he interviewed Josephine Baker, a well known black entertainer from St. Louis, Missouri and who became a French citizen. She said this, he reported with a "gay smile and a French accent ... her face uplifted toward the eternal snows of the nearby Atlas peaks."

He followed the troops to Sicily and then to Italy. He found Sicily to be beautiful but was struck by the devastation in Italy. He left Italy in December 1943 and returned to the United States briefly and then back to London in May 1944 and went ashore at Omaha Beach during the Invasion of Normandy in June 1944. He traveled with Allied troops to the Liberation of Paris and riding in the same convoy following the entrance of Charles de Gaulle. He remained in Europe through 1946 and met Pope Pius XII being the first black journalist to be received by the Pope.

Stewart returned to the United States and his post at the Afro-American after the war, but because he could not tolerate racism and discrimination, he returned to Europe in April 1949 and made his home in Paris until 1977, when he returned to America and died shortly thereafter.

He became the only African American reporting continually from overseas and maintained a base in Paris for 28 years filing articles and columns for the Baltimore, Washington, D.C., and national editions of the newspaper, and writing freelance pieces for other publications. He had already established himself as a reputable journalist prior to and during the war, but in Paris, he solidified that reputation and became much sought after in social and political circles. Despite his longevity and unique position as an African-American journalist living and writing from abroad, Stewart remains almost invisible in media, journalism and American history. In Paris, Stewart wrote a weekly column titled "Report from Europe" or "Report from Paris" in the Afro-American and occasional articles and short stories for the publication and others such as Reader's Digest and True Detective.

Stewart's writings during his post-World War II career at the Afro-American newspapers totaled 478, of which 426 were columns and 52 were article written in the Afro-American, the Baltimore AfroAmerican and the Washington Afro-American.

He remained in Paris as a foreign correspondent the rest of his career and returned to the United States where he died in 1977 in Georgia.

Ollie Stewart's service in the African and European campaigns during World War II served as the inspiration for the fiction novel "A Private War" (ISBN 9781523961153) by Perry Cockerell released in April 2016 where Stewart was portrayed as the character "Oliver Smith."

== Personal life ==
His great-niece is the writer and editor Dodai Stewart.
