= Kelsey McKinney =

American journalist, podcaster, and author

- Born: 1991 or 1992; Flower Mound, Texas
- Education: University of Texas at Austin
- Occupations: Journalist, podcaster, author

Kelsey McKinney (born 1991 or 1992) is an American journalist, podcaster, and author. She is a staff writer at Defector and the founding host of Normal Gossip. She previously wrote for Deadspin and Vox.

== Early life and education ==
McKinney grew up in Flower Mound, Texas. Her father is an Evangelical pastor.

She attended the University of Texas at Austin, earning a bachelor's degree in 2014. While in college, she interned at Reader's Digest and the Harry Ransom Center and began writing freelance stories. She served as an editor for The Daily Texan.

== Career ==
McKinney previously wrote a newsletter, Written Out, about books written by women who had been marginalized in historical narratives.

McKinney was hired at Deadspin in spring 2019. That October, she was one of 19 staffers at the publication who resigned in protest after editor Barry Petchesky was fired over a mandate to "stick to sports." Over the following year, she and her former colleagues discussed the idea of a media company that more effectively centered writers. They proceeded to found the sports and culture site Defector, which is owned collectively as a worker cooperative.

During the COVID-19 pandemic, she felt nostalgic for the experience of gossiping with friends in person and tweeted about the idea of hosting a gossip-centric podcast, which would become Normal Gossip. She began working on the first season of the show with producer Alex Sujong Laughlin in September 2021, and it premiered five months later to critical and popular acclaim. Both McKinney and Laughlin left Normal Gossip in December 2024, although they retained their positions at Defector.

=== Books ===
McKinney's 2021 debut novel, God Spare the Girls, follows two daughters of a Texas megachurch pastor who is revealed to have had an affair.

Her first essay collection, You Didn’t Hear This From Me, was released in February 2025 by Grand Central Publishing.

== Personal life ==
McKinney lives in the Queen Village neighborhood of Philadelphia with her husband and her dog, Georgia. She was raised Evangelical, but no longer considers herself a believer in Christianity.
