= Jasmyn Lawson =

American digital media executive (born 1991)

Jasmyn Lawson (born September 1991) is an American digital media executive. Lawson has been manager of original series at Netflix since 2020. She previously worked for the streamer's Strong Black Lead initiative, and was a culture editor at Giphy.

== Early life and education ==
Lawson was raised in Jackson, Michigan. She received her bachelor's degree from Spelman College, where she was a drama major and a film studies minor. During college she held an internship at Cartoon Network. Lawson also blogged regularly and at 21 wrote a post expressing her desire to work at Netflix.

== Career ==
Lawson's first position out of college was as a page at NBC. After her program term ended she worked at social media marketing agency Glow.

She left Glow in 2016 to work as a culture editor at Giphy. She developed GIFs relevant to Black culture and used Twitter to inform which ones to create. Maintaining a Twitter presence is central to Lawson's work and she credits Black Twitter with driving cultural trends.

Lawson was scouted by Netflix in 2018 to join their fledgling Strong Black Lead initiative. She was hired as the editorial and brand manager for the project and oversaw social media communications. Lawson produced the podcasts Strong Black Legends and Strong Black Laughs. She noticed conversations Twitter users had about the desire to stream Black sitcoms from the late 1990s and early 2000s. That influenced her to advocate for Netflix to pick up licensing rights for programs such as Sister, Sister and Moesha. The shows had high viewership ratings after they debuted on Netflix.

In November 2020 Lawson was promoted to the executive level as manager of original series including Never Have I Ever and Dear White People. She also oversees the development of new comedy shows.

== Personal life ==
Lawson resides in Los Angeles.

== Accolades ==
- 2020 – The Root 100, Entertainment, The Root
- 2021 – 30 under 30, Hollywood & Entertainment, Forbes
