= Kissing Suzy Kolber =

NFL-related humor blog

- Website type: Blog
- Available in: English
- Owner: Uproxx.com
- Creator: Big Daddy Drew
- Website: http://www.kissingsuzykolber.com/
- Registration: No
- Launched: June 28, 2006
- Current status: Inactive

Kissing Suzy Kolber was an NFL-related humor blog run by a group of unsanctioned sports bloggers. The site began in June 2006 when the founders came together as like-minded commenters from the sports blog Deadspin. In 2006, 2007, and 2008, the site won the Weblog Award for Best Sports Blog.

== Writers ==
Writer Name	Real Name
Big Daddy Drew (Inactive)	Drew Magary
Unsilent Majority	Jack Kogod
Captain Caveman	Matt Ufford
Christmas Ape	Michael Tunison
Monday Morning Punter (Left on July 31, 2011)	Josh Zerkle
Flubby	J. Reed (Anonymous Lawyer)
Sarah Sprague (Non-founder)	Sarah Sprague
The Mighty MJD (Non-founder)	Unknown
Mayor Burnsy (Non-founder)	Ashley Burns
Danger Guerrero (Non-founder)	Brian Grubb
Bobby Big Wheel (Non-Founder)	Robert Wheel
PFT Commenter (Non-Founder)	Eric Sollenberger
Footsteps Falco (Legend)	Falco
RobotsFightingDinosaurs (Non-Founder)	Sam Greszes
Old James (Non-Founder)	Unknown
David Rappoccio (Non-Founder)	
StuScott Booyahs (Non-Founder)	Unknown

KSK took its name from an incident during a December 20, 2003, game broadcast between the New York Jets and the New England Patriots, in which former Jets quarterback Joe Namath drunkenly made advances on ESPN sideline reporter Suzy Kolber.

The site gained some notoriety soon after its founding when pictures of the daughter of Sports Illustrated columnist Peter King appeared on the site after the writers mock-threatened King with posting them unless King stopped tirelessly discussing his family in his columns. After some criticism, the pictures were soon taken down. The episode was recounted in Will Leitch's book, God Save The Fan. The site runs a weekly analysis of King's column in a style similar to Fire Joe Morgan.

The content can be considered high-minded vulgarity. Obscure cultural references are often mixed with imagined obscene scenarios and dialog. The posts on the site, though connected to current events in the league, often satirize the events, fans or the media.

== Characters ==
Various NFL players or personalities appear on the site as recurring fictionalized characters. On April 14, 2008, Michael Tunison revealed his identity as a writer for The Washington Post on the blog. He was then fired by the Post for, in Tunison's words, "bringing discredit to the paper."

== Closure ==
On July 31, 2015, Tunison, by then KSK's editor-in-chief, published the final piece he would write for the website, entitled "Smell Ya Later Forever, KSK". In this op-ed, he lamented that he was "burned out" from being the site's only full-time employee, having to compete with much larger sports news websites, and from the lack of editorial control he felt from Uproxx, the company which bought the website in 2011. He remarked, most notably, about a post from May 2015 that made fun of Budweiser's "#UpForWhatever" marketing campaign, which he was ordered to remove by senior management due to the potential of upsetting one of the website's sponsors. Despite this, however, they allowed another post on the site to remain active, which saw British comedian John Oliver making fun of exactly the same campaign. Most of the website's other writers chose to leave with Tunison, though David Rappoccio remained behind to continue his popular drawings of modified NFL logos. All sports content from August 2015 forward is now published under the umbrella of Uproxx Sports as a whole.

== Door Flies Open ==
Since August 2015, Kissing Suzy Kolber has seen its mandate succeeded by Door Flies Open, a website launched by many of the former commenters of KSK articles. [DFO] has continued on the tradition of liveblogging football games during the season, storytelling using a mix of real-life and fantasy characters, food, puzzles, and more high-minded vulgarity. The site takes its name from a common stage cue used in KSK writer Drew Magary's posts involving Rex Ryan and the 2009-2012 New York Jets, typically when the coach bursts into the locker room with news & the line "How the fuck you doin', boys?".
