= The Root (magazine) =

African-American online magazine

- Website type: Online magazine
- Available in: English
- Owner: Watering Hole Media
- Creators: Henry Louis Gates Jr. Donald E. Graham
- Editor: Tatsha Robertson
- Website: theroot.com
- Commercial: Yes
- Launched: January 28, 2008; 18 years ago

The Root is an African American–oriented online magazine launched on January 28, 2008 by Henry Louis Gates Jr. and Donald E. Graham. In October 2025, it was acquired by Watering Hole Media.

== History ==
The Root was launched on January 28, 2008, by Henry Louis Gates Jr. and Donald E. Graham, under the ownership of The Washington Post Company (now Graham Holdings). When its online subsidiary, The Slate Group, was created that June, The Root was placed under this new subsidiary.

Sold to Univision Communications in 2015, it was subsequently re-launched under the Kinja platform used by other websites under Gizmodo Media Group (the former Gawker Media websites).

In July 2017, the blog Very Smart Brothas, co-founded by Damon Young and Panama Jackson, became a vertical of The Root.

In April 2019, The Root became part of the newly-created G/O Media, following the purchase of Gizmodo Media Group from Univision by Great Hill Partners.

Danielle Belton was editor-in-chief at The Root between 2017 and 2021, when she was appointed editor of HuffPost. On April 14, 2021, it was announced that Belton was succeeded by Vanessa De Luca as editor-in-chief. De Luca in turn was succeeded by Tatsha Robertson on June 22, 2023.

Since April 2021, The Root has seen substantial staff turnover, with 15 out of the 16 full-time staffers resigning following internal tensions, with former staff member Michael Harriot saying that, "as a staff, we came to the conclusion that, basically, The Root is over." These departures were part of a wider conflict between G/O Media and its other outlets that saw staff also resigning across these outlets. A representative issued a statement addressing the staff turnover. “The Root enjoys full editorial independence, and is firmly committed to continuing its mission of providing unflinching news commentary and analysis with its own unique point of view.”

With the sale of Kotaku in July 2025, The Root stood as the last remaining outlet in the G/O Media portfolio, the company having individually sold all of its outlets since 2023. Ashley Allison's company Watering Hole Media acquired The Root in October 2025; Allison is a Democratic political strategist and CNN commentator.

== The Root 100 ==
The Root 100 is the magazine's annual "list of the 100 most important black influencers between the ages of 25 and 45." This list has been published since 2011, when it began ranking honorees using an influence score that resulted from a mathematical formula developed by scholar Omar Wasow. Readers of The Root are allowed to nominate those who they feel are deserving of being on this list. The list has had a wide variety of people from celebrities such as Donald Glover, writers like Roxane Gay, and athletes. Other influential people in the black community who are not as well known, such as activists, are encouraged to be added to the list as well.

A Select list of Root 100 honorees:

- 2011 - Ben Jealous, Kasim Reed, Michelle Alexander, Mellody Hobson
- 2012 -
- 2013 - Stephen K. Benjamin, Van Jones, Serena Williams, Melissa Harris-Perry
- 2014 - Ta-Nehisi Coates, Shonda Rhimes, Roxane Gay, Benjamin Crump
- 2015 -
- 2016 -
- 2017 -
- 2018 -
- 2019 -
- 2020 - Cori Bush, Jamaal Bowman, Jasmyn Lawson, Kehinde Wiley
- 2021 - Nikole Hannah -Jones, Allyson Felix, Chadwick Boseman, Marc Lamont Hill
- 2022 - Stacey Abrams, Lizzo, Trevor Noah, LeVar Burton
- 2023 - Hakeem Jeffries, Uche Blackstock, Ava DuVernay, Colman Domingo
- 2024 - Alvin Bragg, Kamala Harris, Jeffrey Wright, Da'Vine Joy Randolph
- 2025 - Don Lemon, Jasmine Crockett, Joy Reid, Brandon Scott
- 2026 - Victor Glover, Angie Nixon, Timnit Gebru, Spike Lee
