= Spanfeller Media Group =

Digital media company based in New York

Spanfeller Media Group (SMG)
- Industry: Publishing
- Founded: 1 January 2010
- Headquarters: New York City
- Key people: Jim Spanfeller
- Parent: Tribune Publishing

Spanfeller Media Group (SMG), a subsidiary of publishing company Tribune Publishing, is a digital media company based in New York City. It was founded in 2010 by Jim Spanfeller, after leading the digital strategy at Forbes.com. Spanfeller Media Group operates two media sites as subject-specific digital destinations, The Daily Meal, dedicated to food and drink, and The Active Times, centered on outdoor sports and an active lifestyle.

== History ==
Spanfeller Media Group (SMG) was founded in June 2010 by Jim Spanfeller. The concept of SMG was to highlight the content aspect of media and commission its websites to design and produce content by, for and about the web. The websites focus on core mass vertical content areas that do not presently have major dominating content sites.

== Products ==
- The Daily Meal, launched in January 2011
- The Active Times, launched in June 2012

== Financial ==
Starting in 2010, SEC fillings show that SMG raised $13,769,700 in funding before being sold to Tribune Publishing.

Tribune Publishing (known as Tronc at time), noted in their Form 10-K for the fiscal year of 2017 that they had "completed acquisitions totaling $7.6 million of Spanfeller Media Group (SMG)".

Funding Received
Amount	Filing Date
$1,665,000	2010-10-14
$5,908,934	2011-08-04
$4,895,767	2012-10-18
$1,000,000	2015-03-05
$299,999	2016-06-14

== Governance ==
SMG’s executive team comprises Jim Spanfeller, president and CEO; Jeff Bauer, chief product officer; Jacqueline Stone, senior vice president, marketing; Philip Barber, chief technology officer; Sharon Jautz, vice president, human resources. Spanfeller previously served as the president and CEO of Forbes.com, serving on the advisory boards of several early-stage Web start-ups. He has received numerous industry accolades such as the first ever Founders Award from the Interactive Advertising Bureau (IAB) for lifetime achievement. Currently, Spanfeller is secretary of the Online Publisher’s Association (OPA) and is a chairman emeritus of the IAB.
