= Normal Gossip =

Podcast launched in 2022

- Genre: Conversation
- Country of origin: United States
- Language: English

Creative team
- Created by: Kelsey McKinney; Alex Sujong Laughlin

Cast and voices
- Hosted by: Kelsey McKinney (seasons 1–7); Rachelle Hampton (season 7–)

Production
- Production: Defector Media; Radiotopia (since 2023)
- Length: ~1 hour

Publication
- No. of seasons: 9
- Original release: January 5, 2022

Normal Gossip is a podcast produced by Defector Media and Radiotopia. Created by Kelsey McKinney and Alex Sujong Laughlin and hosted since 2024 by Rachelle Hampton, the program features listener-contributed gossip stories that are anonymized and narrated alongside a guest, usually a comedian or journalist.

Named one of the best podcasts of 2022 by Vulture, Time, The Atlantic and Here & Now, Normal Gossip has released nine seasons and garnered more than 10 million listens.

== History ==
McKinney, a writer and cofounder of Defector, was inspired to create the podcast during the COVID-19 pandemic, when she missed "the fizzy thrill of overhearing a good story at a bar." The pitch was not picked up by any major podcast platforms, so Defector hired Laughlin to produce the show as a freelancer.

The show launched in early 2022, quickly attracting thousands of listeners per episode. In April 2023, it joined Radiotopia, a network of indie podcasts administered by PRX. In summer 2023, the show produced a series of live events across the United States.

== Format ==
Episodes originate with stories of interpersonal conflict submitted by fans, referred to as the show's "friend of a friend"; Laughlin has said she prefers they be contributed by a bystander rather than one of the subjects. The stories lean light-hearted rather than serious, addressing topics such as romance, friendship, roommates, neighbors and colleagues. Producers vet the submissions for basic fairness and accuracy, then remove identifying details such as locations and organizations.

The host begins episodes by interviewing guests about their relationship to gossip, then tells them a story, soliciting reactions as the narrative progresses. Guests are encouraged to be judgmental and joke about the people involved.

McKinney hosted Normal Gossip for its first seven seasons; she announced during the seventh season's finale that she and Laughlin were both leaving the show with the intent to keep it fresh and move on to other projects. (Both retained their staff positions at Defector.) The new production team consisted of host Rachelle Hampton and producer Se’era Spragley Ricks, both formerly of the Slate internet culture podcast ICYMI.

== Seasons ==
Season	Episodes	Originally aired	
Season	Episodes	First aired	Last aired
1	10	January 5, 2022	May 3, 2022
2	10	May 17, 2022	August 23, 2022
3	8	September 6, 2022	October 25, 2022
4	10	April 4, 2023	June 6, 2023
5	10	October 18, 2023	December 19, 2023
6	10	April 17, 2024	June 19, 2024
7	10	October 9, 2024	December 10, 2024
8	10	April 9, 2025	June 11, 2025
9	10	November 12, 2025	January 28, 2026
