= Danielle Belton =

American journalist

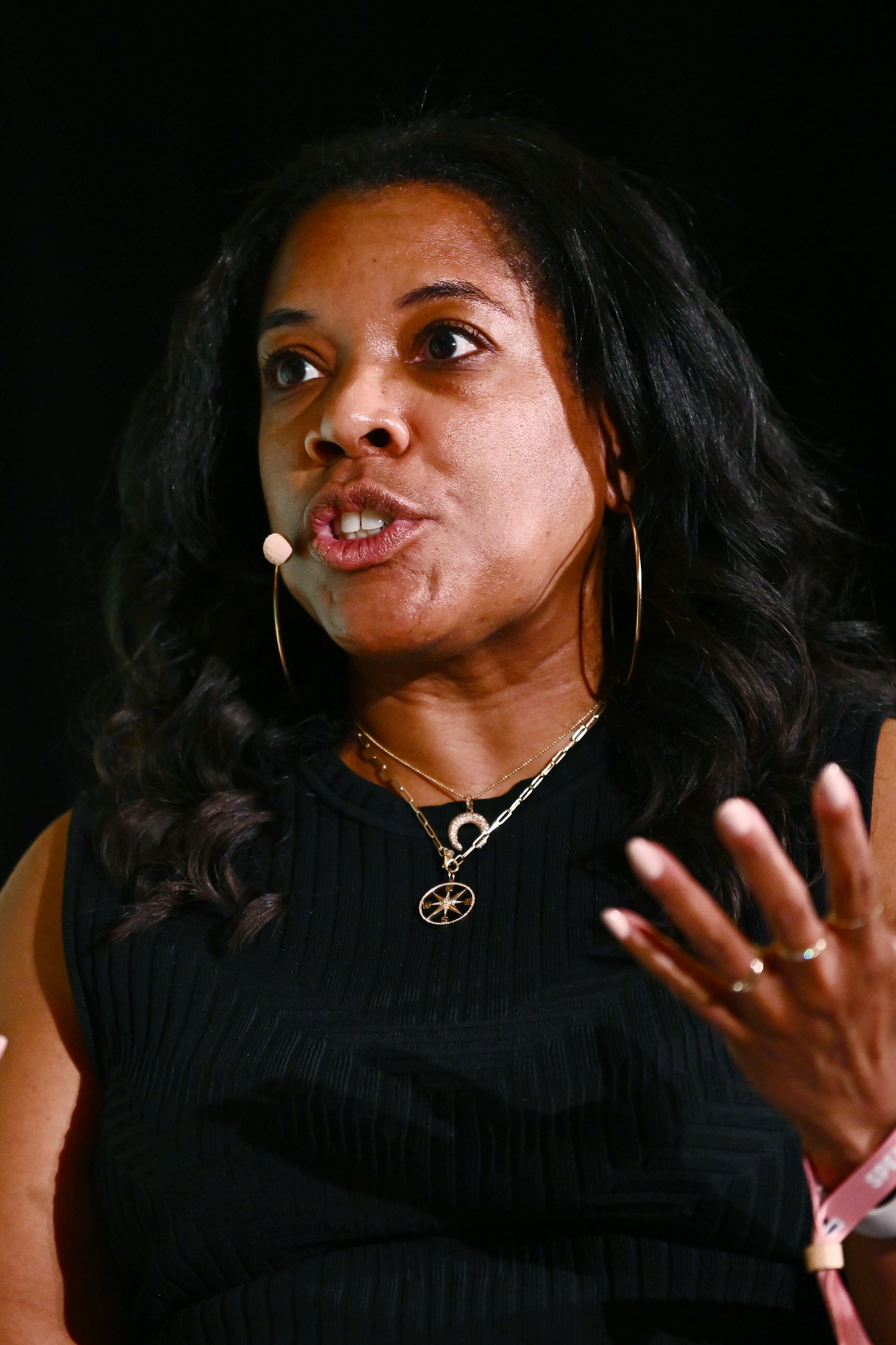
- Belton in 2024
- Born: 1977 or 1978 (age 48–49)
- Occupation: Editor of HuffPost

Danielle Belton (born c.1977) is an American journalist who is the editor-in-chief of HuffPost. She worked with local and national publications. She joined The Root in 2015. She became its youngest managing editor and its first editor-in-chief. In 2021 she became the editor of HuffPost.

== Early life and education ==
Belton grew up in Black Jack and Florissant, Missouri. After graduating from Hazelwood Central High School, she attended Southern Illinois University Edwardsville, where she received a Bachelor's degree in English and Journalism.

== Career ==
She started her journalism career with The Bakersfield Californian, a local newspaper in Bakersfield, California. In 2007 she started the 'Black Snob', an award-winning blog.

In 2011 she worked on developing a television show for Black Entertainment Television (BET) called Don't Sleep, hosted by T. J. Holmes; she became its head writer. Although the show was cancelled after 8 months, it was nominated for an NAACP Image Award in 2013.

In 2015 Belton joined The Root, where she was appointed as managing editor in 2016. She was appointed as its first editor-in-chief. She was succeeded by Vanessa de Luca in 2021 when she was selected as editor of HuffPost.
