= Lang Whitaker =

American author and sportswriter

Lang Whitaker is a sportswriter who works for the Memphis Grizzlies as the General Manager of Grizz Gaming, and a contributor to Grind City Media, as well as a contributor to GQ Magazine.

== Career ==
From 2000 to 2013, Whitaker worked as a writer and editor for SLAM Magazine, a hip-hop-influenced basketball magazine. From 2006 to 2008, Whitaker was the editor-in-chief of Striker, an American soccer magazine. From 2008 to 2010, Whitaker wrote a weekly column for Hawks.com, the official site of the Atlanta Hawks. During the 2008–09 NBA season, he did color commentary on several radio broadcasts of Hawks games.

In 2010, he was one of the co-authors of the book "FreeDarko Presents: The Undisputed Guide to Pro Basketball History."

In 2011, he co-founded the sports website The Classical alongside FreeDarko founder Bethlehem Shoals and several others.

From 2011 to 2013, he was GQ's NBA writer for GQ.com. Since 2015, Whitaker has written regularly about cooking and food for GQ.

From 2013 to 2017, he worked for NBA Digital, writing for NBA.com, co-hosting the Hang Time Podcast, and appearing on NBA TV.

== Personal life ==
He attended the University of Georgia and has written for magazines, newspapers and made guest appearances on television. He is an avid fan of Atlanta's three major professional sports franchises: basketball's Atlanta Hawks, baseball's Atlanta Braves, and football's Atlanta Falcons as well as English soccer team Manchester United. Whitaker has also been written about in The New Yorker and The New York Times. He appeared as a cultural commentator on VH1's series "I Love the New Millennium."

His memoir about growing up as a fan of the Atlanta Braves and Bobby Cox, titled "In the Time of Bobby Cox: The Atlanta Braves, Their Manager, My Couch, Two Decades, and Me," was released in March 2011, from Scribner.
