= Jim Spanfeller =

American media executive

James J. Spanfeller Jr. is an American executive known for running Forbes.com from 2001 to 2009. He is currently the CEO of G/O Media which consists primarily of sites that were previously part of Gawker Media. Spanfeller was hired by private equity firm Great Hill Partners to run the company after it was purchased from Univision. He is also a past Chairman of the IAB (Interactive Advertising Bureau) and longtime executive board member of Digital Content Next (DCN).

== Career ==
Spanfeller graduated from Union College with a B.A. in English Literature in 1979 and went to work as a reporter for the SoHo Weekly News. He soon switched to the business side of the paper, and later took a tour through Europe. Upon returning from Europe, Spanfeller took a position at AMP Marketing Systems.

In 1984, Spanfeller was named publisher of Newsweek On Campus magazine. Just under two years later, Spanfeller was replaced as publisher by Scott Kauffman and became the national sales manager of Newsweek magazine in 1986.

Spanfeller was named associate publisher and senior vice president of marketing of Playboy Enterprises in April 1989. In June 1993, Spanfeller became associate publisher for advertising at Inc. magazine, replacing Kristin Norrgard, who left to become publisher of Working Woman magazine.

In 1996, Spanfeller left his job at Inc., where he had become publisher, to become publisher of Yahoo! Internet Life, a joint publication of Ziff-Davis and Yahoo!. Spanfeller was also responsible for advertising sales on the magazine's website and that of Yahoo! Computing.

== Forbes.com ==
Spanfeller was employed by Forbes.com for eight years from 2001 to 2009, when digital and print operations were run separately.

== Daily Meal ==
In 2011, Spanfeller launched The Daily Meal with an estimated $2 million investment. The Daily Meal was acquired by Tronc in 2016.

== G/O Media ==
Spanfeller took over as CEO of G/O Media when Great Hill Partners purchased the company, formerly known as Gizmodo Media Group, and The Onion from Univision on April 8, 2019, and combined the companies. Great Hill Partners did not disclose the financial terms of the private, all equity transaction but stated in a press release that Spanfeller is an investor.

In 2019, G/O Media's sports blog Deadspin received media attention when all of its writers and editors resigned after an edict given by upper management to "stick to sports". A subsequent post on Kinja mocked Spanfeller as a "herb"; after being widely shared on social media, G/O Media removed the post.

In January 2020 the GMG union, which represents the staff of G/O media, announced a vote of no confidence in Spanfeller citing, among other issues, a lack of willingness to negotiate for "functional editorial independence protections."

G/O Media began divesting its websites in 2024, and sold its final website, The Root, in October 2025. Spanfeller subsequently announced G/O Media's closure in a post to its website.
