= Kotaku =

Video game website and blog

- Website type: Gaming blog
- Owner: Keleops
- Creator: Brian Crecente
- Website: kotaku.com
- Commercial: Yes
- Launched: October 2004; 22 years ago

Kotaku is an American video game website and blog originally launched in 2004 as part of the Gawker Media network. Notable former contributors to the site include Luke Smith, Cecilia D'Anastasio, Tim Rogers, and Jason Schreier. The website was acquired by Univision as part of the Gizmodo Media Group in 2016, which was sold to a private equity firm and became G/O Media in 2019 and was again sold to the Swiss media company Keleops in 2025.

== History ==
=== Origins and Gawker Media ===
Kotaku was first launched in October 2004 with Matthew Gallant as its lead writer, with an intended target audience of young men. About a month later, Brian Crecente was brought in to try to save the failing site. Since then, the site has launched several country-specific sites for Australia, Japan, Brazil and the UK. Crecente was named one of the 20 most influential people in the video game industry over the past 20 years by GamePro in 2009 and one of gaming's Top 50 journalists by Edge in 2006. The site has made CNET's "Blog 100" list and was ranked 50th on PC Magazine's "Top 100 Classic Web Sites" list. Its name comes from the Japanese otaku (obsessive fan) and the prefix "ko-" (small in size).

In 2009, Business Insider reported that Hearst Corporation sought to buy Kotaku from Gawker Media.

Stephen Totilo replaced Brian Crecente as the editor in chief in 2012. Totilo had previously joined Kotaku in 2009 as deputy editor.

In April 2014, Gawker Media partnered with Future plc to launch Kotaku UK, and with Allure Media to launch Kotaku Australia.

=== Univision and G/O Media ===
Kotaku was one of several websites that was purchased by Univision Communications in their acquisition of Gawker Media in August 2016; Gizmodo Media Group was subsequently founded to house the Gawker acquisitions, operating under the Fusion Media Group, a division of Univision. The Gizmodo Media Group was later acquired by the private equity firm Great Hill Partners in April 2019, and renamed G/O Media.

In December 2018 Pedestrian Group, owned by the Australian media company Nine Entertainment, acquired Kotaku Australia.

The transition to G/O Media led to several departures from the site, as well as from other sister sites under the former Gawker Media label due to conflicts with G/O Media's management. Cecilia D'Anastasio left Kotaku in December 2019 to become a journalist for Wired. Joshua Rivera and Gita Jackson left in January 2020 stating it was impossible to work with the new management. Jason Schreier, one of Kotaku's writers since 2012 known for his investigative in-depth coverage of working conditions at various studios and development histories for various video games, announced his departure from the site on April 16, 2020, citing the issues surrounding G/O Media which filtered into disruptions at their sister website Deadspin around October 2019. Schreier subsequently took a position at Bloomberg News. In May 2020, senior writer Harper Jay MacIntyre (Note: Formerly known by the pen name "Heather Alexandra", now goes by Harper Jay MacIntyre after a legal name change.) departed from Kotaku, similarly citing conflicts with management, and joined Double Fine Productions as their content and community manager.

Kotaku UK closed on September 9, 2020.

Totilo announced he was departing as editor in chief on February 5, 2021, though will remain in games journalism elsewhere. Riley MacLeod served as interim editor in chief following Totilo's departure, before Patricia Hernandez commenced her tenure as editor in chief from June 2, 2021.

Jen Glennon was appointed editor of the site in October 2023, after previous editor Patricia Hernandez was reportedly fired following a "personal disagreement" in August 2023. In November 2023, G/O Media announced it was laying off 23 people across Kotaku and the company's other websites.

Jen Glennon resigned her position as editor in March 2024, citing an opposition to G/O Media's desire for the site to deprioritize news and instead focus on producing game guides.

In July 2024, it was reported that Kotaku Australia would shut down as part of a cost-cutting effort from third-party publisher Pedestrian Group. In October 2024, Kotaku Australia began to redirect to Kotaku and made its article archive "publicly inaccessible". Aftermath reported that "this not only means the work of dozens of Australian writers over the course of 16 years has been lost, but also thousands of Kotaku US stories as well that, thanks to various server and ownership changes, had only survived via their reposts on Kotaku AU". In March 2025, the Kotaku Australia domain was redirected to a content farm called The Kotaku Times. Aftermath reported the "domain is now registered to an Australia 'SEO Specialist'" and the website is "AI slop".

=== Keleops Media ===
In July 2025, G/O Media sold Kotaku to Gizmodo owner Keleops, a Swiss media company. Keleops CEO Jean-Guillaume Kleis said that the company "had agreed to keep Kotaku's entire staff as part of the deal, as the company did with the Gizmodo acquisition, and that Keleops did not have any plans 'in the short run' to make major changes to its content". Adweek reported that by acquiring Kotaku, Keleops "is deepening its presence in English-language publishing, as the company plans to invest in Kotaku's editorial growth and maintain its existing team".

== Controversies ==
In 2007, attorney Jack Thompson sued Gawker Media and site editor Brian Crecente over concerns that Kotaku declined to remove threatening user comments, but the lawsuit was dismissed the next day.

In 2010, Kotaku criticized Japanese magazine Famitsu's glowing endorsement of Konami's PlayStation Portable game Metal Gear Solid: Peace Walker as a conflict of interest. In response, Konami revoked Kotaku's invitation to the game's launch party.

On October 9, 2021, Kotaku published an article about Metroid Dread, which had been released a day prior, running on Nintendo Switch emulators. The article praised the game's performance on emulators (said to be better than on the Nintendo Switch itself), thanked "pirates, emulators, modders, and hackers", and suggested readers emulate older or expensive games themselves. The article was criticized for promoting piracy, especially of newly released games, but was also noted to have sparked wider discussions about the role of emulation in video game preservation. On October 10, Kotaku revised the article to clarify they were referring to game preservation and, after a complaint from Nintendo on a later date, removed all mentions of piracy from the article. Kotaku also issued an apology and stated that, though they believed emulation was "a vital part of the world of gaming", they did not condone using it to acquire games illegally.

=== Blacklistings ===
In 2007, Kotaku ran a story about rumored upcoming features on the PlayStation 3, and Sony responded by temporarily blacklisting the website. In 2015, Kotaku claimed that they had been blacklisted by major video game companies Bethesda Softworks and Ubisoft. Because of this blacklist, Kotaku opted not to be a jury member in the Game Awards when invited by Geoff Keighley in 2019.

In 2023, Kotaku was blacklisted by Nintendo, reportedly over articles that covered leaks of unreleased Nintendo games. Further controversy followed when then senior writer Luke Plunkett posted a picture of a World War II-era US fighter plane with victory marks counting downed German and Japanese aircraft.

=== Gamergate harassment campaign ===
In 2014, Kotaku was part of the accusations that instigated the harassment campaign known as Gamergate when a writer from the site, Nathan Grayson, was falsely accused of writing a favorable review of the game Depression Quest as a result of his relationship with its developer, Zoë Quinn. After conducting an internal review, it was discovered that no review of Depression Quest existed and he had only written one article that mentioned Quinn in passing before their relationship began. The subreddit KotakuInAction became a hub for the Gamergate community. Its creator attempted to shut it down in 2018, claiming that it had become "infested with racism and sexism", but it was reinstated by a Reddit administrator due to the site's guidelines.

In March 2024, the narrative development studio Sweet Baby Inc. became the target of claims from online users who said that it promoted a "woke agenda". Kotaku editor Alyssa Mercante became the target of harassment from users after publishing an article on the backlash. Media outlets such as The Week, Wired, and The Verge compared the backlash to Gamergate or dubbed it "Gamergate 2.0".

=== Bobby Kotick ===
In March 2025, former Activision Blizzard CEO Bobby Kotick sued G/O Media for defamation, claiming articles in Kotaku and Gizmodo which noted his interest in acquiring TikTok repeated claims of widespread workplace misconduct on his watch at Activision without noting that the claims were investigated and dismissed by state regulators. Kotick said he and his representatives repeatedly asked for corrections to the articles.
