= Paul Ford (technologist) =

American writer (born 1974)

Paul Ford (born August 11, 1974) is an American writer, programmer, and entrepreneur, based in New York City.

In 1997, he started Ftrain.com, one of the earliest blogs. He wrote for Harper's Magazine from 2004 to 2010 and as of July 2023 is a regular contributor to Wired Magazine; he has been published in The New Yorker, The New York Times Magazine, MIT Technology Review, and NPR.

In 2015, he published a 38,000-word article in Bloomberg Businessweek titled "What is Code", a "deep dive into the meaning, practice, culture, and business of software", and the longest article ever run in the magazine. The piece won a National Magazine Award in 2016, was included in The Best American Magazine Writing 2016 published by the American Society of Magazine Editors and Columbia University Press, and Ford, together with Bloomberg editor Josh Tyrangiel, appeared on Charlie Rose to discuss it.

Ford is the author of The Secret Lives of Web Pages first published in 2016, with an updated edition forthcoming in 2025.

He is a co-founder of Aboard, an AI startup, and Postlight, a design and digital strategy consultancy that was acquired by NTT Data in 2022. He served as an advisor to the White House Office of Digital Strategy during the Obama Administration.
