= R/KotakuInAction =

Subreddit involved with Gamergate

r/KotakuInAction is a subreddit created in 2014. It was one of the main online hubs for participants in the misogynistic harassment campaign known as Gamergate.

== History and content ==
When users join r/KotakuInAction, they are warned that they will be banned from other subreddits, including r/OffMyChest (where users express opinions and share personal thoughts); r/NaturalHair; and r/Rape (a support forum for rape survivors that was brigaded by r/KotakuInAction users).

On July 12, 2018, r/KotakuInAction's creator and head moderator removed all of the sub's other moderators and set the forum to private, alleging that the sub had become "infested with racism and sexism". A Reddit employee restored the forum and its moderators an hour later.

== Reception ==
BuzzFeed's Joseph Bernstein reported that many of r/KotakuInAction's moderators also moderate other subreddits "devoted to either the physical and emotional degradation and humiliation of women, or in subreddits devoted to mocking and delegitimizing the arguments and appearances of feminists and 'social justice warriors'".

In 2016, three scholars from the Georgia Institute of Technology wrote an academic paper analyzing r/KotakuInAction and "the border between controversial speech and harassment".

A 2020 review analyzing ten discussion boards on r/KotakuInAction suggested a connection between Gamergate and right-wing extremism (RWE). According to the review, the three main themes in these discussion boards were "RWE bigotry", "always anti-left" and "hate speech is free speech".

== See also ==
- Controversial Reddit communities
