= Kagyu Shenpen Kunchab =

Tibetan Buddhist center and stupa in Santa Fe, New Mexico, US

Coordinates: 35°38′6.31″N 106°2′26.91″W

Religion
- Affiliation: Shangpa Kagyu & Karma Kagyu

Location
- Location: 3777 KSK Lane; Santa Fe, New Mexico
- Country: USA
- Interactive map of Kagyu Shenpen Kunchab

Architecture
- Completed: 1986

Website
- www.nobletruth.org

Kagyu Shenpen Kunchab (KSK) is a Tibetan Buddhist center of the Kagyu School located in Santa Fe, New Mexico. The temple complex features the Kagyu Shenpen Kunchab Bodhi Stupa, a 69 foot (21 m) tall stupa. The primary practice of the temple is that of Avalokiteśvara, the bodhisattva of compassion. The popular Tibetan female bodhisattva Tara is also honored.

Kagyu Shenpen Kunchab was founded in 1975 by Tibetan lama Karma Dorje, who was sent to establish a Buddhist center by his teacher, Kalu Rinpoche.

== Kagyu Shenpen Kunchab Bodhi Stupa ==
The Kagyu Shenpen Kunchab Bodhi Stupa stands 69 feet (21 m) in height with a 12 foot (3.7 m) bronze spire. Lama Karma Dorje started building the stupa in 1983 together with local practitioners. The stupa was finished in 1986 and was consecrated by H.E. Kalu Rinpoche.

The stupa contains Buddhist relics and the interior is brightly painted with Buddhist deities.

== See also ==
- Buddhism in the United States
- List of Buddhist temples
