= Anna Holmes =

American writer and editor

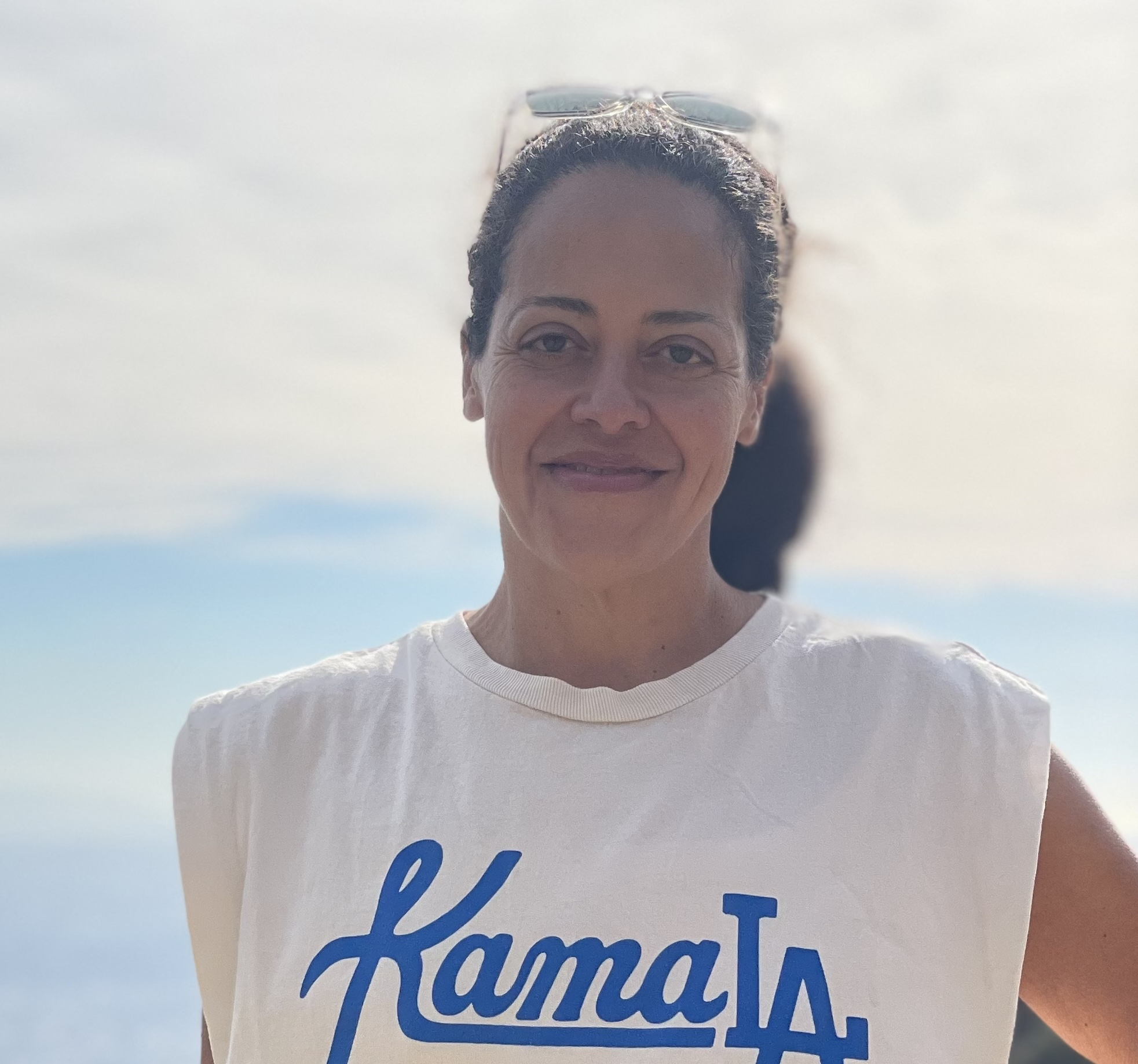
- Anna Holmes in Griffith Park, Los Angeles
- Born: California, United States
- Education: New York University
- Known for: Founder of the Jezebel blog
- Awards: Mirror Award for Best Commentary, 2012
- Website: annaholmes.com

Anna Holmes is an American writer and editor. In 2007, she founded the Gawker Media women-focused site Jezebel.

== Early life and education ==
Holmes was born in California and studied journalism at New York University.

== Career ==
In 2007, she founded Jezebel. Writing for Mother Jones, Tasneem Raja says Holmes developed "a site for women interested in both fashion and how the models were treated. She built it into a traffic behemoth, with 32 million monthly pageviews and beloved features like Photoshop of Horrors and Crap Email From a Dude." Rebecca Carroll described Holmes's Jezebel launch as drawing "immediate attention with its off-color humor (similar in tone to Gawker, but more so a refreshingly new tone altogether), feminine bluster and fearless, pointed criticism of mainstream women’s magazines, an industry in which Holmes worked for many years, for perpetuating unattainable ideals of beauty and an endless (heterosexual) preoccupation with men." Holmes served as editor-in-chief until she left the site in 2010.

She has been a columnist for the New York Times Sunday Book Review and has previously served as editorial director at Fusion. She joined Fusion as editor of digital voices and storytelling in 2014, part of a "Web talent grab for a fledgling TV channel: [f]irst Felix Salmon, now a much-admired writer and editor."

Her work has appeared in The New Yorker and Time. In April 2016, Holmes joined First Look Media as senior vice-president of editorial to develop a new media property, Topic, focused on visual storytelling. In 2018, Topic won two prestigious National Magazine Awards, making Holmes the third Black editor-in-chief to ever receive the honor.

Holmes was a staff writer for Glamour.

She currently writes the "Work Friend" column for the New York Times. When she took over the column, Holmes noted that she had recently written an advice column for Bloomberg Businessweek called "Sad Desk Salad".

== Works ==
- Hell Hath No Fury: Women's Letters from the End of the Affair, Random House Publishing Group, 2003, ISBN 9780345465443
- The Book of Jezebel: An Illustrated Encyclopedia of Lady Things, Grand Central Publishing, 2013, ISBN 9781455502790
