= Gizmodo Media Group =

Media group owned by Univision Communications

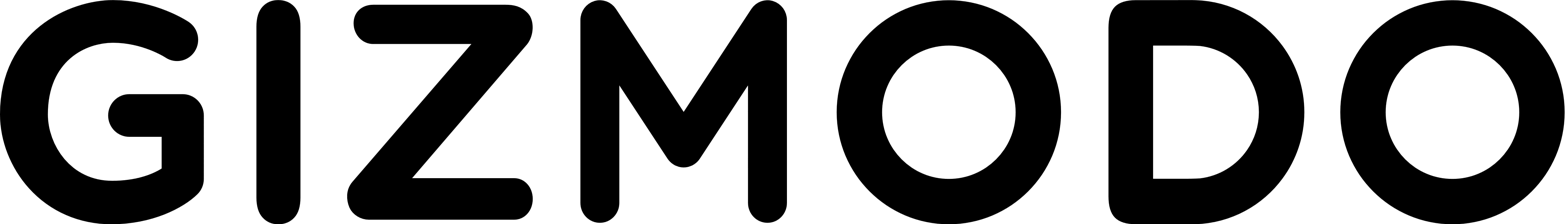
- Company type: Subsidiary
- Predecessor: Gawker Media
- Founded: September 22, 2016; 9 years ago
- Defunct: 8 April 2019; 7 years ago (2 years, 6 months and 17 days)
- Fate: Acquired by Great Hill Partners, folded into G/O Media
- Successor: G/O Media
- Headquarters: New York City, U.S.
- Parent: Fusion Media Group
- Subsidiaries: Deadspin; Lifehacker; Gizmodo; Kotaku io9 Jalopnik; Splinter; The Root; Jezebel; Earther; The Takeout

Gizmodo Media Group was an online media company and blog network formerly operated by Univision Communications (now TelevisaUnivision) in its Fusion Media Group division. The company was created from assets acquired from Gawker Media during its bankruptcy in 2016. In April 2019, Gizmodo and The Onion were sold to private equity firm Great Hill Partners, which combined them into a new company named G/O Media.

== History ==
=== Univision acquisition (2016) ===
On June 10, 2016, Gawker Media filed for Chapter 11 bankruptcy protection after the company was ordered to pay $115 million in compensatory damages and a further $25 million in punitive damages in Bollea v. Gawker.

On August 16, 2016, Univision Communications purchased Gawker for $135 million. The purchase did not include the flagship website Gawker. It included the websites Gizmodo, Jezebel, Deadspin, Kotaku, Jalopnik, and Lifehacker. Univision named the unit Gizmodo Media Group after one of its blogs, Gizmodo, in an effort to distance itself from the Gawker name.

On September 10, 2016, Univision removed six controversial posts from various Gawker Media sites, each with the note: "This story is no longer available as it is the subject of pending litigation against the prior owners of this site."

On September 21, 2016, Raju Narisetti was named as CEO of Gizmodo Media Group.

=== Very Smart Brothas ===
On July 7, 2017, Gizmodo Media Group acquired the blog Very Smart Brothas.

=== Earther ===
In September 2017, Gizmodo Media Group launched its first new stand-alone site since acquisition from Gawker Media, Earther, devoted to environmental news, with Managing Editor Maddie Stone.

=== Televisa ===
In December 2017, Gizmodo Media Group announced a partnership with Mexican media conglomerate Televisa to launch Spanish-language editions of websites such as Gizmodo, Deadspin, Kotaku, Jalopnik and Jezebel.

=== Struggles and sale ===
On May 8, 2018, the GMG Special Projects Desk published an article that highlighted various issues plaguing Univision.

On June 28, 2018, The Daily Beast reported that over forty GMG staffers would be taking union-negotiated buyouts, thereby averting layoffs.

On July 10, 2018, Univision announced that it would "explore" the option of selling all of the Gizmodo Media Group and The Onion websites under its ownership.

=== Great Hill Partners acquisition (2019) ===
In April 2019, private equity firm Great Hill Partners agreed to purchase Gizmodo Media Group and The Onion from Univision. The sale was completed on April 8, 2019, with Gizmodo Media Group and The Onion being combined into a new company named G/O Media.
