= G/O Media =

American media company, 2019–2025

G/O Media Inc.
- Type: Private
- Predecessor: Gizmodo Media Group
- Founded: April 8, 2019; 7 years ago
- Defunct: 2025
- Headquarters: New York City, US
- Key people: Jim Spanfeller (CEO)
- Owner: Great Hill Partners
- Website: g-omedia.com

G/O Media Inc. was an American media holding company that owned and operated several digital media outlets.

It was formed in 2019 after the private equity firm Great Hill Partners purchased two digital portfolios from Univision: Gizmodo Media Group (Gizmodo, Jezebel, Deadspin, Lifehacker, Splinter, The Root, Kotaku, and Jalopnik) and the Onion portfolio (The Onion, ClickHole, The A.V. Club, and The Takeout). Since 2023, the company has sold off many of its outlets, including The Onion and Gizmodo, which were the source of "the G and O of its name". By October 2025, it had no remaining outlets and was in the process of sunsetting its operations.

== History ==
G/O was formed in April 2019 when Great Hill Partners, a private equity firm, purchased the websites from Univision for $18.9 million. Prior to the sale, the former Gawker Media properties had operated as Gizmodo Media Group after being acquired by Univision following the conclusion of the Bollea v. Gawker lawsuit and subsequent bankruptcy in 2016. Former Forbes executive Jim Spanfeller became the CEO of G/O Media. In the first twelve months following its purchase of the websites, G/O shut down Splinter News in November 2019 and sold ClickHole in February 2020 to Cards Against Humanity.

In mid-October 2021, G/O Media removed all images from stories published before the acquisition by Great Hill Partners in 2019 from the 11 websites it owned, including Gizmodo, Jalopnik, Deadspin, The A.V. Club, The Onion, and Jezebel. No reason was given, but it was speculated to be related to copyright infringement lawsuits the company was involved in.

From 2023 onwards, the company began to dispose of sites that it owned, with Lifehacker being sold in March 2023 to Ziff Davis, while Jezebel was shuttered and then sold in November 2023 to Paste, along with Splinter News. In January 2024, Adweek reported that G/O Media was looking to sell off the remaining sites under its ownership, following failed efforts to find buyers for the whole organization. The company claimed the reporting was "largely incorrect" but didn't specify how. On March 11, 2024, G/O Media sold Deadspin to the European startup Lineup Publishing, which immediately laid off all of Deadspin's employees. Later that month, G/O Media sold The A.V. Club to Paste and The Takeout to Static Media, and it was reported that the company was actively looking for buyers of The Onion which was sold in April 2024 to a company called Global Tetrahedron.

Gizmodo, with the website's entire staff, was purchased by the European digital media company Keleops Media on June 4, 2024. The Daily Beast noted that "with the sale of Gizmodo, G/O Media no longer owns the brands that made up the G and O of its name. The company's dwindling portfolio at that time consisted only of the business news site Quartz, the African-American culture outlet The Root, the gaming site Kotaku, the gearhead publication Jalopnik, and the commerce site The Inventory. Jalopnik was acquired by Static Media in October 2024. Also in October 2024, G/O Media filed a lawsuit against Paste Media, alleging a breach in contract from the sale of Jezebel and Splinter.

The Inventory and Quartz were sold to Redbrick in April 2025. Kotaku was sold to Keleops in July 2025. This sale left G/O Media with only one outlet, The Root. The New York Times reported that Spanfeller stated it had "became clear to our investors that it was time to move on", which was an allusion "to a series of challenges that have faced the digital media industry in recent years". Spanfeller also commented that they wanted "to find a buyer for The Root" but that G/O Media "will exit having increased shareholder value". Adweek explained that G/O Media began "pursuing individual buyers after abandoning its search for a portfolio-wide acquisition" and this "move reflected both strategic necessity and a grim outlook for digital publishing, where traffic has declined and monetization models face growing pressure".

The company's last digital outlet, The Root, was sold to Ashley Allison's company Watering Hole Media in October 2025.

== Staff conflicts with leadership ==
G/O Media's leadership, introduced after the purchase from Univision, has been subject to frequent criticism by employees. Complaints include closer advertiser relationships, a lack of diversity, and suppression of reporting about the company itself. In October 2019, Deadspin's editor-in-chief, Barry Petchesky, was fired for refusing to adhere to a directive that the site "stick to sports". Soon after, the entirety of Deadspin's staff resigned in protest, leaving the site inactive. In November 2021, Gawker reported of approximately 75% of staff at Jezebel resigning over the course of 2021. The resignations were reportedly related to a "hostile work environment" created by G/O's management and the new deputy editorial director Lea Goldman. In January 2022, another article detailed similar staff decline at The Root, with 15 out of 16 full-time employees having left throughout 2021, since Vanessa De Luca started as editor-in-chief, while at The A.V. Club, seven senior staff members left the site after management required them to move from Chicago to Los Angeles. According to the Chicago Tribune, the departing staffers cited a lack of salary increase to account for higher cost of living due to the transfer.

The company also saw multiple disputes with the employee unions. In January 2020, the GMG Union, which represents the staff of six G/O Media sites, announced a vote of no confidence in CEO Jim Spanfeller, citing, among other issues, a lack of willingness to negotiate for "functional editorial independence protections". On February 4, 2021, the Writers Guild of America, East, filed a complaint with the National Labor Relations Board alleging that G/O Media told employees it had fired Alex Cranz for labor activism. On March 1, 2022, GMG Union members went on strike after failing to reach an agreement on a new contract. The strike was resolved on March 6 with a new contract that included some of the members' terms. On June 29, 2023, G/O Media implemented a "modest test" of AI-generated content on its websites, in a move similar to BuzzFeed and CNET. This sparked backlash from GMG Union members, who cited AI's track record of false statements and plagiarism from its training data, with basic errors in the generated content also attracting attention. In January 2024, a strike involving members of the Onion Union, which represents workers at other G/O Media sites, was narrowly averted following an agreement.

== Acquisitions ==
- Quartz (April 2022)

== Sold properties ==
- ClickHole to Cards Against Humanity (February 2020)
- Lifehacker to Ziff Davis (March 2023)
- Jezebel and Splinter News to Paste (November 2023)
- Deadspin to Lineup Publishing (March 2024)
- The A.V. Club to Paste (March 2024)
- The Takeout to Static Media (March 2024)
- The Onion to Global Tetrahedron (April 2024)
- Gizmodo to Keleops Media (June 2024)
- Jalopnik to Static Media (October 2024)
- The Inventory and Quartz to Redbrick (April 2025)
- Kotaku to Keleops Media (July 2025)
- The Root to Watering Hole Media (October 2025)
