= Splinter News =

American news and opinion website

Splinter
- Website type: Website
- Predecessor: Fusion.net
- Owners: Gizmodo Media Group (2017–2019); G/O Media (2019); Paste (2024–present)
- Editor: Jacob Weindling
- Website: splinter.com
- Commercial: Yes
- Registration: Optional
- Launched: July 24, 2017; 9 years ago
- Current status: Active

Splinter (originally fusion.net) was an American left-leaning news and opinion website that was announced in 2017. The outlet originated from channel Fusion TV's website, which was relaunched by Gizmodo Media Group as Splinter in July 2017. It ceased publication in November 2019 following Gizmodo's reorganization into G/O Media.

The dormant publication was acquired by Paste Media in November 2023 and relaunched March 26, 2024. In November 2025, Paste Media announced that Splinter would be merged into Jezebel, with a branded section on the latter's website.

== Content and reception ==
The site is a news and opinion website. According to former owner Fusion Media Group, the site's purpose is to offer a sharp point of view, amplify underrepresented voices, shine a light on systemic inequality, and skewer politicians when necessary as well as contextualize current events, challenge archaic establishments, and champion the historically oppressed. They are generally described as having a left-leaning editorial stance.

The publication wrote a controversial article containing Stephen Miller's phone number. At its original shut down in 2019, Paste wrote a "requiem" for the publication.

== History ==
=== Background and relaunch by Gizmodo (2017—2019) ===
Splinter began as the article part of the Fusion TV website in 2013. Univision later acquired the assets of Gizmodo Media Group which gave it a significant web presence. The decision was made to separate the Fusion TV channel from its news and editorial site. The reasoning for the change being that it would provide clarity between the news site and the cable network whose content was broadening and moving further and further away from what the site was publishing.

On July 24, 2017, Fusion relaunched its article-based online presence under the brand Splinter while things relating to the channel itself remained at Fusion.net branded as Fusion TV. The article-based half of Fusion's website content switched to the fusion.kinja.com domain in May prior to the re-branding. Splinter began under the Gizmodo Media Group division of Univision.

On October 10, 2019, Splinter announced it was ceasing publication, following Gizmodo Media Group's dissolution and reorganization into G/O Media. The staff posted the last post on November 12, 2019. Staff from Splinter started the independent Discourse Blog in March 2020.

=== Relaunch by Paste Media and merger (2023—present) ===
On November 29, 2023, it was announced that Jezebel and Splinter were acquired by Paste Media in an all-cash deal. Josh Jackson, a co-founder and the editor-in-chief of Paste, commented that they had not considered purchasing the websites until after learning of Jezebel's closure in November 2023. Jackson announced plans to relaunch Splinter in 2024 ahead of the 2024 United States elections. Splinter officially relaunched on March 26, 2024, with new editor-in-chief Jacob Weindling, who was previously a politics staff writer for Paste.

On November 21, 2025, Jackson announced that Splinter would be merged into Jezebel with its opinions and news coverage in a dedicated Splinter section on Jezebel's website; the website's archive, from the start of Splinter "as part of Fusion TV to its latest iteration under Weindling's leadership", will also be included in this section. Jackson explained that while Paste Media had revived two inactive outlets, Splinter "had lain dormant far longer" than Jezebel, and that, along with ongoing industry pressures, led the company to combine the two under the Jezebel brand. Jackson wrote that Weindling will continue "to write every week as Splinter's Editor-at-Large".
