= Jezebel (website) =

Website targeted toward women

- Available in: English
- Owners: Gawker Media (2007–2016); Univision Communications (2016–2019); G/O Media (2019–2023); Paste (2023–present)
- Founder: Anna Holmes
- Website: jezebel.com
- Commercial: Yes
- Launched: May 21, 2007; 19 years ago
- Current status: Active

Jezebel is a US-based website featuring news and cultural commentary geared towards women. It was launched in 2007 by Gawker Media under the editorship of Anna Holmes as a feminist counterpoint to traditional women's magazines.

After the breakup of Gawker Media, the site was purchased by Univision Communications and later acquired by G/O Media. The site stopped publishing on November 9, 2023, when parent company G/O Media laid off its staff. It was then acquired by Paste on November 29, 2023, with the website officially relaunched on December 11, 2023. In November 2025, Paste Media announced that Splinter would be merged into Jezebel, with a dedicated section on the latter's website.

== History ==
=== Gawker Media (2007–2016) ===
Jezebel was launched on May 21, 2007, as the 14th Gawker Media blog. According to founding editor Anna Holmes, who had previously worked at Glamour, Star, and InStyle, the site stemmed from the desire to better serve Gawker.com's female readers, who made up 70% of the site's readership at the time.

At the site's launch, the editorial staff included Holmes; editor Moe Tkacik, a former Wall Street Journal reporter; and associate editor Jennifer Gerson, a former assistant to Elle editor-in-chief Roberta Myers. Gerson left the site in May 2008 to become the Women's Editor for the Polo Ralph Lauren website; Tkacik departed in August 2008 to work at Gawker.com, after briefly accepting and then rescinding a job offer from Radar. Tkacik was subsequently laid off in a company-wide restructuring the following October. Holmes left the site in June 2010; Jessica Coen replaced her as editor-in-chief before stepping down in 2014. Other staffers included Madeleine Davies, Kelly Faircloth, Hillary Crosley, Kate Dries and Callie Beusman.

In December 2007, Jezebel reached ten million monthly views. Gawker's owner Nick Denton pointed to Jezebel's soaring popularity as one reason for a drop-off in traffic at the company's main site, Gawker.com, which fell from more than 11 million page views in October 2007 to about eight million in December. Three years after its founding, Jezebel had surpassed the page traffic of its parent site.

=== Univision and G/O Media (2016–2023) ===
Jezebel was one of six websites that was purchased by Univision Communications in their acquisition of Gawker Media in August 2016. Univision sold the site in 2019 to a private-equity firm, which combined various former Gawker publications under the name of G/O Media. According to The New York Times, feminist publications such as Jezebel have been particularly affected by financial turmoil within the news industry.

In August 2021, Laura Bassett was announced as editor in chief. In November 2021, Gawker reported on substantial staff resignations at Jezebel over the course of 2021, comprising around 75% of staff. The resignations were reportedly related to a "hostile work environment" created by G/O's management and the new deputy editorial director Lea Goldman.

In August 2023, Laura Bassett stepped down as editor in chief, claiming G/O had mistreated her staff.

In October 2023, it was reported that G/O Media wanted to sell Jezebel. On November 9, 2023, G/O Media suspended the publication of Jezebel and laid off 23 editorial staffers as part of wider restructuring, having failed to find a buyer for the site. G/O Media CEO Jim Spanfeller stated that their "business model and the audiences we serve across our network did not align with Jezebel's" and that advertisers had become "more cautious about spending". Former staff, via a statement released by their union WGA East, responded that they were "devastated though hardly surprised at G/O Media and Jim Spanfeller's inability to run our website and their cruel decision to shutter it" and that the closure underscores the "fundamental flaws in the ad-supported media model". 404 Media commented that Jezebel was difficult to monetize due to concerns around brand safety in advertising as "the advertising industry has singled out the issues the audience cares about most, like reproductive rights, as unsuitable to sell ads against, even though a ton of people want to read about them". Lauren Tousignant, Jezebel's interim editor in chief, explained to 404 Media that in addition to concerns around adjacency in advertising "Jezebel was told not to put certain words like 'fucking' or 'suck' in a headline unless it was directly quoting someone".

=== Paste magazine (2023–present) ===
On November 29, 2023, it was announced that Jezebel and Splinter were acquired by Paste in an all-cash deal; this deal includes both the archive of content and the Jezebel brand. Josh Jackson, a co-founder and the editor-in-chief of Paste, commented that they had not considered purchasing it until after learning of Jezebel's closure. The New York Times reported that Jezebel was sold without employees so Jackson "was aiming to first find an editor in chief for Jezebel and then hire writers". Adweek stated "Paste plans to rehire as many former staff as it can afford to" and that the outlet "will resume publishing within the next few days". This relaunch would have a standalone website distinct from Paste's website with Jezebel retaining "its signature voice, style and subject matter" but each outlet will link and highlight each other's content when "relevant to both audiences".

It relaunched on December 11, 2023, under editor-in-chief Lauren Tousignant, who was interim editor of Jezebel's prior incarnation. On November 21, 2025, Paste Media president Josh Jackson announced that Splinter would be merged into Jezebel with its opinions and news coverage in a dedicated Splinter section on Jezebel's website; additional entertainment coverage from sister sites, The A.V. Club and Paste Magazine, will also be incorporated. Jackson wrote that "Tousignant will continue serving as Jezebel's Editor-in-Chief, with former Splinter EIC Jacob Weindling continuing to write every week as Splinter's Editor-at-Large". Tousignant resigned from Jezebel in April 2026. As of October 2026, Jezebel's masthead listed "eight total people working for the site, including just one full-time staff writer".

In October 2026, The Washington Post reported that "more than 100 articles", including very old articles, have been removed from Jezebel's website. These removed articles feature R-rated words, "racy words", or "the word abortion" in headlines. This was condemned by former Jezebel staffers, including article writers. William Sagan, the publisher of Paste, stated articles have not been removed for targeted reasons; he explained that some older articles are moved "into draft status" while awaiting review on issues such as broken links, "significant content or grammar problems or for other reasons". Anna Merlan, a former Jezebel writer (2014–2019) who now writes for Mother Jones, reported that Sagan "had been on a 'mass deletion spree' after an advertising and analytics company generated a list of 4,000 articles on the site whose headlines were 'not brand safe'". Splinter's Weindling stated "he thought at least 1,000 Jezebel and Splinter articles had been removed". Merlan commented that her own articles had been removed, many of which were on topics besides abortion or rape. Sagan disputed these accounts. Some articles were restored following The Washington Post's report, however, many were missing bylines and art. Weindling subsequently announced on Bluesky he would no longer write for Splinter.

== Contents ==
Founding editor Anna Holmes says she sought to create a counterpart to women's print magazines such as Vogue and Cosmopolitan. According to Jordan Michael Smith, Holmes "hated [Glamour's] worship of luxury, the lack of racial diversity, and the shallowness of women’s publications generally". The site was launched with the tagline "Celebrity. Sex. Fashion. Without airbrushing." Emma Goldberg of The New York Times describes the site's hallmark as "feminist cultural criticism, with an edge".

A regular feature called "Photoshop of Horrors" documents retouched photographs in fashion magazines. On its first day of operation, Jezebel offered a $10,000 reward for the best example of a magazine cover photo prior to being retouched for publication. The winning entry, announced in July 2007, was a photo of country singer Faith Hill from the cover of Redbook. Jezebel pointed out 11 different ways the photo had been altered, including radically distorting Hill's left arm.

A 2007 post by Tkacik said, "Jezebel is a blog for women that will attempt to take all the essentially meaningless but sweet stuff directed our way and give it a little more meaning, while taking more the serious stuff and making it more fun, or more personal, or at the very least the subject of our highly sophisticated brand of sex joke. Basically, we wanted to make the sort of women's magazine we'd want to read." One of the site's guiding principles, according to Holmes, is to avoid saying "misogynist things about women's weight."

== Editors-in-chief ==
Editor-in-Chief	Editor From	Editor To	Ref.
Anna Holmes	2007	2010	
Jessica Coen	2010	2014	
Emma Carmichael	2014	2017	
Koa Beck	2017	2018	
Julianne Escobedo Shepherd	2018	2021	
Laura Bassett	2021	2023	
Lauren Tousignant	2023	2026	

== Media attention and influence ==
Jezebel's format influenced other women-focused websites, including Slate magazine's Double X, xoJane, The Hairpin, and The Frisky.

Media coverage of the Faith Hill photo controversy included discussion and interviews on NBC's Today show and in several other publications. Redbook editor-in-chief Stacy Morrison said that their retouching of Hill's photo was in line with industry standards and that Redbook was investigating how the unretouched image had been released.

A July 2008 article in the Ottawa Citizen included Jezebel as one of several sites launched as part of the "online estrogen revolution," referring to a comScore finding that community-based women's websites were tied with political sites as the Internet's fastest-growing category. The article also cited Ad Age's research showing that women's Internet use is outpacing men's.

In 2010, Jezebel received widespread media coverage when it criticized The Daily Show for its treatment of women writers and correspondents. As a result of this publicity, the site was parodied as "JoanOfSnark.com" on an episode of 30 Rock, "TGS Hates Women". Former Gawker staff writer Emily Gould criticized the site in an essay for Slate, saying its pop-culture criticism and "righteously indignant rage" was simply "petty jealousy ... marketed as feminism".

Kashmir Hill of Forbes has been critical of the blog on two occasions. In 2012, Jezebel faced criticism when it published screen shots of a video depicting a rape and some users threatened to boycott the site. Later, in November 2012, Jezebel was criticized for publicizing the names of teenagers who posted racist tweets in response to Barack Obama's re-election.

The website has been criticized at times for how it handles race issues, including its selection in July 2014 of a white woman as the new editor-in-chief over a black candidate who had been with the site since its founding.

In 2014, Jezebel writers accused the company Gawker Media of failing to address a campaign of harassment against its staff and readers, which included rape-themed images and threats of violence. In the post, which was titled "We Have a Rape Gif Problem and Gawker Media Won't Do Anything About It" the site's staff wrote that "an individual or individuals has been using anonymous, untraceable burner accounts to post gifs of violent pornography in the discussion section of stories on Jezebel" for months.

In 2014, Caitlin Dewey of The Washington Post criticized Jezebel for its article about Vogue's February issue, which depicted a retouched photograph of actress Lena Dunham on its cover along with retouched images of her within. Dewey described it as a "feminist self-parody", stating that "[Editor-in-chief Jessica] Coen doesn't just object to the type of unrealistic, unhealthy Photoshopping that warps our collective perception of what constitutes a normal size and shape, but to alterations of any kind", which she believes "doesn't really further that cause" of combating distorted body image in advertising.

Confusion has sometimes arisen over whether an article by Jezebel was satirical or not. In 2021, they posted an article asking why the upcoming Mortal Kombat movie did not feature notable female fighting character Chun-Li. Confused fans quickly pointed out that Chun-Li was from the Street Fighter franchise, which is entirely separate from the Mortal Kombat franchise. NME speculated that the article may have been satirizing fan reactions to Johnny Cage not being in the trailer. However, Jezebel later updated their article with a correction, showing that the article was not written in satire.

On September 8, 2025, Jezebel published an article about witches on the e-commerce website Etsy who sell hexes towards an individual of someone's choosing, specifically targeting right-wing political activist Charlie Kirk. After Kirk was assassinated two days later, Jezebel added an editor's note to the article condemning the shooting "in the strongest possible terms" and removed the article's author from the byline. Paste president Josh Jackson stated that the article "was a tongue-in-cheek exploration of people selling hexes on Etsy, and intended as a satirical response to Charlie Kirk's rhetoric over the years", adding that "the writer was very clear that she didn't want real harm to come to Kirk." An updated editor's note stated while they "stand by every word" of the satire piece and that it was "absolutely clear" there was no intent to cause "physical harm", Jezebel had removed the article's original text "in light of Wednesday's events, and on the recommendation of our lawyers". Jezebel explained that "this decision was driven by an abundance of caution for our staff and to avoid the piece being misused in a tense and volatile environment, not by a change in our editorial judgment. We may republish at a later date, but out of compassion for the victim's family, we want to make clear that we prioritize an end to violence over anyone wanting to read about Etsy witches".
