= Stick to sports =

Phrase in sports journalism

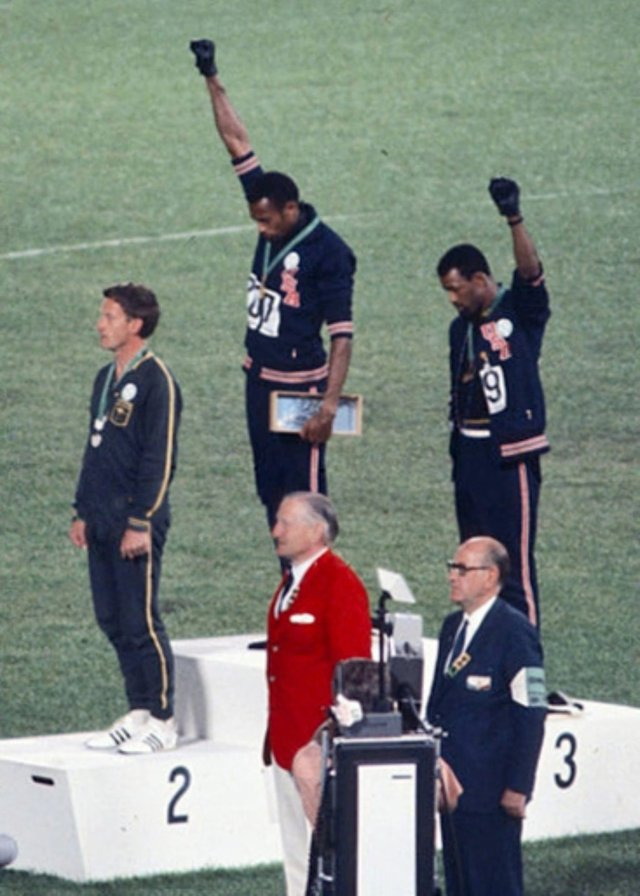
200 m gold medalist Tommie Smith (center) and bronze medalist John Carlos (right) making a Black Power salute during the medal ceremony at the 1968 Summer Olympics

"Stick to sports" is a phrase used in sports journalism and scholarship, primarily in the United States, to indicate the view that professional athletes should refrain from political or cultural commentary.

In the United States, the notion that athletes should avoid commenting on social issues has waxed and waned over time. Jesse Owens represents one early example of an athlete who refused to "stick to sports". In the 1960s and 1970s, athletes including Billie Jean King, Muhammad Ali, and Jackie Robinson frequently made public statements about the news of the day. A later generation of athletes, however, increasingly refrained from such commentary. In the 2010s and 2020s, with the rise of Black Lives Matter in response to events such as the killing of Eric Garner and killing of Trayvon Martin, athlete-activists such as Crystal Dunn, Jason Heyward, Colin Kaepernick, and LeBron James once again began to draw attention to issues including racial inequality.

A 2019 experimental study found that audience perceptions of a fictional athlete who refused to "stick to sports" in public became more negative, but perceptions of the athlete's team did not change. Proponents of sticking to sports argue that athletes should not step outside of their assigned role and that activism can interfere with athletics. Detractors view athlete activists as bravely leveraging their influence to support important causes despite the personal cost.

Athletes who do not stick to sports are often viewed as troublemakers by sports executives fearful of alienating fan bases. For instance, the NBA estimated that Daryl Morey's October 2019 tweet in support of the 2019–20 Hong Kong protests drew reactions that later cost the league up to $200 million.

== See also ==
- Politics and sports
- Racism in sport
