= Deadspin =

Sports news and blog website

- Website type: Sports
- Owners: Gawker Media (2005–2016); Univision Communications (2016–2019); G/O Media (2019–2024); Lineup Publishing (2024–present)
- Industry: Sports journalism
- Website: deadspin.com
- Commercial: Yes
- Registration: Optional
- Launched: September 9, 2005; 21 years ago
- Current status: Active

Deadspin is a sports blog owned by Lineup Publishing. Founded by Will Leitch in 2005 and originally based in Chicago, it was then sold to Gawker Media, Univision Communications and finally G/O Media. After disagreements with G/O Media management, the entire editorial staff would resign to launch Defector Media, causing the site to halt publishing. After eventually hiring a second editorial staff, the blog was sold to Lineup Publishing in March 2024, which laid off all staff and hired a third reporting group.

The original iteration of Deadspin posted daily previews, recaps, and commentaries of major sports stories, as well as sports-related anecdotes, rumors, and videos. In addition to covering sports, the site wrote about the media, pop culture, and politics, and published several non-sports sub-sections, including The Concourse and the humor blog Adequate Man. Contrasting with traditional sports updates of other outlets, Deadspin was known for its irreverent, conversational tone, often injecting crude humor into its writing and taking a critical lens to the topics it covered. Over time, the site expanded into more investigative journalism and broke several stories, including the revelation of the Manti Te'o girlfriend hoax. Alumni writers of Deadspin have gone on to work for The New York Times, The Washington Post, and Sports Illustrated, and established Defector Media.

During October and November 2019, the website's entire writing and editorial staff resigned due to conflicts with G/O Media management over a directive to "stick to sports" content only. Deadspin began publishing content again in March 2020. The site suffered after the mass resignations, reportedly attracting only 10.22% of its previous readership. In March 2024, G/O Media sold Deadspin to Lineup Publishing; as a result of the sale, the site's entire staff was laid off. Since November 8, 2024, the blog is again operational with a third staff.

== History ==
Deadspin was founded in December 2005 by editor-in-chief Will Leitch, an author and at that time a founding editor of the New York City-based culture website, "The Black Table", in his New York City apartment, where he wrote 40 blog posts a day. The blog joined the Gawker Media network of websites. Leitch announced on June 5, 2008, that he would be leaving to take a position at New York magazine. He was replaced by A. J. Daulerio, former senior writer for the site. Author and journalist Drew Magary, formerly a frequent contributor to the site's comments section, joined as an editor and chief columnist in 2008.

Time magazine named the site one of the 50 coolest websites of 2006.

Deadspin was one of six websites that were purchased by Univision Communications in its acquisition of Gawker Media in August 2016. The Gizmodo Media Group (GMG) was subsequently formed to operate the properties.

The website's masthead consisted of editor-in-chief Megan Greenwell, managing editor Tom Ley, and senior editor Diana Moskovitz, along with a staff of writers and regular contributors.

=== Conflicts with G/O Media management ===
In April 2019, private equity firm Great Hill Partners purchased Gizmodo Media Group, renamed it G/O Media, and appointed Jim Spanfeller as CEO. Four months later, Greenwell resigned from Deadspin effective August 23, 2019. She said that dysfunction had been caused by corporate management. She also alleged that corporate management tried to intimidate Deadspin writers from reporting on the dysfunction and said that corporate management had undermined and been condescending to the site's senior staff.

In late October 2019, the editorial staff across several G/O Media sites, including Deadspin, posted articles acknowledging complaints from readers about advertisements that were autoplaying with audio. The Deadspin post said that the editorial staff "are as upset with the current state of our site's user experience as [readers] are" but that they could not control the "ad experience." The posts were subsequently removed by G/O Media management. The GMG union, which represents editors and writers across the G/O Media sites and is supported by Writers Guild of America, East, responded to the post removals with a statement that said, "We condemn this action in the strongest possible terms." According to The Wall Street Journal, G/O Media enabled the autoplaying ads in an attempt to fulfill the terms of an advertising deal it agreed to with Farmers Insurance Group. The companies had signed a deal worth $1 million that was planned to run from September 2019 – 2020 and required G/O Media to deliver 43.5 million impressions. However, after the first few weeks of the campaign, the G/O Media and operations teams did not think they could meet that goal and subsequently enabled the ads. Farmers ultimately backed out of the deal on October 30.

That same week, G/O Media editorial director Paul Maidment ordered Deadspin employees in a memo to discontinue any content not related to sports. He said that in order to "create as much great sports journalism" as possible, "Deadspin will write only about sports and that which is relevant to sports in some way." The GMG union called the changes in the site's content "undermin[ing] the nearly two decades of work writers have put into building a profitable brand with an enormous, dedicated readership." On October 29, following the memo, staffers filled the site's front page with non-sports stories that had been among the site's most popular in the past; by that afternoon, interim editor-in-chief Barry Petchesky was fired for "not sticking to sports."

As a result of Petchesky's firing, at least 10 employees participated in a mass resignation on October 30. Among those who left were Ley, writers Albert Burneko, Kelsey McKinney, Patrick Redford, Lauren Theisen, Chris Thompson, and Laura Wagner. Moskovitz also announced her departure, though she had given her two weeks' notice the week prior. Comments on the site were subsequently disabled. The GMG union posted a statement saying: "Today, a number of our colleagues at Deadspin resigned from their positions. From the outset, CEO Jim Spanfeller has worked to undermine a successful site by curtailing its most well-read coverage because it makes him personally uncomfortable. This is not what journalism looks like, and this is not what editorial independence looks like. 'Stick to sports' is and always been a thinly veiled euphemism for 'don't speak truth to power.' In addition to being bad business, Spanfeller's actions are morally reprehensible." On October 31, Magary and Dan McQuade announced their departures. By November 1, the entire staff of nearly 20 writers and editors had announced their resignations or already departed. U.S. Senator Bernie Sanders expressed his support for the editorial staff, tweeting, "I stand with the former @Deadspin workers who decided not to bow to the greed of private equity vultures like @JimSpanfeller. This is the kind of greed that is destroying journalism across the country, and together we are going to take them on."

Maidment resigned from G/O Media on November 5, 2019, stating that it was the "right moment" to "pursue an entrepreneurial opportunity."

On January 10, 2020, G/O Media announced its decision to move Deadspin operations from New York City to Chicago, where it would operate as part of The Onion.

On January 31, 2020, Ley and several other former writers established Unnamed Temporary Sports Blog, an interim site sponsored by Dashlane that operated exclusively over Super Bowl LIV weekend. The site reopened for the week of April 20, sponsored by a cannabis oil company. In July 2020, they subsequently announced a new subscription-based sports and culture website, Defector.

The first new content posted to the Deadspin site following the resignations appeared on March 13, 2020, as new editor-in-chief Jim Rich announced that the website was building a new team. New articles began publishing earlier than planned due to the COVID-19 pandemic.

On March 11, 2024, G/O Media CEO Jim Spanfeller told staff the site had been sold to the European startup Lineup Publishing. Spanfeller said the new owner would not be retaining any of the current staff, who were laid off as a result of the sale. He said G/O was not actively looking to sell Deadspin, but that Lineup Publishing approached the company with an attractive offer.

== Reporting ==
Deadspin broke the story of NFL quarterback Brett Favre's alleged sexual misconduct toward journalist Jenn Sterger.

Deadspin also broke the story of Sarah Phillips, a reporter hired by ESPN who lied about her identity and credentials to staffers in order to gain employment.

In 2013, Deadspin broke the news that the reported September 2012 death of the girlfriend of Notre Dame All-American linebacker Manti Te'o, which Te'o had said inspired him during the 2012 season, was apparently a hoax. Deadspin found no evidence that the girlfriend had ever existed, much less died. A 2022 documentary, Untold: The Girlfriend Who Didn't Exist, features former staffers Timothy Burke and Jack Dickey speaking about the methods Deadspin used in exposing the hoax.

Deadspin received attention for "buying" a vote for the Baseball Hall of Fame election in 2013. The site announced in late November 2013 that it had acquired a vote from a BBWAA writer which was "purchased" not through a cash payment to the writer, but instead to a charity of the writer's choice. On January 8, after the Hall of Fame voting was announced, Deadspin revealed that its voter was Miami Herald sportswriter Dan Le Batard. Le Batard was heavily criticized by fellow sportswriters for "selling" his vote. The BBWAA permanently revoked his Hall of Fame voting privileges and suspended his membership for one year.

In 2014, Deadspin provided coverage of the Gamergate controversy, "expos[ing] a shocking view of sexism and harassment in the gaming industry to the wider public", according to Salon.

On October 15, 2014, Deadspin published an article which alleged that Cory Gardner, the Republican who ran for the U.S. Senate in Colorado, had faked his high school football career. Later that day, Gardner tweeted photographic evidence of himself in his football uniform as a teenager, and the main source of the story said the report mischaracterized his comments. In response, Deadspin published an article entitled: "How Deadspin Fucked Up The Cory Gardner Story", stating: "we're sorry and embarrassed," it was "shitty" of them to have wronged Gardner, and "the only thing for us to do now is to eat shit."

After Deadspin posted an article asking readers to post proof of Ted Cruz playing basketball, Cruz responded by jokingly tweeting a picture of Duke University star Grayson Allen, which then prompted Deadspin to reply with "Go eat shit."

In July 2017, Deadspin sparked controversy when in response to Senator John McCain's brain cancer diagnosis, Deadspin's Twitter account tweeted that the website did not want to "hear another fucking word about John McCain unless he dies or does something useful for once."

In March 2018, The Concourse posted a video showcasing versions of a controversial "journalistic responsibility" promo being produced by television stations owned by Sinclair Broadcast Group, which helped bring mainstream attention to them.

Deadspin's former last post each evening (before the October staff resignations), called DUAN ("Deadspin Up All Night"), was infamous for its occasionally viral and usually wildly diverse commentaries.

Under the new staff hired in 2020, the site has occasionally drawn controversy for the quality of its reporting and editing. In 2021, critics claimed the site mishandled reporting related to a clash between Rachel Nichols and Maria Taylor at ESPN.

Later that year, the site was criticized for calling ESPN anchor Sage Steele "the Black Candace Owens." Owens, a conservative commentator, is Black, while Steele is biracial.

On January 22, 2022, Deadspin published a story criticizing then-San Francisco 49ers offensive coordinator Mike McDaniel, who is biracial and whose father is Black, as "ticking off all the boxes to be the next trendy, young, white guy who takes a head coaching position [in the NFL] before one of the many deserving Black candidates." After the article's publication, an editor's note was appended to the piece and a tweet promoting the article was deleted, but none of the copy was changed. On February 6, 2022, the Miami Dolphins announced they had hired McDaniel as head coach.

=== Chiefs blackface article ===
On November 27, 2023, Deadspin published an article written by Carron J. Phillips, centered on a photo of a boy, 9-year-old Holden Armenta, wearing a Native American war bonnet at the previous day's game between the Kansas City Chiefs and the Las Vegas Raiders at Allegiant Stadium. Half of Armenta's face was painted black, and the other half was painted red, two of the Chiefs' team colors; Phillips, based on a photo that showed only the side of Armenta's face that was painted black, falsely accused him of wearing blackface. The article was headlined "The NFL needs to speak out against the Kansas City Chiefs fan in Black face, Native headdress." In the article, Phillips wrote that Armenta had "found a way to hate Black people and the Native Americans at the same time," and accused his parents of teaching him racism. Deadspin posted the article on its X account, where it received over 18,000 replies and a Community Note explaining that it was false. Despite photographic evidence showing Armenta's entire face, Phillips stood by the article, writing in posts on X, "For the idiots in my mentions who are treating this as some harmless act because the other side of his face was painted red, I could make the argument that it makes it even worse...Y’all are the ones who hate Mexicans but wear sombreros on Cinco." The posts were later deleted.

On November 29, The Daily Beast reported that Armenta's mother, Shannon Armenta, had criticized Deadspin in a post on Facebook and revealed that Holden is himself Native American. Holden's father, Raul Armenta Jr., is a member of the Santa Ynez Band of Chumash Mission Indians, and his grandfather, Raul Armenta Sr., is a member of the tribe's Business Committee. On December 4, NewsNation reported that lawyers for Raul Armenta Jr. and Shannon Armenta had written to Deadspin demanding a retraction of Phillips' article and threatening further legal action against the site, Phillips, G/O Media, and Great Hill Partners. At some point on December 7, the original article was edited to remove photos of Holden; an editor's note was added to the article which read, in part, "Three years ago, the Chiefs banned fans from wearing headdresses in Arrowhead Stadium, as well as face painting that 'appropriates American Indian cultures and traditions.' The story’s intended focus was the NFL and its failure to extend those rules to the entire league. We regret any suggestion that we were attacking the fan or his family." The article's headline was also changed to "The NFL Must Ban Native Headdress And Culturally Insensitive Face Paint in the Stands (UPDATED)."

On February 6, 2024, Raul Armenta Jr. and Shannon Armenta filed a lawsuit for defamation against G/O Media in Delaware, where the company is incorporated. In the lawsuit, the Armentas described Phillips as "someone who makes his livelihood through vicious race-baiting," and said that the family had received "a barrage of hate," including threats against Holden's life, since the article's publication. On March 11, G/O Media CEO Jim Spanfeller announced that Deadspin had been sold to Malta-based media company Lineup Publishing, and that the site's entire staff had been laid off with immediate effect; Adweek, citing anonymous sources, reported that the controversy around Phillips' article and the lawsuit "may have helped hasten" the sale of Deadspin. On October 7, Delaware Superior Court Judge Sean Lugg denied a motion by Deadspin to dismiss the Armentas' lawsuit, ruling that the accusations in Phillips' article were "provable false assertions of fact and are therefore actionable."

The case was quietly settled at the end of 2025, with the case formally dismissed in January 2026, with neither side releasing any public statement.

== See also ==
- Defector Media
