= Miguel Gómez (photographer) =

Colombian photographer (1974–2024)

- Born: March 29, 1974; Bogotá, Colombia
- Died: November 8, 2024 (aged 50); New York City, U.S.
- Education: Jorge Tadeo Lozano University
- Known for: Photography
- Website: mgpixlab.com

Miguel Gómez (March 29, 1974 - November 8, 2024) was a Colombian-American photographer and visual artist, based in New York City, whose style was marked by/best known for his work in fine art photography, portrait, editorial and landscape photography.

Gómez worked between London and New York City.

== Early life and education ==
He completed his primary and secondary education at Colegio San Carlos, a bilingual private school which he attended from 1981 to 1992 in Bogotá, Colombia.

After graduating from high school, Gómez enrolled in the Architecture School of Bogotá's Universidad de Los Andes and eventually continued and completed his studies at Jorge Tadeo Lozano University from 1994 to 1999, earning a Professional (Bachelor of Arts) Degree in Advertising with an emphasis in Graphic Design.

While at advertising school, Gómez decided to put all his efforts into pursuing a career in photography. However, his work in the medium dates as early as 1989, when he was 15 years old. During 1991–1992 (his last two high school years), this dedication grew significantly, and he spent almost every day after school in the darkroom, processing film rolls he had shot with a complete 35mm kit.

Gomez's initial photographic interests were based on deadpan views of the street, architecture and urban landscapes. Later on, while working as an assistant photographer (while still being a university student), Gómez established direct contact with commercial photography, agencies, fashion shoots and larger productions.

In 1998, he upgraded from the smaller 35mm film format to medium format and large format, and by 2000 started working with digital photography. As a consequence of the exploration of the possibilities these formats gave, his body of work evolved and embraced broader topics.

== Career ==
Gómez's first editorial commission was for Architectural Digest Magazine / Latin American Edition. He provided work for almost every major publication in Bogotá for more than 5 years and for advertising agencies such as Lowe & Partners/SSP3, (now MullenLowe Group), Bates and Ogilvy & Mather. Subsequently his photographs were featured in some of the most important Colombian magazines: Fucsia, Cromos, SoHo (magazine), Estilo Fedco, Donjuan (magazine), Axxis, Semana, and Rolling Stone, (North Cone edition). His editorial work covered fashion, portraiture, architecture, stills and reportage.

His photography work for architect Giancarlo Mazzanti was also featured in The Phaidon Atlas of Contemporary World Architecture.

Gómez's work has also been published in Avianca's magazine, and El Tiempo.

In addition, Gómez lectured on different levels of photography at Bogotá's most important universities for 7 years. He worked for the Fine Art, Media, Graphic Design, Advertising and Engineering schools of Pontificia Universidad Javeriana, Politécnico Grancolombiano, Jorge Tadeo Lozano University, Central University and Francisco José de Caldas District University. He was also offered a place as a photography lecturer in the Fine Arts School of the Universidad de Los Andes by Carolina Franco (then dean of the Fine Arts School), shortly after having already decided to travel to the United States, the U.K. and continental Europe to focus on his personal work and expand his international experience.

Some of the editorial portrait subjects from Gómez's career ranged from Colombian ex-president Álvaro Uribe Vélez and politician and diplomat Noemí Sanín, to race car driver Juan Pablo Montoya and alternative rock band Aterciopelados.

Gómez lived and worked previously in Los Angeles, and London, England where he worked as a freelance photographer for ASOS.com. He was based in New York City and in addition to his photography career, Gómez was actively involved in artistic and curatorial projects, and in photographic education.

Gómez worked mainly with Mamiya RZ67, Sinar and Canon Inc. equipment.

== Major exhibitions ==
- London: Southbank Centre / Coin Street Festival Exhibit: "Equilibrium". 2009-2010.
- Invitation to Photographic Exhibit: Fotográfica Bogotá. May - Jun. 2009 A selection of 15 B/W Portraits by Miguel Gómez, along with work by: Bettina Rheims, Nan Goldin, Erwin Olaf, Eugenio Recuenco, Cindy Sherman, Sophie Ristelhueber, Loan Nguyen, Alexandre Orion, Chuck Close, Gottfried Helnwein, Graciela Sacco, Martin de Thurah, Olaf Breuning, Peter Beste, Robert Mapplethorpe, Tom Chambers, Alberto Korda, Arnold Newman, Bernard Silvesten, Man Ray, Graciela Iturbide.

== Awards, presentations and distinctions ==
- Featured and Showcased on Culture Trip's Website: - 7 Photographers from Bogotá to Check Out 2017.
- Nominee / "Amphibia" - Sixth Annual Black and White Awards: - The Spider Awards: 2011.
- Artwork (cover) for Thom Carter's Album -‘Son Clair’ - London Soundmap experimental audio project Released London, 2009.
- Featured and Showcased on the British Fashion Website: - "Iqons": 15 Minutes of Fame: London, 2008. / Archived: Site closed in late 2012.
- Pecha Kucha Night Bogota - Farewell Presentation: PKN Vol.IV: 2007 - Profile and Video Link
- Featured and Showcased on: - Popular de Lujo 2005-2007.
- Finalist: Photography Lecturing Contest - Universidad Nacional de Colombia: August 2004.
- Member of the Board of Directors at the Colombian Photographers Association ASOFOTO / ACF: Jun. 2002 - Dec. 2004.
- Honorary Mention - Fotomaratón - Fotomuseo: Images of the City: Oct. 2001: (Amanecer, Monserrate: Item 31 of 50): FotoMaratón. Plus: All versions of the competition
- Shared: - Cannes Young Creatives Competition / Semana - with University Creative Advertising Partner: Studio Arellano: June 1999.
