= List of men's magazines =

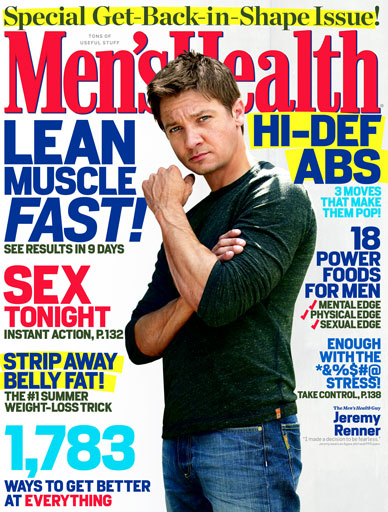
Men's Health magazine, published by Rodale, Inc. in Emmaus, Pennsylvania, was the best-selling men's magazine on American newsstands in 2006.

This is a list of men's magazines from around the world. These are magazines (periodical print publications) that have been published primarily for a readership of men.

The list has been split into subcategories according to the target audience of the magazines. This list includes adult magazines. Not included here are magazines which may happen to have, or may be assumed to have, a predominantly male audience - such as magazines focusing on cars, trains, modelbuilding and gadgets. The list excludes online publications.

== General male audience ==
These publications appeal to a broad male audience. Some skew toward men's fashion, others to health. Most are marketed to a particular age and income demographic. In the United States, some are marketed mainly to a specific ethnic group, such as African Americans or Mexicans.

=== Americas ===
Canada

- Sharp Magazine
United States
- Classic Style Magazine (defunct)
- Complex (defunct)
- Details (defunct)
- Esquire US
- GIANT (defunct)
- GQ USA
- Hustler
- Indy Men's Magazine (defunct)
- Maxim
- Men's Fitness (defunct)
- Men's Health US
- Men's Journal (defunct)
- Treats!
- Men's Vogue (defunct)
- Muscle & Fitness
- New Man (defunct)
- Oui (defunct)
- Playboy (1953–2020) (defunct)
- Penthouse (1965–2023) (defunct)
- Tiger (defunct)

=== Europe ===
United Kingdom
- Buck (defunct)
- The Chap
- Esquire UK
- FHM
- Loaded
- Lusso Magazine
- Magnate (defunct)
- Man About Town
- Men's Health UK
- Nuts (defunct)
- Sorted
- Zoo (defunct)

Others

- For Men
- Vi Menn

=== Asia ===
Japan

- Men's Non-no
- Popeye
- Weekly Asahi Geinō

India

- Man's World
- GQ India

Others

- Arrajol
- August Man Magazine
- GQ Thailand

=== Oceania ===
- Alpha (defunct)
- Chance International (defunct)
- GQ Australia
- Men's Health Australia
- Robb Report (Australia)

== Ethnic men's magazines ==
=== African American men's magazines ===
- King (US) (defunct)
- Smooth (US)

=== Latin American men's magazines ===
- Hombre
- Open Your Eyes (defunct)

== Gay male audience ==
- The Advocate
- Attitude
- AXM (defunct)
- Badi
- Bear Magazine
- bent
- Blue
- Boyz
- Butt
- DNA
- fab (defunct)
- FourTwoNine
- G Magazine (defunct)
- G-Men
- Gay Times
- Genre (defunct)
- Hello Mr. (defunct)
- Instinct
- Männer
- MyKali
- Next Magazine
- Out
- Outlooks (defunct)
- QX
- Siegessäule
- Têtu
- XY
- Zero (defunct)

== Men's lifestyle magazines ==
Men's lifestyle magazines (lad mags in the UK and specifically men's magazines in North America) were popular in the 1990 and 2000s, focusing on a mix of "sex, sport, gadgets and grooming tips". From the early 2000s, sales of these magazines declined very substantially as the internet provided the same content (and particularly more graphic pornography) for free.

=== International ===
- FHM
- Maxim
- Stuff
- Zoo Weekly (defunct)

=== Americas ===
United States
- Blender (defunct)
- King
- Mob Candy
- Open Your Eyes (defunct)
- Smooth
- Sports Illustrated Swimsuit Issue

Colombia

- Donjuan
- SoHo

Others

- H Para Hombres (Mexico)
- UMM (Canada)
- Urbe Bikini (Venezuela)

=== Europe ===
UK

- Front (defunct)
- Gear (defunct)
- Loaded
- Nuts (defunct)
- Zip Magazine (defunct)

Scandinavia

- Café (Sweden)
- Mann (Norway) (defunct)
- Slitz (Sweden) (defunct)
- Vi Menn (Norway)

=== Oceania ===
- People (Australia) (defunct)
- The Picture (Australia) (defunct)
- Ralph (Australia) (defunct)

== See also ==
- List of health and fitness magazines
- List of pornographic magazines
- List of women's magazines
- Men's adventure magazine

== General and cited references ==
- Benwell, Bethan (2003). Masculinity and men's lifestyle magazines. Oxford, UK Malden, Massachusetts, US: Blackwell Pub./Sociological Review. ISBN 9781405114639.
- Benwell, Bethan (March 2005). ""Lucky this is anonymous!" Men's magazines and ethnographies of reading: A textual culture approach" (PDF). Discourse and Society. 16 (2): 147–172. doi:10.1177/0957926505049616. hdl:1893/13065. S2CID 144963267.
- Benwell, Bethan (2007). "New sexism? Readers' responses to the use of irony in men's magazines" (PDF). Journalism Studies. 8 (4): 539–549. doi:10.1080/14616700701411797. hdl:1893/13077. S2CID 18568206.
- Benwell, Bethan (Spring 2001). "Male gossip and language play in the letters pages of men's lifestyle magazines". The Journal of Popular Culture. 34 (4): 19–33. doi:10.1111/j.0022-3840.2001.3404_19.x.
- Benwell, Bethan (July 2004). "Ironic discourse: evasive masculinity in men's lifestyle magazines". Men and Masculinities. 7 (1): 3–21. doi:10.1177/1097184X03257438. S2CID 145210684.
- Stibbe, Arran (July 2004). "Health and the social construction of masculinity in "Men's Health" magazine" (PDF). Men and Masculinities. 7 (1): 31–51. doi:10.1177/1097184X03257441. S2CID 109931551.
- Betrock, Alan (1993). Pin-up mania!: the golden age of men's magazines, 1950-1967. Brooklyn, New York: Shake Books. ISBN 9780962683350.
- Jackson, Peter; Stevenson, Nick; Brooks, Kate (2001). Making sense of men's magazines. Cambridge, UK Malden, Massachusetts: Polity Press Blackwell Publishers. ISBN 9780745621760.
- Stibbe, Arran (July 2004). "Health and the social construction of masculinity in "Men's Health" magazine" (PDF). Men and Masculinities. 7 (1): 31–51. doi:10.1177/1097184X03257441. S2CID 109931551.
