= Maxim (Australia) =

Australian magazine

MAXIM Australia
- Cover of the August 2014 issue
- Editor: Santi Pintado
- Categories: Men's
- Frequency: Monthly
- Publisher: Nuclear Media Ltd.
- First issue: August 2011
- Final issue: September 2025
- Country: Australia
- Based in: Sydney
- Language: English
- Website: maxim.com.au

MAXIM Australia was the Australian edition of the United States–based international monthly men's magazine MAXIM. It was known for its pictorials featuring popular actresses, singers, and female models. Largely covering men's lifestyle topics and popular culture, MAXIM was the only monthly men's magazine title in Australia.

== History and profile ==
Following the closure of Ralph and Alpha, Australian MAXIM was launched by Nuclear Media under editor-in-chief Santi Pintado, former editor of Ralph. The first issue was published in August 2011 featuring Jennifer Hawkins on the cover. The magazine is based in Sydney.

Maxim Australia stopped circulating in September 2025.

== MAXIM TV ==
In 2014, the series MAXIM TV launched on ONE HD based on the men's magazine, hosted by James Kerley and Lana Kington and was Co-produced by Rod Cleland and MOSMAN MEDIA A second season hosted by Kerley and Kristy Hocking began in 2018 on 7mate.

== MAXIM Australia HOT 100 ==
Each year since 2012, the Australian edition of MAXIM has released the MAXIM HOT 100. The winners and their corresponding ages and the year in which the magazine was released are listed below.

Year	Choice	Age	Notes
2012	Miranda Kerr	29	
2013	Jennifer Hawkins	30	
2014	Iggy Azalea	24	
2015	Delta Goodrem	30	
2016	Margot Robbie	26	
2017	Ruby Rose	31	
2018	Sophie Monk	39	
2019	Margot Robbie	29	
2020	Delta Goodrem	35	
2021	Ellie Cole	29	
2022	Margot Robbie	32	
2023	Margot Robbie	33	
