= Karrine Steffans =

American writer (born 1978)

- Born: August 24, 1978 (age 48); Saint Thomas, U.S. Virgin Islands
- Education: Horizon High School
- Occupations: Writer; actress; model
- Spouse: Darius McCrary (m. 2009; div. 2011)
- Partner(s): Kool G Rap (1995–1999)
- Children: 1
- Writing career
- Years active: 1996–present
- Notable work: Confessions of a Video Vixen

Karrine Steffans (born August 24, 1978 as Elisabeth Ovesen) is an American author, most notably of the Vixen series of books. She has worked as an actress and as a video vixen, appearing in more than 20 music videos. Steffans, often referred to as "Superhead," published her first book, Confessions of a Video Vixen, in 2005. In 2007 and 2008, she visited several college campuses to discuss her involvement in the hip-hop industry and its expectations of women.

== Early life ==
Steffans was born in Saint Thomas, U.S. Virgin Islands, and moved to Florida when she was 10 years old. She has written about her troubled childhood: she grew up in poverty, suffered emotional and physical abuse at the hands of an alcoholic mother and indifferent father, and was raped when she was 13. She ran away at 16, and began working as an exotic dancer. She lived on the streets for a month. She lived in New York and Arizona, and then moved to Los Angeles in 1999. She currently resides near Hollywood. When she was 17, Steffans moved in with rapper Nathaniel Wilson, better known as Kool G Rap, with whom she had a son. Their relationship was "tumultuous", and Steffans says she left for Los Angeles to protect her son after physical abuse landed her in the hospital.

== Career ==
=== Model ===
Steffans' relationship with Kool G introduced her to the growing hip hop music industry. After moving to Los Angeles, friends she had made in the industry through acquaintances of Kool G began showing her the ropes. She made her video model debut at the age of 21, appearing in Jay-Z's "Hey Papi" video in 2000. Steffans has also worked in videos with R. Kelly, LL Cool J and Mystikal. In April 2006, Steffans appeared on The Oprah Winfrey Show in a segment titled "Smart Women on 'Stupid Girls' – Guests discuss the objectification of women". Steffans discussed how she had suffered sexual abuse as a child, and how she allowed herself to be sexually exploited in order to obtain work in music videos.

In 2004, after her appearance in A Man Apart, Steffans modelled for Smooth magazine's 'Hollywood Swimsuit' issue, and appeared on its cover the following year in conjunction with the release of her first book. In 2007, Karrine Steffans appeared in an exclusive photo-layout and on the cover of King magazine.

=== Actress and rap career ===
In 2003, Steffans appeared in the action movie A Man Apart, starring Vin Diesel. In 2007, musicians Datwon Thomas and DJ Rhude released a mixtape called Freaky Flows, with a spoken word introduction and epilogue by Karrine Steffans, made available for free through King magazine.

=== Author ===
Karrine Steffans' first three books, Confessions of a Video Vixen (2005), The Vixen Diaries (2007), and The Vixen Manual: How to Find, Seduce & Keep the Man You Want (2009), have all made The New York Times Best Seller list. She dedicated her first book to her son, and she donates part of the proceeds from the book to the Boys & Girls Clubs of America. According to Essence Magazine editor Michaela Angela Davis, Steffans is reaching people "who may have dismissed earlier protests against rap's misogyny". Steffans has spoken to young women at colleges about the lesser-known dangers of the entertainment industry.

Upon publishing her cautionary memoir Confessions of a Video Vixen, Steffans departed on a promotional tour and has been interviewed by many journalists, including Bill O'Reilly, Geraldo Rivera, and Donny Deutsch. Entering The New York Times Best Seller list at number seven and peaking at number five, Confessions stayed on the list for over twenty weeks in hardcover and returned to the best seller list a year and a half later in paperback. The Vixen Diaries, published by Grand Central Publishing/Hachette Book Group USA (formerly Warner Books), entered The New York Times Best Seller's list at number six in the fall of 2007. The Vixen Manual: How to Find, Seduce & Keep the Man You Want entered the How-To/Self-Help New York Times Best Seller list in July 2009 at number seven.

Steffans started her own publishing imprint, Steffans Publishing, in 2008. She has occasionally guest-written columns for King magazine. In March 2010, Steffans announced on her website that she had signed two deals with Fox Television Studios.

In July 2012, Drink Fuck Sleep (Volume 1) was published, with Karrine Steffans as editor. The book is described by its publishers as "an anthology" that consists of "a series of essays depicting regrettable sexual experiences wherein the consumption of alcohol was involved, either before, during, or after." In February 2013, How To Make Love to a Martian was published in exclusively Kindle form. Steffans describes the book as relating the story of her "unorthodox relationship" with rapper Lil' Wayne.

In 2015, ten years after the release of her first book, Steffans published Vindicated: Confessions of a Video Vixen, Ten Years Later, with a foreword by King magazine founder Datwon Thomas. Speaking about the legacy of her output, Steffans said, "I realized recently that I'm surrounded by young women who have never had a sexual revolution. So I became almost this figure, this Joan of Arc [for them]". Around this time, Steffans had a relationship with actor Columbus Short, with whom she filed a restraining order against in 2016.

== Selected works ==
- Steffans, Karrine; Hunter, Karen (2005). Confessions of a Video Vixen. New York: Amistad. ISBN 978-0-06084-242-0.
- Steffans, Karrine (2007). The Vixen Diaries (revised ed.). New York: Grand Central Publishing. ISBN 978-0-44658-226-1.
- Steffans, Karrine (2009). The Vixen Manual: How to Find, Seduce and Keep the Man You Want. New York: Grand Central Publishing. ISBN 978-0-44658-227-8.
- Steffans, Karrine (2011). SatisFaction: Erotic Fantasies for the Advanced & Adventurous Couple. New York: Grand Central Publishing. ISBN 978-0-44655-320-9.
- Steffans, Karrine, ed. (2012). Drink, Fuck, Sleep (Volume 1). Sherman Oaks, California: Steffans Publishing. ISBN 978-0-61556-236-0.
- Steffans, Karrine (2013). How To Make Love to a Martian. Los Angeles: Steffans Publishing. ISBN 978-0-61576-890-8.
- Steffans, Karrine (2015). Vindicated: Confessions of a Video Vixen, Ten Years Later. BenBella Books. ISBN 978-1-94036-382-0.
