= Patricia Brennan =

Patricia Brennan may refer to:

- Patricia Brennan (missionary), Australian medical doctor, missionary and campaigner for the ordination of women
- Patricia Brennan (musician), Mexican-born American jazz composer and musician
- Patricia Flatley Brennan, director of the National Library of Medicine
- Patty Brennan, Colombian and American evolutionary biologist and behavioral ecologist
