= Fusion TV =

American television channel (2013–2021)

- Logo used 2018 – 2021
- Country: United States
- Broadcast area: United States
- Headquarters: Doral, Florida, U.S.

Programming
- Language: English
- Picture format: 1080i (HDTV) (Note: Downgraded to letterboxed 480i for the SDTV feed))

Ownership
- Owner: TelevisaUnivision
- Parent: Fusion Media Group (2016–2021)

History
- Launched: October 28, 2013; 13 years ago
- Replaced: ABC News Now
- Closed: December 31, 2021; 4 years ago

Fusion TV was an American pay channel owned by Univision. Originally founded as a joint venture with ABC News, it later relied in part on the resources of its parent company's news division, Noticias Univision. In addition to conventional television distribution, Fusion was streamed online and on mobile platforms to subscribers of participating cable and satellite providers.

Launched on October 28, 2013, the network's content featured news, lifestyle, pop culture, satire and entertainment aimed at English-speaking millennials, including those of a Hispanic background; the channel was Univision's first major push into English-language programming. Fusion was based in "NewsPort", an expansion of the Univision campus (formerly a freight warehouse) at 8551 NW 30th Terrace in the Miami suburb of Doral, Florida, which was shared with Noticias Univision and Univision flagship station WLTV-DT; it maintained additional studios in Los Angeles and bureaus in Mexico City, New York City, and Washington, D.C. The channel ceased operations on December 31, 2021.

== Background ==
Apart from being Univision Communications' first attempt in the world of English-language cable networks before El Rey Network, Fusion was ABC News' third attempt in the world of 24-hour cable news. In 1982, ABC News and Group W (then a division of Westinghouse) first launched a 24-hour news channel called Satellite News Channel. But due to low clearance from cable systems, both of them sold the channel after just over a year on the air to CNN (a subsidiary of Turner Broadcasting System, which has been under Time Warner's control since 1996), which used it to augment coverage of CNN's companion network, CNN Headline News. In the mid-1990s, consistent rumors of the launch of an ABC cable news channel were persistent with the launch of MSNBC and Fox News Channel, but never came to confirmed fruition, and wound down with the network's purchase by The Walt Disney Company, which instead put their efforts into building ESPN's sports news division.

Twenty-two years later, in 2004, ABC News launched ABC News Now as an early digital multicast network, which was also available through video portals such as Yahoo's. It was a lower-profile effort established for ABC News's digital side, and never expected to go beyond that platform and onto regular cable as a 24-hour news channel.

== History ==
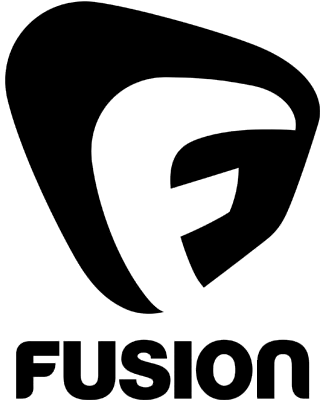
Fusion's logo from 2013 to 2018

In December 2010, the newly appointed president of Noticias Univision, Isaac Lee, announced plans to start a 24-hour English language cable news channel aimed at Latino Americans. Univision Communications would later on, in late 2011, enter into discussions with Walt Disney Company-owned ABC News about entering into a joint venture to develop the channel. The discussions bore fruit with the companies' formal announcement of the channel on May 8, 2012, initially projecting a debut during the first half of 2013 (the channel would be given its name, Fusion, in February 2013). On October 4, 2013, the company announced it had named Isaac Lee as chief executive officer to replace interim CEO Beau Ferrari.

Fusion's formal launch date and its initial programming schedule was announced on August 1, 2013. The channel formally launched on October 28, 2013, buoyed earlier in the day by a simulcast of ABC's Good Morning America and Univision's ¡Despierta América! designed to promote Fusion's launch and programming. After leading off with a three-minute musical number at 6:57 p.m. Eastern Time on October 28, 2013, Fusion began regular programming with the debut of America with Jorge Ramos.

Fusion's target audience consisted mainly of millennials (roughly the age bracket of adults 18–34), a group generally regarded as digitally fluent and normally favors social media and internet sources to add news and base opinions, usually eschewing traditional broadcast and print sources. To that end, Fusion geared its programming less towards the constant coverage of breaking news, instead emphasizing context and analysis on news and issues, along with interviews, documentaries, and long-form reports on current events, lifestyle, and pop culture. Fusion also employed an on-air blending of serious topics and discussions that is, more often than not, laced with irreverence and humor (a "common language" among millennials according to former host Alicia Menendez) that aims to reduce the air of pretense and seriousness with which other news outlets treat current topics and issues. The "fusion" of seriousness and lightheartedness has been evident in Fusion's primetime lineup: America with Jorge Ramos, in its first week, took a more conventional approach, featuring interviews with President Barack Obama and U.S. Senator Ted Cruz, while other early Fusion shows Alicia Menendez Tonight featured more personal and less serious topics, and programs including No, You Shut Up ventured towards irreverence and even satire.

Fusion was originally conceived to primarily attract a younger audience of an English-speaking Hispanic and Latino American background; about one-fifth of millennials are classified as being of Latino descent and have generally been well-acclimated with English language society in the United States, either as emigrants or as U.S. nationals by birth. After receiving some backlash during development over concerns that too much of a focus was placed on ethnicity, Fusion would broaden its scope during its development, aiming to "engage and champion a young, diverse and inclusive America," regardless of cultural or language background. Isaac Lee, who served as Fusion's CEO in addition to President of News for Univision, explained that Hispanic millennials see themselves as part of the broad American culture and that "they want to be part of the same room and part of the same conversation" as non-Hispanics.

Fusion operated out of a former warehouse in Doral, Florida (billed by staffers as the "Newsport") that is shared with Noticias Univision, WLTV-DT and WAMI-TV. Additionally some resources were also shared with ABC News and Noticias Univision (The above-mentioned interview of President Obama, conducted by ABC News correspondent Jim Avila, was one such example of that reliance.). However, the network operated separately from ABC's and Univision's news divisions, employing its own on-air talent, correspondents, management, production staff and board of directors. Univision handled programming responsibilities for Fusion, while Disney-ABC Television Group provided advertising sales and handled cable and satellite distribution for the channel. ABC News president Ben Sherwood noted that while the channel would eventually feature all original programming, repurposed content from ABC News and Univision content aired on the channel during late night time slots in its early months, along with paid programming (which has since departed the schedule completely).

In December 2015, it was reported that Disney was in talks to sell its stake in Fusion to Univision. The transaction was complete on April 21, 2016. Fusion was made the anchor of Univision's online news publications group Fusion Media, which included the likes of The Onion and The Root.

The company laid off a large portion of its workforce on November 16, 2016, ahead of the channel's anticipated reorganization in which the assets of Gizmodo Media Group and The Onion would form the new core of the station's programming.

On July 24, 2017, Fusion relaunched its article based online presence under the brand "Splinter" while things relating to the channel itself remained at Fusion.net branded as Fusion TV. The article based half of Fusion's website content switched to the Fusion.kinja.com domain in May prior to the re-branding. Splinter was later sold by Univison to G/O Media and on October 10, 2019, announced they were ceasing publication.

=== Carriage decline and closure ===
On January 10, 2020, Dish Network removed the channel from the lineup. On January 23, 2020, AT&T removed the network from the lineups of DirecTV and U-Verse TV, along with their related streaming services.

On September 2, 2020, Spectrum and legacy TWC/BHN/Charter systems removed the channel, along with El Rey Network from their channel lineup. Other providers began to remove the network throughout the remainder of 2020 and into 2021, as it was excluded from retransmission consent negotiations for the newest three-year carriage cycle for Univision-distributed networks.

Without much public notice, Univision notified their remaining carriage partners that the network would be shut down December 31, 2021, as the company resolidified their focus on Spanish-language audiences in the wake of the TelevisaUnivision merger which closed a month later. It was the second consecutive year a Univision-funded English-language channel shut down, as El Rey's wireline network was shut down exactly a year before.

== Programming ==
The initial schedule on Fusion included programs intended for a younger audience than most cable news shows attract, many of which featured the lively, irreverent approach the network originally intended to make its hallmark. It eventually removed the satirical content and by the end, most of its programming consisted of blocks of Unews.

=== Former shows ===
Program	Description
Unews	A live rolling news block of stories impacting younger and Latinx men.
Big Papi Needs a Job	Reality TV series following retired baseball player "Big Papi" David Ortiz as he attempts different jobs.
Cheddar on Fusion TV	Business, tech, entertainment and media news live from the floor of the New York Stock Exchange.
Rude Tube	British television program that covers humorous online clips presented by English comedian Alex Zane.
Strange Medicine	A medical news program hosted by Dr. Juan Rivera, Univision's Chief Medical Correspondent who trained at the prestigious Johns Hopkins Hospital.
The A.V. Club	Program highlighting topics at The A.V. Club, hosted by John Teti.
The Cannabusiness Report	Program looking at the business, facts and culture of legalized marijuana by Gonzo journalist Ryan Nerz.
In Living Color	A 1990s Fox sketch show long in syndication.
Drug Wars	A look at the elite law enforcement fighting drug trafficking.
Naked Truth	Investigative series featuring different topics per episode featuring Fusion correspondent Natasha Del Toro.
Nightline on Fusion	A Fusion version of the ABC show Nightline.
Outpost	Travel show.
Show Me Something	Jorge Ramos hits the road with politicians, business leaders and artists in search ways of seeing the world.
The Fusion Feed	Weekly program featuring a diverse set of contributors who weigh in passionately on subjects ranging from politics to pop culture.
The Traffickers	Show that looks at the black market place and smuggling across the world.

- America with Samuel Rivera - Reports, analysis, interviews, and discussions on significant news topics hosted by the Noticiero Univision anchor. Originally a daily newscast at Fusion's launch, America moved to once-weekly installments in March 2014, allowing the program and Rivera to do field reports and other long-form features.
- Back Home - A weekly documentary-style show that follows celebrity guests making voyages to their family's country of origin.
- Come Here & Say That (Formerly Alicia Menendez Tonight) - Discussions and commentaries on daily issues featuring former HuffPost Live host Alicia Menendez.
- The Chris Gethard Show – is a phone-in comedy and variety talk show created and hosted by Chris Gethard, It was initially a live show before becoming a taped series.
- The Dan Le Batard Show with Stugotz – A simulcast of the ESPN Radio program hosted by Miami Herald sportswriter Dan Le Batard (the TV simulcast moved to ESPNU after Disney sold its ownership in Fusion).
- D.N.A. – An hour-long interactive show hosted by Derrick Ashong that focused on social issues.
- Fusion Investigates - The banner name for Fusion's long-form investigative and narrative programming and the team devoted to it, emphasizing "stories that will have an impact," and topics such as the economy, immigration, injustice, and corruption featuring Mariana van Zeller.
- Fusion Live – a 1-hour daily program hosted by Mariana Atencio, Pedro Andrade, and Yannis Pappas that is what Atencio describes as "NPR meets The Daily Show," presenting news, discussions, interviews, and live performances in an informative yet edgy manner. Originally a 2-hour breakfast television show at Fusion's launch (when it went by the title The Morning Show), the program moved to a late afternoon/early evening berth in March 2014 as part of a major schedule adjustment by Fusion.
- Good Morning Today – Executive produced by former Daily Show writer/producer David Javerbaum and created by The Jim Henson Company (through its Henson Alternative banner), this 15-minute show spoofed conventional breakfast television programming, with the setting of a morning news show in an alternate universe populated by live-action personalities and computer-animated anchors. The show was filmed with the use of The Jim Henson Company's Digital Puppet Studio, a proprietary technology that enables performers to physically puppeteer and voice computer-generated characters in real time.
- Like, Share, Die – An animated sketch series created alongside Mondo Media, featuring episodes of their online web shows.
- No, You Shut Up! – Another David Javerbaum/Henson Alternative collaboration, this 25-minute combination of topical discussion and comedy starred Paul F. Tompkins and a panel of puppet commentators (played by the Miskreant Puppets from Puppet Up!).
- Open Source – A show hosted by KMEX-DT news anchor León Krauze that covers "a mix of politics, pop-culture and really weird stuff." Just as with America with Jorge Ramos, Open Source began as a nightly program before shifting to weekly installments in March 2014.
- The Soccer Gods - A weekly program that offers "an irreverent, nuanced, North American perspective" on the sport of soccer and the pomp and passion that surrounds it.
- Sports Talkers – A half-hour show hosted Rebecca Delgado Smith, Billy Scafuri and Adam Lustick that combined elements of sports talk radio and improvisational comedy.
- Unreported World - A United Kingdom import from Channel 4.
- The Young Turks – A current affairs show with progressive commentary with hosts from the online TYT Network (a one-hour show on tour ran during the 2016 presidential election).

== Key personnel ==
=== Executive leadership ===
- Isaac Lee – chief executive officer, 2013 – 2018

=== Key hires ===
Towards its one-year anniversary, a series of high-profile hires of digital-native journalists created high expectations for the young media company. NPR's David Folkenflik called Fusion "One of the most interesting experiments we've seen in television (...) since the Emergence of Fox News Channel". Those hires were later laid off or moved to Splinter as the focus of the channel changed and the website split off.

- Jane Spencer – Former editor-in-chief, Digital Platforms Now at The Guardian.
- Anna Holmes – Former editor, Digital Voices Now at First Look Media.
- Felix Salmon – Former senior editor, digital Later at Cause & Effect.
- Tim Pool – Former director of media innovation
- Dodai Stewart – Former executive director. Now editor-in-chief at Splinter News.
- Alexis Madrigal – Now with The Atlantic.

== Carriage and content distribution ==
By the time that Disney-ABC and Univision announced the channel's name – Fusion – on February 11, 2013, the channel already signed carriage agreements with major pay television providers including Verizon, Cablevision, Charter Communications, Cox Communications, AT&T U-verse and Google Fiber. Fusion replaced ABC News Now on most cable systems; that network ceased operations on October 28, 2013, the day of Fusion's debut.

The channel was primarily carried on the digital basic tiers of participating providers, and premiered to a reach of approximately 20 million homes, one-fifth of the total U.S. households with subscription television services. Fusion is currently seeking carriage on additional providers, with deals pending or not yet reached with notable providers including Comcast and Time Warner Cable. The channel was added to the Dish Network lineup after a new carriage deal was reached between Dish and Disney. On the week of September 22, 2014, Fusion was placed in test mode on DirecTV channel 342 in preparation for launch on the carrier along with sister channel the Longhorn Network. As of November 13, 2014, Longhorn Network and Fusion were removed from test mode as DirecTV and Disney/ESPN were unable to at that time reach a carriage agreement. On December 23, 2014, DirecTV announced a wide-ranging distribution agreement with Disney to carry Fusion in early 2015, The channel went live on January 21, 2015. Fusion's goal, according to Board of Directors member and ABC News president Ben Sherwood, is to reach 60 million homes within five years of its debut.

In addition to its on-air presence, all Fusion content was mirrored and available through its web and app presences.
