= Man About Town =

Man About Town may refer to:

== Film and television ==
- A Man About Town, a 1923 silent comedy starring Stan Laurel
- Man About Town (1932 film), a spy film starring Warner Baxter
- Man About Town (1939 film), a musical comedy starring Jack Benny and Dorothy Lamour
- Man About Town (1947 film) or Le silence est d'or, a film starring Maurice Chevalier
- Man About Town (2006 film), a film starring Ben Affleck
- Man About Town, a 1997 short film written by and starring Matt Gunn
- "Man About Town", a 1956 episode of Father Knows Best
- "Man About Town", a 1957 episode of The O. Henry Playhouse

== Other uses ==
- Man About Town (album), a 2016 album by Mayer Hawthorne
- Man About Town (magazine), a British men's magazine published from 1952 to 1968
- Man About Town (2000s–2010s magazine), a British style magazine for men, established in 2007
- Man About Town, a 1932 cartoon collection by William Steig
- The Man About Town, a 1923 book by A. P. Herbert
