= Semana Jr. =

Colombian children's magazine

- October 2009 issue of Semana Jr. celebrating their 10th anniversary.
- Editor-in-Chief: Natalia Borrero Morales
- Categories: Children's literature
- Frequency: Monthly
- First issue: October 1999
- Company: Publicaciones Semana S.A.
- Country: Colombia
- Based in: Bogotá, D.C.
- Language: Spanish
- Website: [www.http://semanajr.com semanajr.com]
- ISSN: 0124-5368

Semana Jr. is a Colombian-based monthly magazine geared towards children ages 6 through 12. Published since 1999, the magazine is a version of Semana, the most widely read magazine in Colombia.

The content of the magazine covers varied interests like popular children's film and games reviews, and provides emphasis on history and science articles and activities; to some degree varying between the issues, it also contains some national and international affairs news coverage redacted for a younger audience. The magazine often partners with educational institutions and organization to reach out to young readers and create interest in journalism by encouraging readers to submit their cartoons, articles, and pictures, as well as setting up interviews by children with famous celebrities and athletes.
