= Sharp (magazine) =

Canadian men's magazine

SHARP Magazine
- Cover of the May 2013 issue, featuring Robert Downey Jr.
- Editor-in-Chief: Josh Greenblatt
- Categories: Men's
- Frequency: Seven times a year
- Circulation: 840,000 (2016)
- Publisher: John McGouran
- Founded: 2008
- Company: Contempo Media Inc.
- Country: Canada
- Based in: Toronto
- Language: English
- Website: sharpmagazine.com
- ISSN: 1917-585X

SHARP is a Canadian men's lifestyle magazine published by Contempo Media Inc., a Canadian media, publishing, and content company headquartered in Toronto. SHARP magazine was launched in 2008 and is published six times per year, with two SHARP: The Book for Men special editions targeting premium and luxury consumers. Content includes fashion, travel, electronics, automobiles, food, alcohol, advice, and essays of international scope but from a Canadian perspective.

In addition to being published in Canada, SHARP was licensed for publication in Russia in 2011.
