= Classic Style Magazine =

Quarterly men's magazine

- Cover of Issue 3
- Editor: Michael Key
- Categories: Men's
- Frequency: Quarterly
- Publisher: Key Publishing Group
- Founder: Michael Key
- Founded: 2006
- Final issue: 2008
- Company: Key Publishing Group
- Country: United States
- Language: English
- Website: http://www.classicstylemag.com

Classic Style Magazine was a short-lived quarterly men's magazine, first published in early 2007, and stopped production in 2008, after five issues. The magazine was owned and operated by Michael Key, through his company, Key Publishing Group.

== See also ==
- List of men's magazines
