= Lou Harry =

American novelist

- Born: Middle Township, New Jersey, U.S.
- Education: Temple University
- Occupations: Author; journalist; playwright

Lou Harry is an Indianapolis-based author, journalist, and playwright. The editor of Quill, the magazine of the Society of Professional Journalists, he hosted the podcast Lou Harry Gets Real, which was recorded in front of a live audience. His produced plays include Going Solo or Another Song That Isn't About Danny Koppell, which premiered in 2026 at the Chatterbox Jazz Club, We Are Still Tornadoes, which premiered in August 2018 at Butler University Theatre, and Lightning and Jellyfish, which premiered in October 2014 at Theatre on the Square in Indianapolis.

== Biography ==
Born at Burdette Tomlin Memorial Hospital (since renamed as Cooper University Hospital Cape Regional) in Middle Township, New Jersey, Harry was raised in Wildwood, New Jersey, and graduated from Wildwood High School in 1982. He graduated from Temple University and shortly was writing professionally for Philadelphia and other outlets. While working at various city and regional magazines, he sidelined for a decade as a professional stand-up comic, co-ran the Philadelphia-based Comedy for Kids theater company, and began writing books.

His writing career led him to Indiana where his writing projects included the novel The High-Impact Infidelity Diet, (co-written with Eric Pfeffinger), which was released in 2005 by Random House/Three Rivers Press and optioned by Warner Bros.

Other books he has written or co-written include Warning: Don't Try This at Home, The Voodoo Kit (and its many sequels), The Encyclopedia of Guilty Pleasures, Dirty Words of Wisdom, Therapist in a Box, In the Can, Kid Culture, Creative Block, and In the Can: The Greatest Career Missteps, Sophomore Slumps, What-Were-They-Thinking Decisions and Fire-Your Agent Moves in the History of the Movies.

Other books include As Seen on TV, In the Can, Strange Philadelphia, The Game of Life and Santa Claus Conquers the Martians.

In addition, his work has appeared in more than 50 publications including The Sondheim Review, TheatreWeek, Variety, Dramatics, Men's Health, and Endless Vacation.

He edited the now-defunct Indy Men's Magazine, which he co-created. He co-edited IMM's first book, The X-Mas Men: An Eclectic Collection of Holiday Essays. Writers featured include Michael Kun, Rev. Phil Gulley, Doug Crandell, and Todd Tucker.

From 2007 to 2018 he served on the staff of the Indianapolis Business Journal as arts and entertainment editor.

His produced plays include Going Solo or Another Song That Isn't About Danny Koppell (a collaboration with singer/songwriter Cara Jean Wahlers), The Egg, Balsa Wood and Rita From Across the Street, which had its professional world premiere via American Lives Theatre in 2022. His play We Are Still Tornadoes, adapted from the novel by Michael Kun and Susan Mullen, opened the 2018/19 season for Butler University Theatre followed by an industry reading in New York featuring Lilla Crawford and Jared Goldsmith. Also in 2018, Catalyst Repertory staged his play Popular Monsters. His plays Lightning and Jellyfish and Clutter or The Moving Walkway Will Soon Be Coming to an End premiered at Theatre on the Square. The High-Impact Infidelity Diet and Beer Can Raft premiered at the Indy Fringe Festival. Midwestern Hemisphere: a suburban metaphysical comedy, co-written with Eric Pfeffinger, had its world premiere in March 2008. Staged by the Heartland Actors Repertory Theatre, it was the first full theater production ever staged in the Indianapolis Artsgarden in downtown Indy. His play The Pied Piper of Hoboken was developed in part through a grant from the Indiana Arts Commission.

His "live auction comedy" long-form improv show, Going...Going...Gone (co-created with John Thomas) was staged monthly in Indianapolis and has been offered in other cities. It features different actors at every performance playing characters at the fictional Ed's Auction House. After Ed's death, everything in the auction house must be sold and the characters do that while telling stories about the objects. The actors don't know beforehand what they will have to sell and the audience bids (and keeps) the sold objects, using play money provided with their programs.

He is a frequent contributor to Midwest Film Journal, TheatreCriticism.com, and Indianapolis Monthly.

He hosts live events including the weekly Game Night Social at the Garage Food Hall in Indy, Reel Fun Movie Trivia at Alamo Drafthouse Indianapolis, and more.
