= Fernando Tamayo Tamayo =

Colombian economist and politician

- Born: February 13, 1950
- Died: April 13, 2018 (aged 68); Bogotá, Colombia

Academic background
- Education: Jorge Tadeo Lozano University

Fernando Tamayo Tamayo (13 February 1950 – 13 April 2018) was a Colombian economist and politician.

He was raised in Paipa and attended Jorge Tadeo Lozano University. Tamayo later taught at his alma mater and Del Rosario University. He was elected to the Paipa City Council between 1974 and 1980. He then moved to Bogotá, serving as councillor between 1982 and 1994. Tamayo contested his first House of Representatives election that year as a member of the Conservative Party. After four terms as a representative, he ran for Senate in 2010. Tamayo won reelection to the Senate in 2014, but was diagnosed with cancer in September 2016, and announced that he would not seek a third senatorial term. He died in Bogotá on 13 April 2018.
