= H Para Hombres =

Mexican men's magazine

Mariana Ochoa on the cover of H Para Hombres 2009

H Para Hombres (simply known as Revista H) was a monthly Mexican men's magazine. Similar to FHM or Maxim, the magazine features sexy photos of actresses, models and singers, as well as other topics that interest men, such as sports, health and fashion. It was published by Editorial Notmusa. There was also a nude edition called H Extremo, presenting racier pictorials, sometimes with the same actress or model who posed for the regular issue.

The magazine was discontinued in 2020 due to the COVID-19 pandemic in Mexico.
