= Hombre (magazine) =

- Categories: Men's magazine
- Frequency: Bi-monthly
- Founded: 2006
- Country: USA
- Based in: New York City
- Website: http://www.hombre1.com

Hombre is the only American bilingual, upmarket national magazine targeting Latin men. The bimonthly launched in 2006. The magazine is based in New York City.

Hombre includes interviews with prominent Latin men, news features relevant to the Latin community, sports stories, fashion editorials, and photo layouts of Latin women. Lifestyle columns include sections on travel, restaurants and hotels, nightlife, as well as health and fitness. The Entertainment section has features and reviews of theater, film, music and television projects. Musical reviews focus on Latin artists. The Events section lists national and international happenings. The first woman featured in the photo layout section of Hombre was Roselyn Sanchez.

Hombre is a sponsor of Latin events throughout the United States.
