= Mob Candy =

American magazine

- First issue, July 2007
- Editor: Tyrone Christopher
- Categories: Men's magazines
- Frequency: 6 issues annual
- Founded: 2007
- First issue: July 2007
- Country: USA
- Based in: Brooklyn and Fort Lauderdale
- Language: English
- Website: http://mobcandymag.com/

Mob Candy is an American magazine promoting the Mafia lifestyle. The magazine is subtitled "The Underworld Magazine of Mafia Politics, Pleasures and Power". It is targeted towards males aged 18 to 35 years.

== Publication history ==
The idea for the magazine came from a meeting between Tyrone Christopher, a graphic designer, and Frank DiMatteo, a former magazine publisher and distributor. DiMatteo grew up in the Gallo faction of the Colombo crime family and made a lot of money in the 70s and 80s publishing porn magazines. The two developed the idea of a glossy magazine about Italian-American Mafia culture. The name of the magazine comes from a line of mafia-inspired clothing owned by the founders

DiMatteo himself claims to have been brought up "in the life", and has been quoted as saying, "When I was a young guy I ran around with some people known to have a lot of contacts, let's put it that way." his father Richard Dimatteo was bodyguard to Larry Gallo, Joe Gallo's brother, and brains of the Gallo crew.

Crime author and reputed former mobster Sonny Girard has been enlisted as one of the magazine's regular writers. He was also a consultant on such mob-related media as the film Mickey Blue Eyes.

=== Editorial direction ===
Editor-in-chief Tyrone Christopher has said that the magazine will feature talks with "legendary mafia" in prison about pop culture topics such as "what they think about Paris Hilton, hip-hop, government, Obama, a woman president." The magazine has been called the "Maxim for wiseguys". Christopher himself has described his editorial philosophy on the magazine as "if The Rat Pack were a magazine, that magazine would be Mob Candy."

=== Criticism ===
Even before the publication of its first issue, the magazine was a target for criticism, largely from the Italian American community, some of whom felt the magazine stereotyped Italian American culture, while others felt that the magazine's "Staten Island flavor" gave the New York borough a bad name.

Some also felt the magazine glorified criminality. The first issue featured a fold-out poster of John Gotti, a profile of crime boss Carlo Gambino, and a feature called "50 Years of Rats", criticizing mob informers such as Joe Valachi and "Sammy the Bull" Gravano.
