= Jorge Tadeo Lozano University =

University in Colombia

- Universidad Jorge Tadeo Lozano
- Other names: Utadeo, "La Tadeo"
- Type: Private
- Established: February 5, 1954; 72 years ago
- Academic affiliations: Universia, Asociación Colombiana de Universidades
- Principal: Cecilia Maria Velez
- Location: Carrera 4 No. 22 - 61, Bogotá, Cundinamarca, Colombia; 4.6067°N 74.0676°W
- Campus: Urban
- Colors: Blue & white
- Website: utadeo.edu.co

Jorge Tadeo Lozano University is a private university whose main campus is located in Bogotá, Colombia, with satellite campuses in Cartagena, Santa Marta and Chía. Established in 1954, the institution was named after the botanist, scientist and politician Jorge Tadeo Lozano.

The university was founded by Joaquín Molano Campuzano, Javier Pulgar Vidal and Jaime Forero Valdés at a time of great political commotion in Colombia. Their aim was to create an environment of peaceful engagement in an academic setting, based on the scientific and altruistic principles that characterized the Royal Botanical Expedition to New Granada of which Jorge Tadeo Lozano was a member, in a team of scientists led by José Celestino Mutis.

Jorge Tadeo Lozano University is a member of the Association of Colombian Universities (ASCUN), and Universia.

Among the notable architecture features of the school are an auditorium, a fine art gallery, a postgraduate studies building and a public square designed by Colombian architect Daniel Bermúdez.

The university also broadcasts cultural activities and content on Bogotá's FM radio via HJUT 106.9 FM, with Classical Music, Opera, Jazz and Rock programming.

== Notable alumni ==
Alphabetically by surname:

- Patty Brennan - evolutionary biologist
- Miguel Gómez - photographer, visual artist, graduated from the Advertising school
- Lina Marulanda - fashion model and television personality, graduated from the Advertising school
- Nadín Ospina - sculptor, graduated from the Fine Art school
- Doris Salcedo - visual artist, sculptor, graduated from the Fine Art school
- Gabriel Sierra (born 1975), Columbian visual artist, class of 2000
- Fernando Tamayo Tamayo – economist, politician, graduated from the Economic Studies school
- Carlos Vives – musician, singer, graduated from the Advertising school

== Location in Bogotá ==
The university is part of a network of downtown Bogotá universities and educational institutions as University of Los Andes and Universidad Central. Their architectural efforts have renewed this area of the city in particular.

== Gallery ==
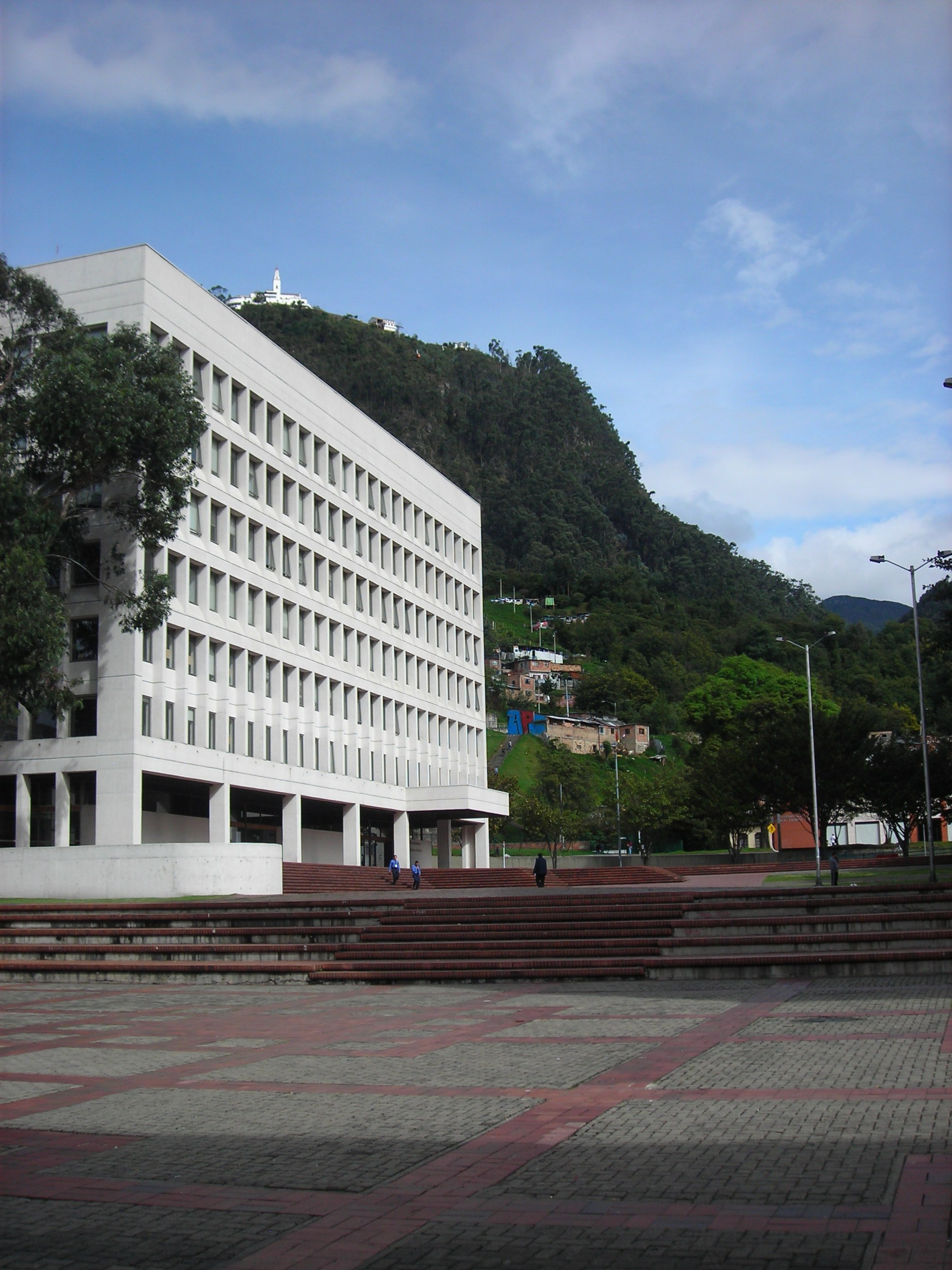
Campus Building

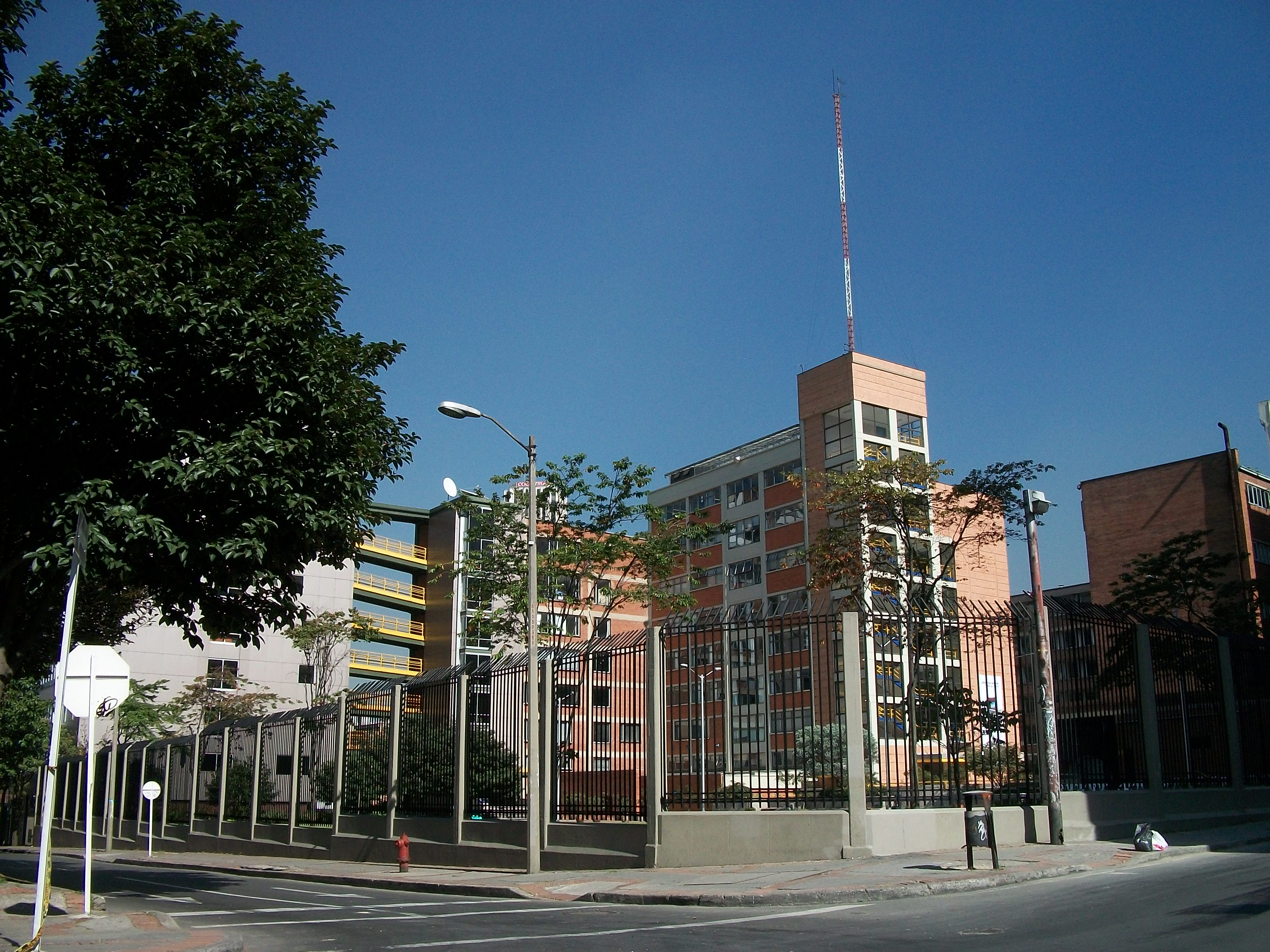
North view of the older main campus

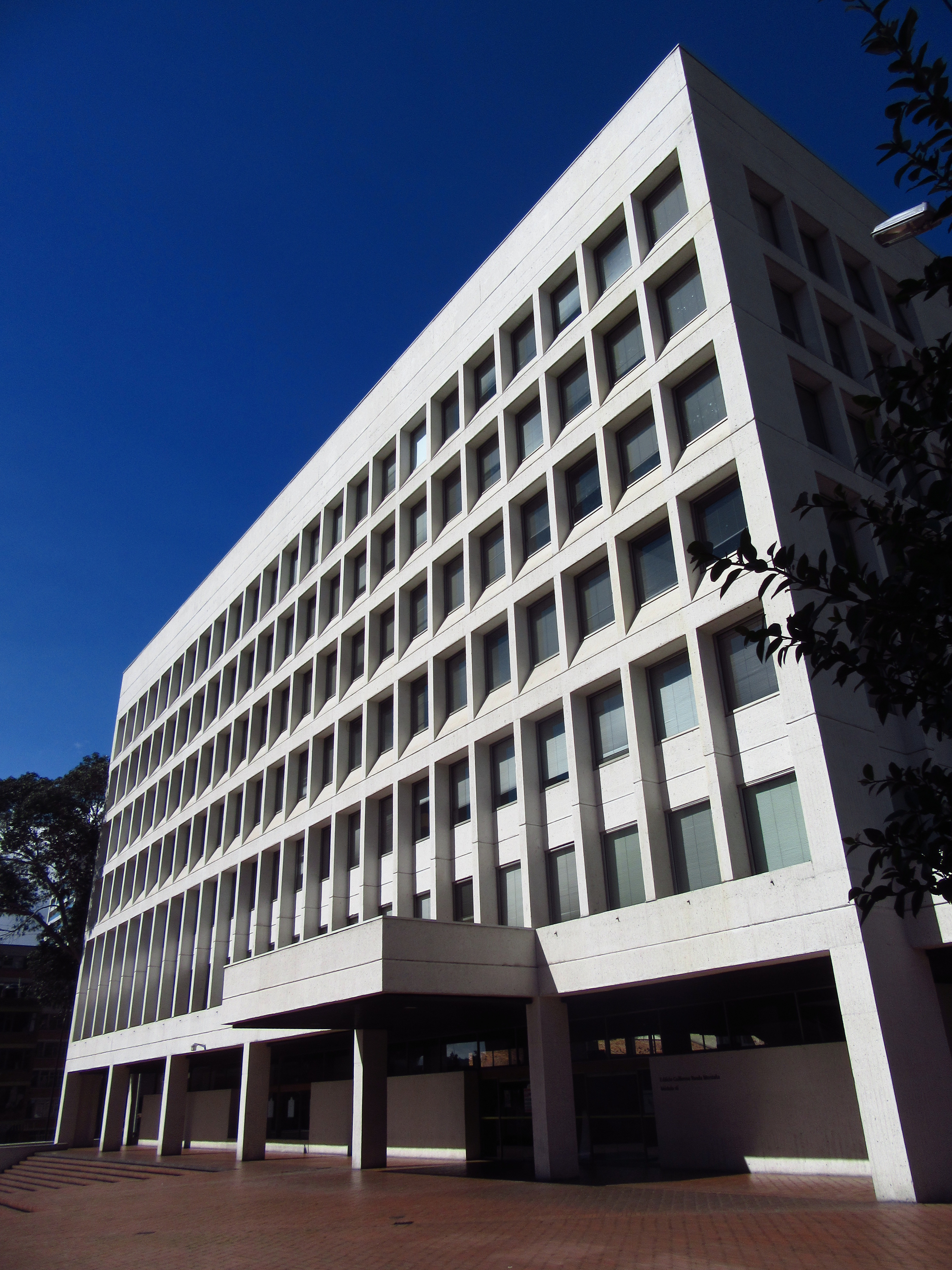
View of the university in Bogotá

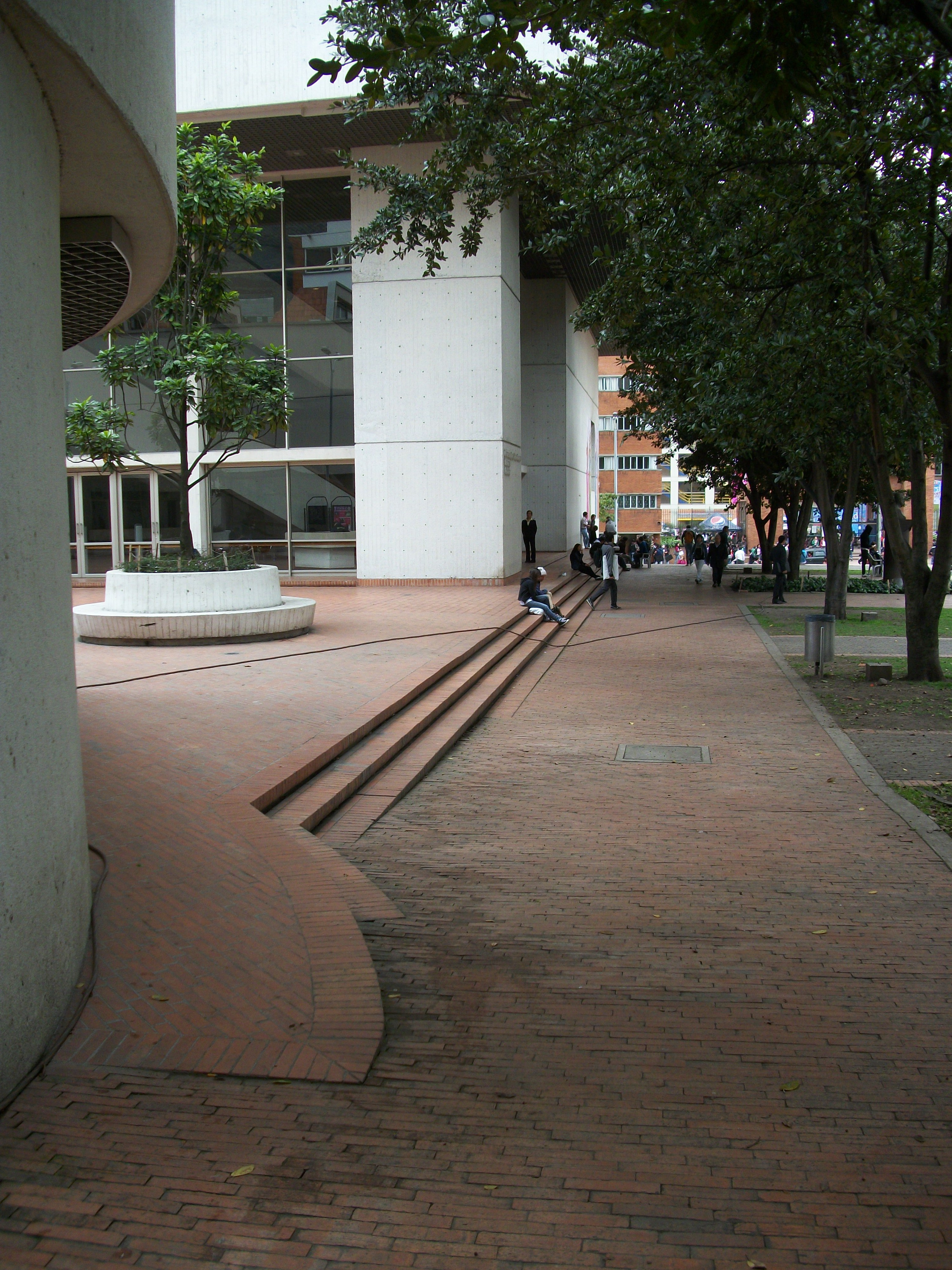
UJTL Library
