= Mami (hip-hop) =

Term for an attractive Latina woman

In hip-hop music, the term mami refers to an attractive Latina woman, typically of Puerto Rican or Dominican descent. There is also the emergence of the mami video vixen, who is the glamorized, hypersexual stereotype of an attractive Latina woman that is seen in rap videos. The image of mami that is the most popular in rap culture is the butta pecan mami, a term coined by Raquel Z. Rivera, which refers to a Latina woman who has light golden colored skin and "good" (European-type) hair.

The mami shares qualities with the hypersexual stereotype of black women, but her skin color and hair type put her in a higher position in the Eurocentric desired hierarchy. The mami that appears in mainstream rappers videos are specifically referred to by origin, which was generally Puerto Rican (but now also refers to women of Dominican descent), when the mami fetish of the 1990s took off. The term mami is not only used in hip-hop but in general conversation by the general population. The dictionary maintained by the Academy of Puerto Rican Spanish (Academia Puertorriqueña de la Lengua Española) states that the term is used to refer to one's mother, one's girlfriend or concubine, a beautiful woman, or even to a young girl.

== Emergence of the mami figure in rap music ==
In the late 1990s, there was an emergence of a romanticization of Latino stereotypes and usage of Spanish language in American rap music. From this trend came the view of Latinos, in particular women, as exotic version of the black counterparts, with a much more sexualized way of being. The use of the term mami in songs such as Diddy's song "Senorita"

Mami ven aqui, I wanna be your
Papi chulo can't you see? mi amor
Baby I need you conmigo
Your style is my steelo te necesito aqui
Te necesito yo a ti, te amo
Baby come to me (2x)

brought attention to the term as well as who it would represent in the media. There was also an awareness made to different types of mamis. The two distinct mami identities that emerged from these applications of stereotypes and Spanish language are the tropicalized mami and the butta pecan mami. The tropicalized mami is one that is an exotic, lighter-skinned version of black womanhood. The butta pecan mami is more in reference to a specific skin color (e.g. the color of butter pecan-flavored desserts).

== Critique of mami figure in hip-hop ==
Within hip-hop, women who are involved are portrayed as objects or only as good as how they work the sexual aspect of their identity, both of which lead to hyper-sexualization. There has been a history of, in the last 15 years, women who have been elevated to a higher status within hip-hop, through the usage of sexuality and sexualization of themselves. In regards to Latinas in the hip-hop community, the objectification of body parts through song lyrics, such as referring to a woman's "chocha", or vagina or vulva or pussy in "It's All About the Benjamins" by Puff Daddy, as well as the focus on the butt of Latinas, as referenced in "The Motto" by Drake has been a part of exposing mainstream media to the mami figure in hip-hop.

The women that are representing this image, such as Jennifer Lopez, also represent successes in the Latin community. The identities of the "successful" Latina and the mami Latina are ones that have been presented together, and have been critiqued for having been shown that way. This representation of Latina women as the mami figure is not broad enough and does not show the full spectrum of Latina women. Thus, it confines Latina women to one stereotypical and unachievable beauty standard. Recently, there has been a call to take a critical look at how the Latin community, in particular Latinas, are represented in mainstream media via their communities and public figures.

== Popular mami figures in mainstream media ==
In mainstream media, some of the women who fall under the category of mami are Jennifer Lopez and Angie Martinez. While Martinez transgresses different categories across Latina and Black representations of women in rap, she is credited to be the original butta pecan mami. Jennifer Lopez also falls into the mami category due to her light golden skin and European-type hair. Twin singing duo Nina Sky also fits under the category of mami, in their appearance and in how they are represented through music collaborations, such as with artist N.O.R.E. in the music video for "Oye Mi Canto".

=== Angie Martinez ===
Angie Martinez is called the "Butta Pecan Rican". or the original butta pecan mami She was a female MC that received a large amount of media attention through her music, but primarily through her position as a radio host on New York City's Hot 97 radio station.

=== Jennifer Lopez ===
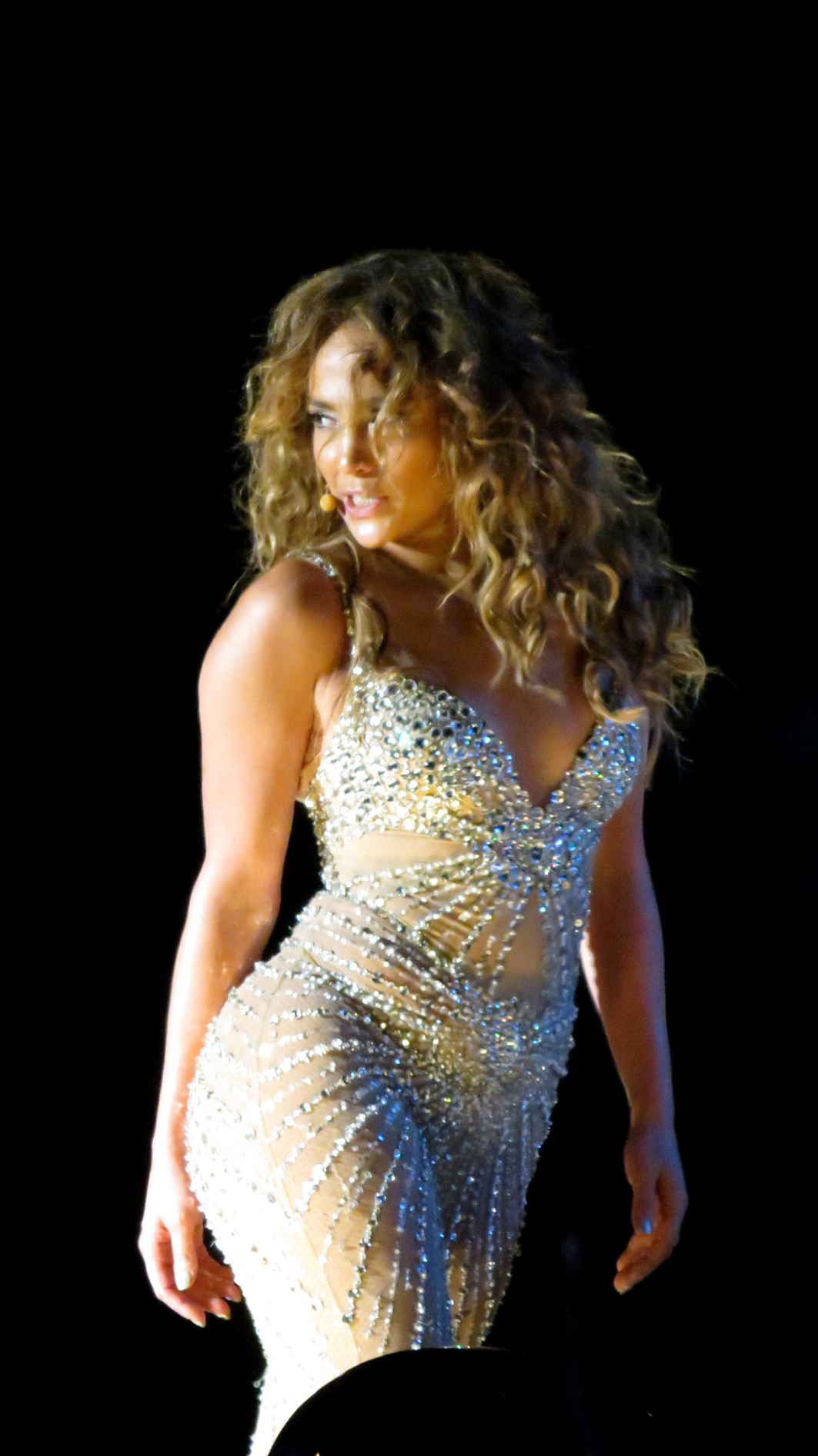
Lopez at the Pop Music Festival in São Paulo, 2012

When she came to the height of her career in the late 1990s, Jennifer Lopez was the highest paid Latina actress in Hollywood, as well as an icon of Latina womanhood. As her career progressed and she entered the music industry, there was a focus on her figure that was notable in her songs (Ex: "On the Floor", "Booty", "Dance Again"). One specific aspect of the mami identity that gets focused on in mainstream media are the bodies of mamis, in particular the "booty". Jennifer Lopez is well known in the hip-hop community for her exceptional figure. Due to her "black" body, "good" hair and lighter skin, her Latina identity and figure is desired by many. Male rap artists, such as Diddy, have referred to Lopez's butt in part of their lyrics. For example, in the song "Big Ole Butt", Diddy (at the time, Puff Daddy) raps

She had the kind of booty that I'd like to get in ... I scooped this beauty, like a big game hunter ... I put her big booty on the zebra skin rug

Recently, this is most visible in the music video for her song "Booty". The conversation and fixation on the "booty" is one that is very much associated with the mami identity in contemporary times, which further dehumanizes women associated with the mami identity. For example, when Lopez appears in public, the fixation on her butt becomes the sole focus of attention, due to its difference from white-identified bodies, as it is a "stereotypical Latina butt" that is eroticized and fetishized.

== See also ==
- Video vixen
- Misogyny in rap music
- Race and sexuality#Latin American women
- Stereotypes of Hispanic and Latino Americans in the United States#Stereotypes of Hispanic and Latina women
