= Urban Male Magazine =

Canadian men's magazine

- Cover of UMM's Spring 2007 issue, featuring Leah Miller
- Editor: Abbis Mahmoud
- Categories: Men's magazine
- Frequency: Bimonthly
- Founded: 1998
- Final issue: 2013
- Country: Canada
- Based in: Ottawa
- Website: http://www.umm.ca
- ISSN: 1480-9230

Urban Male Magazine (a.k.a. UMM) was a Canadian men's interest magazine created and operated by Abbis Mahmoud, an Ontario entrepreneur who also operated several nightclubs like Lobby, Mansion, Tila Tequila, Buddha Bar, Tequila Jacks and the Brunswick House. The magazine was launched in 1998 and published its last issue in 2013.

== See also ==
- List of men's magazines
