= Tiger (magazine) =

American men's magazine

- The first issue of Tiger, May 1956
- Editor-in-chief: G. George Fox, Jr.
- Categories: Men's magazines
- Frequency: Bi-monthly
- Publisher: Reynard Press
- First issue: May 1956
- Country: United States
- Based in: Chicago, Illinois
- Language: English

Tiger was an American men's magazine that featured photographs of pin-up girls as well as journalism and fiction. It was founded in Chicago in 1956 by G. George Fox, Jr. and published by Reynard Press into the mid-1960s. The first issue was Vol. 1 No. 1 dated May 1956.

Tiger was printed bi-monthly and circulated throughout the United States by paid subscription with the banner proclaiming "Every Man A Tiger" and featuring articles on music, sports cars, books, arts and antiques for men, along with a pin-up centerfold girl called "Miss Tiger" and a cartoon section called the "Tiger's Den."

The Historical section in each issue was dedicated to a "Tiger of the Past" highlighting well-known military figures such as James Forrestal, George S. Patton, George Armstrong Custer, and Napoleon Bonaparte, as well as essays including "The Trial of William Penn" and "Love Letters of Henry VIII". In keeping with that theme, Tiger also created an Arts & Antiques for Men section with articles on the Winchester rifle and the Colt revolver. With wit and sophistication, Tiger delivered articles in its Humor section such as "Confessions of an Airline Stewardess" and "How to Make Out at a Ski-Resort."

Timely and of the era, the Feature section on music highlighted the jazz scene and showcased up-and-coming artists in the music industry. The December 1956 (Vol. I, No. 3) issue contained an original article and photographs on a piece about a young country boy who was a rising national idol named Elvis Presley. The article on Elvis contains an interview by Tiger with some of Elvis Presley's early childhood friends as well as his manager in 1955, Bob Neal, and his bass player, Bill Black.

Ever aware of the larger social context of putting out a magazine with partial nudity in the early 1950s, publisher G. George Fox, Jr. wrote in that same issue about his vision of the magazine saying, "Tiger is like no other magazine in America. It is a new concept. Tiger is not a nudist magazine. It is a magazine for men of destiny--TIGERS."
