= Sorted (magazine) =

Christian publication

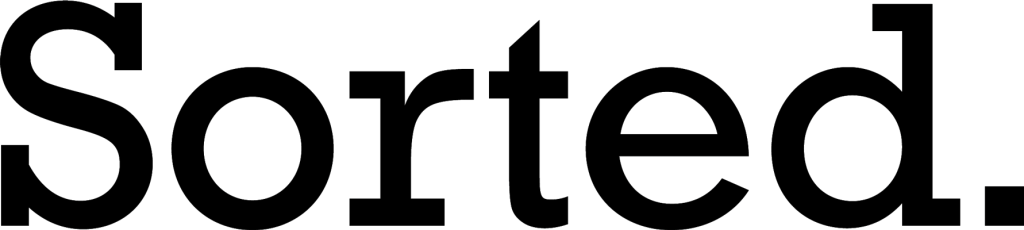
- Editor: Steve Legg
- Categories: Men's
- Frequency: Bi-monthly
- Format: A4
- Publisher: Son Christian Media Limited (SCM)
- Total circulation (2013): 33,824
- Founder: Steve Legg (2007)
- Founded: 2007 (under S. Legg)
- Based in: West Sussex, United Kingdom
- Language: English
- Website: sortedmag.com

Sorted is a bi-monthly magazine under the name Sorted. It is a Christian publication, but is written with the intent of interesting readers of any faith.
