= Video vixen =

Female model who appears in hip-hop videos and performances

A video vixen (also referred to as a hip-hop honey or video girl) is a woman who models and appears in hip-hop-oriented music videos. The concept peaked in popularity from the 1990s to the early 2010s. Video vixens are often aspiring actors, singers, dancers, or professional models. Artists and vixens have been criticized for allegedly contributing to the social degradation of women of color.

== History ==
The video vixen is believed to have arrived around the late 1980s when hip-hop was becoming popular as its own genre in the music industry. At this time, women were used to create appeal in music videos while in the background. It was not until the late 1990s, when the women came to the center of many videos. Some argue that the concept of the video vixen is a continuation of the Jezebel stereotype, portraying women as sexually promiscuous. Some of the most notable video vixens of the 2000s are Melyssa Ford, Karrine Steffans, and Vida Guerra. Melyssa Ford appeared in many music videos such as Jay-Z and UGK's "Big Pimpin'", Sisqó’s "Thong Song", and Usher’s song "Yeah!", and went on to have a career in film and television. Karrine Steffans, also known by her birth name Elisabeth Ovesen or nickname Superhead, appeared in multiple music videos for artists such as Jay-Z, LL Cool J, Ja Rule and many more in the early 2000's. Her first appearance was "Hey Papi" by JAY-Z, before she started appearing in films such as A Man Apart. Vida Guerra earned her fame from her lingerie spread in FHM in 2002. She also named model of the year she also starred in many different music videos such as Shake Ya Tailfeather’ ‘The New Workout Plan’ Obsession.

The role of video vixens in culture has been seen as controversial in recent years. Various academics have expressed concern over the subordinate, submissive, and sexual roles video vixens embody. Signs of male power and the use of derogatory language (i.e.,"bitch", "slut") by artists may contribute to the narrative that women are the inferior sex.

In 2004, Nelly's video for his song "Tip Drill" came under particular criticism for its depiction and sexual objectification of women. While some pointed out that the women who appeared in Nelly's video voluntarily chose to participate, others insisted that male rappers continue to sexually objectify hip-hop models.

In 2005, former video vixen Karrine Steffans released her best-selling memoir Confessions of a Video Vixen, in which she depicts the degradation of women in the world of hip-hop. Steffans shared her personal experience as a self-proclaimed vixen and with its intense culture. Other video vixens disagree with her account, explaining that her experience does not reflect the realities for many successful video vixens. Some video vixens report glamorous experiences in return for their work, who were sometimes paid comparably to other famous artists. Another video vixen, Candace Smith, said in an XXL interview, "What I've seen on [hip-hop music video] sets is complete degradation."

== Female rappers as video vixens ==
Women or female rappers such as Lil' Kim and Trina have been criticized by T. Denean Sharpley-Whiting who called them a "peculiar place of cultural antipathy".

Female rappers who have shown themselves off as "video vixens" include Nicki Minaj, Trina, Eve, Rasheeda, Foxy Brown, Remy Ma, Da Brat, Jacki-O, Shawnna, Gangsta Boo, LoLa Monroe, Diamond from the hip-hop group Crime Mob, and many others.

Some argue that these artists are empowered by their sexuality and reclaim their own individuality and self. For instance, Minaj is outspoken when it comes to empowering herself and other women and uses her body with the intent of overcoming male expression of female sexuality, using the catchphrase "it's Barbie, bitch!" to assert herself. Nicki Minaj's Anaconda music video is an example of female artists reclaiming their sexuality and power, while sampling Sir Mix-A-Lot's "Baby Got Back" and rapping over it with more empowered verses on femininity than the original.

== Effect on Black women ==
The topic of video vixens has created a lot of debate on the representation of Black women, such as author Faatimah Soloman's argument that it has contributed to the hyper-sexualization of black women. She explains in her article "The Exploitation Of Women Of Color In Music Videos Needs To End" how black women are deemed sexual beings due to their physical features. Video vixens are believed to be the reinforcement of these negative stereotypes placed upon black women. They are often referred to as stereotypical tropes because of their glamorization of embodying the stereotypes typically placed on women of color. She expands her argument by mentioning how these stereotypes lead to exclusion of Black women in relation to their "social and intellectual contributions", often because they are only praised for their bodies.

This idea also correlates with Nicole Heller's explanation of Objectification theory and one- dimensional womanhood. These theories define the portrayal of black women in hip-hop as it aims to separate the female body from her personality in order to focus on just her body. Heller mentions how Nelly swiping a card through the rear end of a vixen in his Tip Drill music video visually represents the ideology of the Black woman's body being a commodity. The subculture of the video vixen represents black women and women of color as objects that can literally be bought with a credit card instead of human beings. Author Amanda Rodriguez however does mention how these women were considered to be a "luxury commodity". This means that the artists and labels gave them a glamorized experience in return for their work. It was temporary for most but for the vixens who became famous they truly were able to get paid like the artist.

The video vixen is criticized for having a negative effect on women, as they are believed to set unrealistic beauty standards, and could have created the need to change themselves in order to fit said standards.

Black women in hip hop music videos are often portrayed as the "jezebel" stereotype but presenting them as light skinned and thinner.

== See also ==
- Misogyny in rap music
- Mami (hip-hop)
- Sexuality in music videos
- Stereotypes of African Americans
- Empowerment
- Women's empowerment
- Hip-hop
- Black women in the American music industry
- List of models in music videos
- Intersectionality
- Stereotypes of Hispanic and Latino Americans in the United States
