= Buck (magazine) =

British men's magazine

- Editor: Steve Doyle
- Categories: Men's magazine
- Frequency: Monthly
- Publisher: BUCK Publishing Ltd
- First issue: 30 October 2008
- Final issue: 5 January 2011
- Company: BUCK Publishing Ltd
- Country: United Kingdom
- Based in: London
- Language: English

Buck was a monthly men's magazine based in London, the United Kingdom, and available internationally, focusing on fashion, design and food. It was launched on 30 October 2008 as an independent title edited by Steve Doyle. The magazine was part of the Buck Publishing Ltd. Buck ceased publication on 5 January 2011.
