= SoHo (magazine) =

Colombian magazine

- Front cover of SoHo, featuring actress Cristina Umaña
- Editor-in-Chief: Daniel Samper Ospina
- Categories: Adult magazine
- Frequency: Bimonthly
- Publisher: Publicaciones Semana S.A.
- First issue: 10 August 1999
- Country: Colombia
- Based in: Bogota, D.C.
- Language: Colombian Spanish
- Website: www.soho.com.co
- ISSN: 0124-1400

SoHo is a Colombian-based men's magazine founded in 1999 by Isaac Lee and others. In addition to Colombia, it is distributed in Ecuador, Panama, Mexico, Argentina, Costa Rica and Peru. It is the second largest magazine by circulation in Colombia after TVyNovelas.

The magazine is known for its nude and partially nude cover photos of models, actresses, and women in Colombian public life, and like some other Latin American men's magazines, also for the contributions of notable writers and wide range of article topics. This often puts it in the same market segment as Playboy or Maxim. SoHo was published on a monthly basis until 2019 when its frequency switched to bimonthly.

== See also ==
- Donjuan (magazine)
