= Confessions of a Video Vixen =

Memoir by Karrine Steffans

- First edition
- Author: Karrine Steffans
- Language: English
- Genre: Autobiographical Memoir
- Publisher: HarperCollins
- Publication date: July 1, 2005
- Publication place: United States
- Media type: Print Hardcover
- Pages: 205 pp (first edition, hardcover)
- ISBN: 978-0-06-084242-0
- Followed by: The Vixen Diaries

Confessions of a Video Vixen is a memoir written by Karrine Steffans which details the first 25 years of her life. Part tell-all covering her sexual liaisons with music industry personalities and professional athletes, and part cautionary tale about the dangers of the otherwise romanticized hip-hop music industry, it caused considerable controversy in some circles.

== Summary ==
Confessions of a Video Vixen recounts Steffans' life from her troubled girlhood living in poverty in St. Thomas, through abuse, drugs, rape, and living as a teenage runaway who turns to stripping and hip hop modeling to support herself and, later, her young son.

Originally published in 2005 by Amistad, an imprint of HarperCollins Publishers, the book was immediately a New York Times bestseller. (The 2006 paperback edition includes bonus material, and also made the NYT bestseller list.) The book created a stir when it went on sale because of Steffans' allegations of abuse at the hands of her then-husband rapper, Kool G Rap and her claims that she had sexual relationships with numerous famous music stars and athletes, including Jay-Z, Ja Rule, Bobby Brown, Dr. Dre, DMX, Xzibit, Diddy, Usher, Shaquille O'Neal and Irv Gotti.

== Contents ==
- No Shame in My Game
- The Sins of the Mother
- Flower Off the Bloom
- The Great Escape
- Breaking Away
- Pain Is Love
- Around the Block
