= August Man =

Magazine in Singapore

Augustman
- Actor Adrien Brody on the cover of Augustman, July 2012
- Categories: Men's magazine
- Frequency: Main edition — monthly Special editions/supplements: MVMT (watch edition) — yearly Leading Force (entrepreneur supplement) — yearly
- Founded: Singapore edition — Since 2006 Malaysia edition — Since 2008
- First issue: September. 2006
- Company: BurdaLuxury
- Country: Singapore & Malaysia
- Website: www.augustman.com
- ISSN: 1985-5737 (print); 2737-5277 (web)

Augustman is a men's luxury lifestyle publication, based in Singapore, which was launched in September 2006. It focuses on fashion, design, travel, art, architecture, food, sports, health, business, books, music, film, motoring and watches. The actors Ken Watanabe, Francis Ng and Daniel Dae Kim, the Japanese soccer star Hidetoshi Nakata and the chef/author/TV presenter Anthony Bourdain have appeared on its cover. The magazine also has franchises in Malaysia and Indonesia. Farhan Shah was appointed Editor-in-Chief for Singapore and Malaysia in 2024.

Augustman is published by BurdaLuxury, a subsidiary of the German media conglomerate Hubert Burda Media.
