= Mann (magazine) =

Men's magazine in Oslo, Norway (1996–2015)

- Categories: Men's
- Frequency: Monthly
- Founded: 1996
- Final issue: November 2015
- Country: Norway
- Based in: Oslo
- Language: Norwegian

Mann (English: man) was a Norwegian monthly men's magazine published in Oslo, Norway. The magazine was in circulation in the period 1996–2015.

== History and profile ==
Mann was established in 1996. The target group was men aged between 20 and 40. It contained feature articles, as well as material on fashion, movies, music and technology. The editor-in-chief of the monthly was Knut Christian Moeng. It was owned by Hjemmet Mortensen AS, and its publisher was Egmont Hjemmet Mortensen. As of 2010 the company described the readers of Mann as the modern, confident, and active men.

Mann was the second best-selling men's magazine in Norway in 2003 with a circulation of 16,000 copies. Its circulation was 16,662 copies in 2008.

In 2014 Mann was named as the magazine of the year by Norwegian Media Business Association. However, the magazine ceased publication in November 2015, with the last issue appearing on 30 November.
