= Magnate (magazine) =

English free men's lifestyle publication

- Categories: Men's (Entertainment, Fashion, London, Sport, Technology, Business)
- Frequency: Digital
- Publisher: Magnate
- First issue: December 2012
- Final issue: 2016
- Country: United Kingdom
- Language: English
- Website: www.magnate.co

Magnate was a free men's lifestyle publication. It was published between 2012 and 2016.

== History and profile ==
Originally a print publication, the magazine launched on 12 December 2012. The launch edition of the magazine was distributed on 14 December 2012 throughout London's Kings Cross, Victoria, Liverpool Street and Paddington Railway stations and throughout office locations in Central London.

In mid-2013 it was announced that Magnate would be distributed exclusively to distribution stands in the capital, replacing all train station distribution.

The publication launched with a cover-interview with Virgin founder Sir Richard Branson, speaking about Virgin Galactic. The headline of the cover read "Branson on Mars". Other cover-stars have included cast member of E4's Made in Chelsea Jamie Laing and British rapper Wretch 32.

Magnate published a number of interviews, including with Boris Johnson, SB.TV founder Jamal Edwards, Matt Cardle and Jonathan Kite. The magazine folded in 2016.
