= Man About Town (2000s–2010s magazine) =

British men's style magazine

- Editorial Director: Huw Gwyther
- Editor-in-Chief: Damian Foxe
- Editor: Andrew Wright
- Categories: Men's
- Frequency: Bi-annually
- Publisher: Visual Talent Ltd.
- Founder: Huw Gwyther
- First issue: 2007
- Country: United Kingdom
- Based in: London, UK
- Website: manabouttown.tv

Man About Town is a British style magazine for men, established in 2007. It is based in London and published in a bi-annual print edition, aimed at affluent 30 to 45-year-old "alpha males".

Man About Town's founder and editorial director is Huw Gwyther and it is owned by his holding company, Visual Talent. The magazine was established with financial backing from British entrepreneur and businessman Peter Jones.

The magazine launched a Chinese edition in 2024.
