= Fucsia =

Colombian fashion magazine

- Front cover of issue 106 of Fucsia featuring model and actress Norma Nivia.
- Editor-in-Chief: Mónica Jaramillo
- Categories: Fashion magazine
- Frequency: Monthly
- Founded: 2004
- Company: Publicaciones Semana S.A.
- Country: Colombia
- Based in: Bogotá, D.C.
- Language: Spanish
- ISSN: 0124-857X

Fucsia (Spanish: Fuchsia) is a Colombian-based monthly magazine. It is the leading women's fashion magazine in Colombia. The magazine was launched in 2004 and is the Colombian edition of an Ecuadorian magazine with the same name. It is owned by the Publicaciones Semana S.A. As of 2014 Lila Ochoa was the director of the magazine.
