= Alpha (Australian magazine) =

Australian magazine

- Cover of June 2009 issue with Phil Hughes
- Categories: Men's
- Frequency: Monthly
- Publisher: News Magazines
- Total circulation: 65,000 (2011)
- Founded: 2005
- Final issue: 2011
- Company: News Corporation
- Country: Australia
- Language: English

Alpha was a monthly men's magazine published in Australia between 2005 and 2011. At one point it was the "biggest-selling men's magazine in Australian publishing history".

== History and profile ==
Alpha was published by News Magazines and was established in 2005. The parent company was News Corporation. The magazine was published on a monthly basis and covered articles about men's lifestyle and sports. In 2008 the magazine was redesigned. It reached a peak circulation of 113,000 in 2009, but this had fallen to 65,000 when the magazine was closed in 2011.
