= Repurposing (broadcasting) =

Repurposing refers to a television industry practice in which content providers negotiate deals that allow a series to earn additional revenue during its original run. This is made possible by airing the series multiple times on the broadcast network which licensed it, or airing it concurrently on a cable network. As a result, the window between original run and syndication is shortened dramatically. Repurposing was the first significant adaptation of industry distribution practice since the advent of cable.

Repurposing shortened the window to a matter of days between original run and syndication. Broadcast and cable developed repurposing pacts usually produced by studios also owned by broadcast networks or its conglomerate. Cable programmers hoped to increase audiences and awareness.

An early example of repurposing is the financing deal made between NBC and the United States cable channel, giving USA rights to air “Law & Order: Special Victims Unit” within two weeks of its broadcast airing.

Increases in license payments decreases initial risk for production companies by supplying additional revenue that helps to finance expensive projects. However, abandoning traditional conventions of exclusivity rights to a series may also lead to diminished profits due to over-saturation of the market. Nonetheless, media analysts have produced data that suggests series availability in any form of syndication negatively affects the audience size of the original run airing.

Repurposing has caused concern for a number of industry professionals, due to the role of conglomerated ownership and deregulatory policies of eliminating Financial Interest and Syndication Rules (fin-syn). Yet “double-runs” of a series on its own network has become a common practice, especially for cable networks, and is considered a significant change in the established procedures of broadcasters.

Once the television and broadcasting companies adapted to cable, it was said that the practice of original run repurposing marked the first significant adjustment to distribution practices beginning in 1999. Some will argue that the role of conglomerated ownership actually caused concern as networks announced repurposing arrangements that actually favored products from commonly owned studios.

== History ==
In the late 1990s and early 2000s multiple mergers and acquisitions of major media companies brought about the practice of recycling programming, or better known as repurposing. Broadcast and cable networks were becoming co-owners and their interests also became interrelated. Thus, the opportunity to swap programming between the conglomerates arose.

Perhaps, the first instances of repurposing can be located within cable as programmers have aired programs across co-owned stables of channels. A number of digital cable programming services kept costs low by filling their schedules with almost entirely familiar material. For example, Discovery Communications has re-exploited its library of science, nature, exploration, and history programming since it launched eight digital channels in 1996–97. Likewise, A&E Networks stocked its Biography and History International channels with previously aired A&E and History Channel programming.

== See also ==
- Repurposing

== Bibliography ==
- Chris, Cynthia (2006). "Can You Repeat That? Patterns of Media Ownership and the 'Repurposing' Trend". The Communication Review. 9: 63–84. doi:10.1080/10714420500500943. S2CID 145520637.
- Lotz, Amanda D. (2007). The Television Will be Revolutionized. New York: New York University Press. ISBN 978-0-8147-5220-3.
