= Smooth (magazine) =

American men's magazine

- Dominican model Rosa Acosta on the back cover of Smooth magazine in 2009.
- Categories: Men's magazine
- Frequency: Bi-monthly
- Founded: 2002
- Country: United States
- Website: www.smoothmag.com

Smooth is a bi-monthly magazine, published by Sandra Vasceannie geared toward young urban men that includes a mix of news, entertainment, urban fashion, music, movies, books, sports reporting, as well as feature articles on the hottest stars in black entertainment.

== History and profile ==
Smooth was established by Sandra Vasceannie in 2002. The magazine covers feature photos of women from around the world. Smooth also provides readers with coverage of new gadgets, cars, video games, politics, technology and sex.

Vasceannie also publishes a spin-off magazine: Smooth Girl, which is a showcase for the kind of pin-up models featured in Smooth.
