= Men and Masculinities =

- Discipline: Men's studies
- Language: English
- Edited by: Kristen Barber, Tristan Bridges, and Joseph D. Nelson

Publication details
- History: 1998-present
- Publisher: SAGE Publications
- Frequency: Quarterly
- Impact factor: 1.863 (2017)

Standard abbreviations
- ISO 4: Men Masculinities

Indexing
- ISSN: 1097-184X (print); 1552-6828 (web)
- LCCN: 98659253
- OCLC no.: 321242407

Links
- Journal homepage; Online access; Online archive

Men and Masculinities is a quarterly peer-reviewed academic journal covering men's studies. It was established in 1998 and is published by SAGE Publications. The Co-Editors are Drs Kristen Barber, Tristan Bridges, and Joseph D. Nelson.

== Abstracting and indexing ==
The journal is abstracted and indexed in Scopus and the Social Sciences Citation Index. According to the Journal Citation Reports, the journal has a 2017 impact factor of 1.863, ranking it 35th out of 146 journals in the category "Sociology".
