= Isaac Lee =

Colombian journalist and media executive (b. 1971)

Isaac Lee Possin
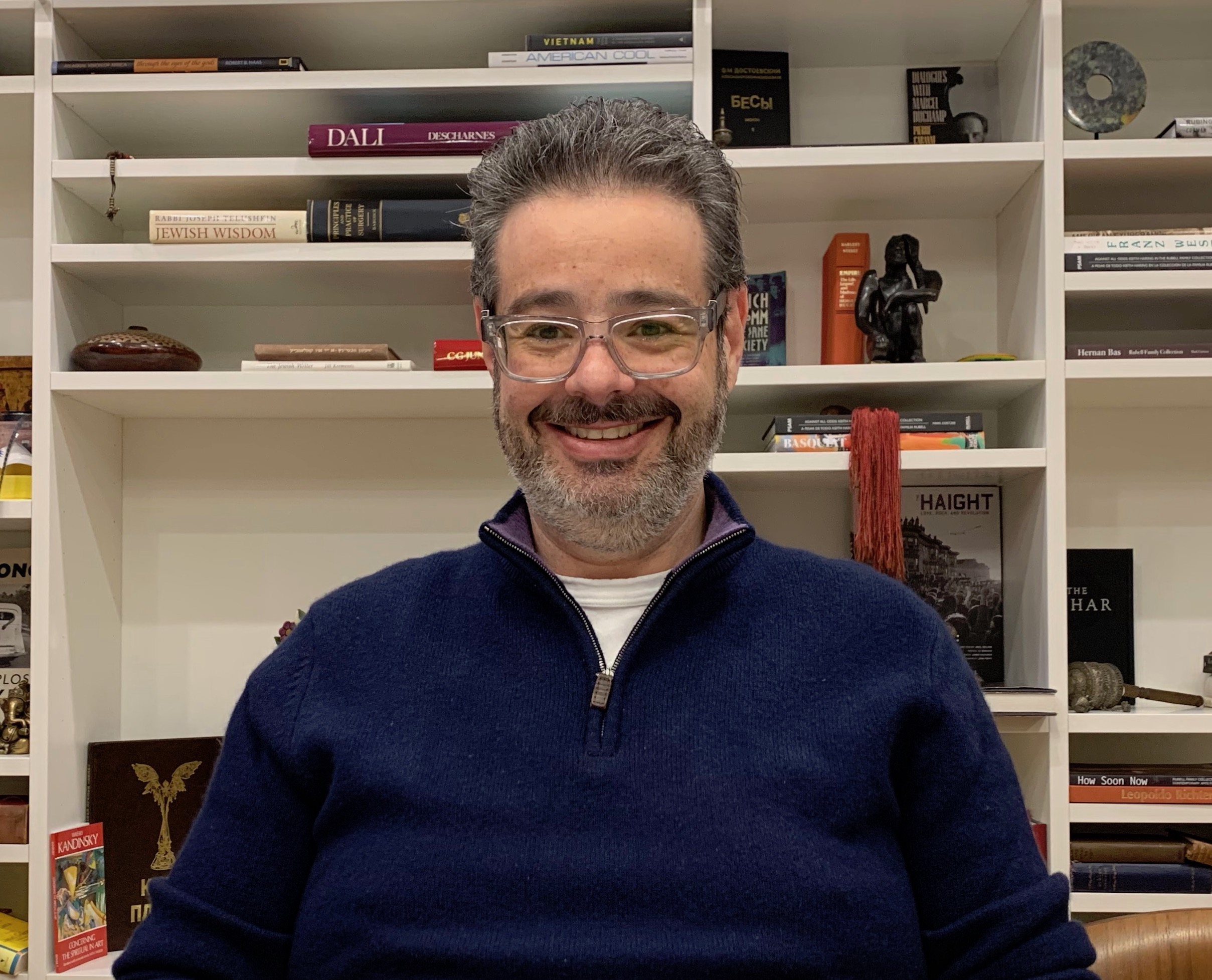
- Isaac Lee Possin - Los Angeles, CA - April 1, 2019
- Born: Isaac Lee Possin; January 5, 1971 (age 55); Bogotá, Colombia
- Occupations: Chairman and CEO of Hybe Americas
- Organization: Hybe
- Known for: Former: Chairman of HYBE Latin America, Founder and CEO of EXILE Content, Chief Content Officer of Univision and Televisa; Chief News, Entertainment & Digital Officer of Univision; Editor-in-chief of Revista Semana; Co-founder of Fusion; President of News for Univision; Executive producer for Science Fair documentary
- Television: El Chapo, Science Fair

Isaac Lee Possin (born 1971) is a Colombian journalist, media executive, entrepreneur, and film and television producer. He is the chairman and chief executive officer of Hybe Americas, a subsidiary of Hybe, which oversees multiple labels and entertainment companies, including Hybe Latin America (which includes S1ENTO Records, Docemil Music, and Zarpazo Entertainment), Quality Control Music (QC), Big Machine Label Group (BMLG), and SB Projects.

Lee previously served as chairman of Hybe Latin America and as chairman and chief executive officer of Exile Content Studio, a media company focused on developing premium original content for audiences in the United States and Latin America.

He also served as chief content officer for Univision Communications and Televisa, one of the world's largest Spanish-language media conglomerates. Lee founded StoryHouse Entertainment, a Los Angeles–based scripted content development unit of Univision, which produced television series such as El Chapo (Netflix), as well as Outpost (HBO), and the documentary features Residente and Hate Rising.

Lee was born in Bogotá, Colombia, to Jewish immigrants.

== Career ==
When Lee was 23, he reported that Colombia's then president Ernesto Samper had received funding from the Cali Cartel. Lee was fired immediately afterward.

At the age of 25, Lee was appointed editor of Cromos. At 26, he was named editor-in-chief of the Colombian magazine Semana. During his tenure at Semana, the magazine became a publishing house with several titles and digital properties. The magazine was crucial in several of Colombia's most important political junctures. A 1997 cover story forced two Colombian cabinet ministers to resign shortly after. Semana also covered political corruption, guerrillas, the military and paramilitaries, narco-traffickers and the peace process.

=== PODER Magazine ===
Lee founded and was the editor-in-chief of PODER Magazine, a pan-regional magazine for the business elite with special editions for the US Hispanic market, Mexico, Colombia, Chile, Venezuela and Peru with a total circulation of over half a million copies. The magazine was later sold to Televisa and other investors.

=== Univision ===
On December 9, 2010 Univision announced the appointment of Lee as President of News.

Shortly after joining Univision, Lee announced he was working on the launch of a 24-hour cable news channel in English; the new channel was officially announced in May 2012 as a joint venture between The Walt Disney Company and Univision. In February 2013, both networks announced the new channel would be called Fusion.

Two new departments within news were created in 2011: an Investigative Unit led by Gerardo Reyes and a Documentary Unit led by Juan Rendón. The Documentary Unit later became StoryHouse a content development and production venture producing original content for UCI's portfolio of owned networks as well as third party networks and platforms.

Under Lee's tenure, Univision News has attained several recognitions for journalistic excellence such as the 2012 Peabody and IRE Awards for its "Fast and Furious" investigation, three Emmy's for outstanding investigative reporting, outstanding newsmagazine and outstanding breaking news coverage and two Gracie awards, and the Cronkite Award for Excellence in Political Journalism.

In February 2015, as part of a reorganization of Univision's digital operation, Lee's role was expanded to lead Digital for all of Univision as President of Digital. Shortly after, under Lee's leadership, Univision announced the acquisition of African-American news site The Root.

In November 2015 Lee was named to the newly created position of chief news and digital officer, with additional responsibilities over multicultural and music and maintaining oversight of the news and digital divisions.

=== Exile Content Studio ===
In 2018, Lee co-founded Exile Content Studio with several fellow former colleagues. Exile was acquired by Candle Media in 2022, with Lee continuing to lead the subsidiary.

== Organizations and Boards ==
- Frmr. Board of Directors Associated Press
- Board of advisors of the University of Chicago Institute of Politics
- Journalism advisory board of ProPublica.
- International Advisory Board of the Committee to protect journalists.
- Hirshhorn Museum
- Frmr. Boardmember Legendary Pictures
- Board of Directors Ualá

Lee is also a member of the IAPA, the NAHJ, the Foro Iberoamérica Presided by Ricardo Lagos and Carlos Fuentes and the Council on Foreign Relations.

== Projects ==
=== Film ===
- Paraiso Travel (2008) He was a producer of feature film "Paraíso Travel", an immigration story based on a novel of acclaimed writer Jorge Franco.
- When lambs become lions (2019) Lee was the executive producer for this feature film where a small-time ivory dealer fights to stay on top while forces mobilize to destroy his trade. When he turns to his younger cousin, a conflicted wildlife ranger who hasn't been paid in months, they both see a possible lifeline.

=== TV ===
- El Chapo (2017) Produced TV Series for Univision and Netflix about El Chapo's life in crime, from his lowly beginnings in the Guadalajara Cartel in the 1980s through his rise to power—and eventual fall—as the leader of the Sinaloa Cartel.
- Colombia Hostage Rescue (2010) In 2010 he co-produced his first documentary "Colombia Hostage Rescue" for National Geographic TV which aired in 13 countries.
- Operación Jaque He also co-produced with Televisión Española an International Emmy Award nominated TV mini-series about Operación Jaque.
- Who Killed Malcolm X 6 part investigative follows activist and investigative journalist Abdur-Rahman Muhammad as he embarks on a complex mission seeking truth about the assassination of the African American Leader Malcolm X.
- TrumpLand Fusion teams up with “Kill All Normies” author Angela Nagle to examine the social and political forces which have emboldened white nationalists in the age of Trump, in this follow-up to the emmy-nominated: The Naked Truth-Trumpland.

=== Other projects ===
- Mars 2030 VR A virtual reality exploration of Mars with a realistic future habitat on the surface of the red planet. The simulation includes a dig into the history of the planet's landmarks in immersive 3D. Developed in collaboration with NASA and MIT.

== Personal life ==
Lee is openly gay.
