= Indy Men's Magazine =

American men's magazine

Indy Men's Magazine was a 50,000 circulation glossy magazine that covered sports, business, travel, health, food, drink and more for Indianapolis and beyond. The magazine was based in Indianapolis, Indiana. It existed between 2002 and 2007.

== History and profile ==
Founded in 2002 by Todd Tobias (son of former Eli Lilly and Company CEO Randall L. Tobias), the editor of Indy Men's Magazine was Lou Harry. Among contributors were such notables as novelist Michael Kun, Esquire magazine writer Tom Chiarella, fiction writers Dan Barden, David Gerrold and William F. Nolan, Indy car driver Arie Luyendyk and "teletherapist" Dr. Will Miller. Its May 2003 issue featured an original cover by artist Peter Max. The magazine was part of Table Moose Media LLC. It was published monthly and was distributed free of charge. In 2004 Timothy S. Durham invested in the magazine.

It featured lengthy interviews with such notables as Larry Bird, Karl Malden, NPR's Steve Inskeep and Tony Dungy.

It focused on a wide variety of topics including parenting, family relationships, fashion advice for the average guy, current events in sports, and consumer information. It rarely had articles that were patently sexual. It also published original fiction in every issue. Around the time of the publication of the Swimsuit Issue by Sports Illustrated it featured a parody, for example, one year it featured the "Earmuff Issue" with models in bikinis wearing earmuffs. The final issue was May 2007.
