= King (magazine) =

Monthly men's magazine

- Rosa Acosta on the cover of the Winter 2010 issue of King
- Categories: African-American men's magazine
- Frequency: Quarterly
- Founded: 2002
- Final issue: 2009; 17 years ago
- Company: Harris Publications
- Country: United States
- Website: king-mag.com

King is a website geared toward African-American and urban male audiences. It features articles about hip-hop and R&B as well as sports and fashion. The magazine is published by Townsquare Media and was a spinoff from XXL. The magazine was started in 2002. It ceased publication on March 31, 2009, citing failing ad sales as a result of the poor economy and plans to release monthly installments soon. It resumed publication, this time as a quarterly magazine, in late 2009. It was later suspended again, and the website was sold by Harris Publications to Townsquare Media in 2014.

King magazine is mainly characterized by its lavish photoshoots, which usually feature scantily clad women, often complete with an interview from the featured model. The subjects of these shoots range from professional models such as Melyssa Ford and Toccara Jones to well-known musicians and actresses, including Trina, Keyshia Cole and Elise Neal. It also features interviews with rappers. The magazine almost exclusively uses pictures from its photoshoots as the cover of the magazine. The Lycos 50 Daily Report noted the magazine received more online searches than Newsweek or Reader's Digest.
