= Patty Brennan =

Colombian American biologist

Patricia Brennan
- Education: Universidad Jorge Tadeo Lozano (BSc); Cornell University (PhD)
- Awards: National Science Foundation CAREER Award (2021)
- Scientific career
- Fields: Evolutionary biology; behavioral ecology
- Workplaces: Yale University; University of Sheffield; University of Massachusetts Amherst; Mount Holyoke College
- Doctoral advisor: Stephen Emlen; Paul Sherman
- Other academic advisors: Richard Prum; Tim Birkhead
- Website: http://www.pattybrennan.com/

Patricia "Patty" Brennan is a Colombian and American evolutionary biologist and behavioral ecologist. She is a professor of biology at Mount Holyoke College, and her research focuses on sexual selection, sexual conflict, and genital coevolution in vertebrates.

Brennan's work on the genital morphology of waterfowl, particularly her research on duck penises and her discovery of variations in duck vaginas, has received extensive press coverage in publications like The New York Times, The Guardian, National Geographic, and Scientific American. Her work on snake and dolphin clitorises has been featured in publications such as The Atlantic, Smithsonian Magazine, New Scientist, and The Washington Post. She is an advocate for basic science, as well as for further research into vertebrate vaginas.

== Early life and education ==
Brennan was born in Bogotá, Colombia. She completed her Bachelor of Science in marine biology at the Universidad de Bogotá Jorge Tadeo Lozano in 1994. In 2005, she received her Doctor of Philosophy in Neurobiology and Behavior from Cornell University, where she studied the reproductive biology of the great tinamou at the La Selva Biological Station. While conducting field research, she observed a corkscrew-shaped tinamou penis and wrote a post-doctoral project on bird genitalia after identifying a lack of research on the subject.

== Career ==
From 2005 to 2008, Brennan held a joint postdoctoral appointment at the University of Sheffield and Yale University, where she continued her research on the great tinamou and begin studying duck genitalia with Richard Prum and Tim Birkhead. After she received funding from the National Science Foundation to study duck penises, she was attacked by right-wing media for what was characterized as "wasteful" government spending. In response, she defended her work and the broader importance of basic research in the online magazine Slate and in the journal BioScience, and she began campaigning to support other scientists who dealt with similar attacks. She worked at Yale until 2009, after which she joined the University of Massachusetts Amherst as a research professor. Brennan joined the biological sciences faculty at Mount Holyoke College in 2015. In 2021, she received a CAREER Award from the National Science Foundation to study reproductive structures in snakes. In 2022, Brennan was elected as a Fellow of the American Association for the Advancement of Science for her contributions to biological sciences.

== External media ==
- In 2007, Brennan was featured in a New York Times article about her discoveries concerning the co-evolution of duck genitalia.
- In 2012, Brennan made an appearance in a PBS miniseries on sexual selection in the episode "What Males Will Do".
- In 2017, Brennan was featured in the XX Files video series by Science.
