= Semana =

Colombian news magazine

- 31 July 2010 front cover of issue 1474 of Semana featuring President Álvaro Uribe
- Director: Vicky Davila
- Editor-in-chief: Rodrigo Pardo Garcia-Pena
- Managing editor: Luz María Sierra Lopera
- Categories: News magazine
- Frequency: Weekly
- Format: A4
- Founder: Alberto Lleras Camargo
- First issue: 1946; 80 years ago
- Company: Grupo Publicaciones Semana
- Country: Colombia
- Based in: Bogotá
- Language: Spanish
- Website: www.semana.com
- ISSN: 0124-5473
- OCLC: 7475329

Semana (Spanish: Week) is a weekly magazine in Colombia.

== History ==
Semana was founded in 1946 by Alberto Lleras Camargo (who would become president of Colombia in 1958) and folded in 1961. It was relaunched by journalist Felipe López Caballero in 1983.

== Development ==
Felipe López Caballero, the person who restarted the magazine, took two earlier Colombian magazines as models. One was Camargo's Semana; the other was es:Alternativa, a left-wing weekly published by Enrique Santos and Gabriel García Márquez. The foreign magazines that he strove to imitate were Time and Newsweek.

Recalling the prestige that had been enjoyed by Lleras's magazine, López asked for, and was given, permission to use the same name.

The first issue came out on 12 May 1982. Its cover story was about terrorism.

Some of Semana's most important reporting has been about Pablo Escobar, the drug trafficking kingpin. In the 1980s, López was one of the two "big whistleblowers and critics" of drug trafficking. Since then, however, the magazine has become less exclusively political.

=== Proceso 8000 ===
Semana's coverage of Proceso 8000, the unofficial name of the legal investigation of accusations that Ernesto Samper's 1994 presidential campaign was partially funded with drug money, was the high point of the magazine's influence. Yet while the magazine covered Samper's activities with brutal honesty, López never fell out personally with Samper. Once he invited Samper and radio journalist Julio Sánchez Cristo, a fierce Samper critic, to lunch in hopes of making peace between them. Samper told López "you have been very harsh [duro]," and Sanchez injected that López had been harsh out of conviction, while he (Sanchez) had done it for money.

== Recent years ==
In recent years, Semana has been critical of the administration of Álvaro Uribe Vélez and has also taken on Colombian guerrilla and paramilitary groups. In May 2009, Semana opposed a possible second re-election of Uribe, arguing that "a third term ... would have serious institutional repercussions" and that keeping Uribe in power would only aggravate the "erosion of separation of powers that has taken place during these seven years." While acknowledging that "the popularity of the President ... is undeniable and probably deserved," Semana concluded that a third term for Uribe would, on the whole, be inadvisable.

On the occasion of its 30th anniversary in 2012, Semana was described as "one of the major and largest publications in the Americas" by Finanzas.com, which observed that its history had been "tied up with the most important events in Colombia" and that it had "recorded our country's most significant successes." Although there had been great changes in Colombia, the magazine's principles had "not changed in these thirty years."

=== Attempt on Calderon ===
In May 2013, Ricardo Calderon, the prize-winning investigative editor of Semana, was surprised by gunmen, who shot "five bullets into his car ", but he escaped without injury. The Associated Press noted that at the time of the murder attempt Calderon had been working on an investigative series about "the scandalously luxurious life of military officers jailed for crimes including murder and crimes against humanity at Tolemaida army base." Although a great many local journalists in Colombia have been murdered over the last few decades, this was, according to the Associated Press, "the first attempt on the life of a Semana journalist in the magazine's 30 years and it sent shock waves through the news media and human rights communities because of Calderon's stature."

On October 9th, 2020 Revista Semana withdrew the possibility of writing opinions at the end of each article, canceling the possibility of feedback on them.

== Honors and awards ==
Semana won the Premio Rey de España two years in a row, in 2007 and 2008. The 2007 award acknowledged the magazine's 25 years of investigative journalism. In 2008, the magazine won the award for a series of articles that uncovered the strong ties between political leaders and illegal right-wing paramilitary groups. The awards jury praised the magazine's "tireless research" and described their work as "a moral call to Colombia and the world."

The magazine's website has won several national and international awards, including the Círculo de Periodistas de Bogotá, Premio Rey de España, and Premio de la Sociedad Interamericana de Prensa. It has twice been a finalist for the Premio Iberoamericano de Periodismo Cemex-Fnpi. In 2007, Semana.com won the Premio de la Sociedad Interamericana de Prensa for Internet news coverage. The prize was awarded for "La muerte de Carlos Castaño." In the same year, Semana won honorable mention in the category of human rights for "Torturas en el Ejército" and was a finalist in the opinion category.

In 2013, Ricardo Calderón of Semana, José Navia of SoHo, and Semana.com all won prizes from the Círculo de Periodistas de Bogotá. Semana.com won for "Cerro Matoso: mina rica, pueblo pobre" ("Rich Mine, Poor People") published in August 2012.

Semana, which has won several international prizes and has more than a million readers, is considered required reading for Colombia's political, economic, and cultural elite. "In the history of journalism in Colombia," reads a profile of López by a Colombian writer, "there is a 'before Semana' and an 'after Semana,' because, in effect, before May 1982 such a thing didn't exist. ... the press in this country was an extension of the political parties." The same profile notes that "at least 80 percent of all the political scandals that have occurred in Colombia in the last 30 years have been exposed by Semana." The Washington Post, The New York Times and The Economist have all called Semana the best magazine in Latin America.

Over time, the magazine Semana developed into Publicaciones Semana, a magazine group which publishes several other major periodicals in Colombia and neighboring countries. Dinero is Colombia's major economics and business magazine; SoHo is its most successful men's magazine; Fucsia is a women's magazine; Jet Set covers celebrity news; Semana Jr. is for children; Blog is for teenagers; and Arcadia is a cultural review. Each of these magazines has its own website: Dinero.com; Soho.com.co; Jetset.com.co; Revistaarcadia.com; Revistafucsia.com, and Blog.com.co. In addition, Publicaciones Semana runs the website Planb.com.co, a comprehensive online guide to entertainment and culture.

Semana's foreign periodicals include SoHo Ecuador, which began publication in 2002; SoHo Costa Rica, which was started in 2006; and Fucsia Ecuador, which has been published since 2004.

The website Semana.com offers all the contents of the magazine Semana and also provides exclusive coverage of political and social developments. It is the second most visited website in Colombia.

On Thursdays and Fridays, the TV channel Cable Noticias runs a current-events program called Debates Semana, run by Publicaciones Semana.

Semana's notable former columnists include Héctor Abad Faciolince, Rafael Nieto, María Isabel Rueda, Hernando Gómez Buendía, and Alfredo Rangel.

== Leadership ==
The editor-in-chief of Semana is Cristina Castro.

Semana was directed by Mauricio Vargas between 1983 and 1997, by Isaac Lee Possin between 1997 and 2000, Alejandro Santos between 2000 and 2020. Vicky Dávila is its director since November 10, 2020.

The general director of the company that publishes it, Publicaciones Semana, is Elena Mesa Zuleta; Its previous directors were Mauricio Vargas (1983 – 1997), Isaac Lee (1997–2000), Alejandro Santos (2000 – 2020) and Vicky Dávila (2020 - present). The director of Semana.com is Armando Neira.

== See also ==
- El Mundo
- El Espectador
- El Colombiano
