= Donjuan (magazine) =

Colombian men's magazine

- Front cover of issue 47 of Donjuan featuring model and actress Natalia Durán.
- Director: María Elvira Arango (2006-present)
- Managing Editor: Fernando Gómez Echeverry
- Categories: Lads mag
- Frequency: Monthly
- First issue: 18 August 2006
- Company: Casa Editorial El Tiempo S.A.
- Country: Colombia
- Based in: Bogotá, D.C.
- Language: Spanish
- Website: www.revistadonjuan.com
- ISSN: 1909-3179

Donjuan (Spanish: Don Juan) is a Colombian monthly lads mag and known for its pictorials featuring popular actresses, singers, and female models, sometimes pictured dressed, often pictured scantily dressed but not fully nude.

== See also ==
- SoHo (magazine)
