= Jim Rich =

American journalist

James Rich (born 1971 or 1972) is an American journalist and newspaper editor. Originally known for his sports coverage with the New York Post, Rich has served twice as editor-in-chief of New York's Daily News, also editing The Huffington Post and later the sports website Deadspin on two occasions.

== Early life and education ==
James Rich was raised in Buchanan in Westchester County, New York. His father worked as a mechanics foreman for the Cortlandt Sanitation Department.

He studied briefly at Westchester Community College and then in Florida. He returned to Westchester to complete a communications degree.

== Career ==
Following his degree, Rich worked at a regional weekly newspaper in Eastchester. He then worked at the New Britain Herald. In 2000, Rich began covering sports for the New York Post.

=== Daily News ===
In 2004, Rich began working at New York's Daily News as the deputy sports editor. During the NFL regular season, he wrote a weekly betting column. When Colin Myler took over as editor of the Daily News in 2012, Rich was promoted to executive editor and began focusing on the paper's online output.

In September 2015, it was announced that Rich would be taking over as editor of the paper. The Daily News had recently been through an aborted sale and a series of layoffs, with Jonathan Mahler describing it as a "battered symbol of the diminished state of America’s newspapers". Its distribution had fallen to 234,000 on weekdays, compared to 500,000 five years before. In taking the position, Rich vowed to continue Myler's focus on creating digital media with a more national and populist partisan approach.

Beginning his editorship in October 2015, his early efforts saw the paper praised for its political front-page headlines by commentators like Lawrence O'Donnell and Katrina vanden Heuvel. Cover images criticising Ted Cruz, Donald Trump and Sarah Palin were among those to go viral on social media. The paper's online viewership increased during this period, from 132.5 million global views in October to 149.6 million in January 2016.

While at the Daily News, Rich oversaw a joint investigation between Sarah Ryley and ProPublica into decades-old laws which allowed the NYPD to force people from their homes and businesses without warning. The investigation saw the introduction of the Nuisance Abatement Fairness Act by the New York City Council and the journalists involved later received the 2017 Pulitzer Prize for Public Service journalism.

In October 2016, Rich left the Daily News and was replaced with Arthur Browne. The decision came as a shock to those at the paper. Rich had apparently been told by management to lessen the criticism of Republican presidential candidate Donald Trump in the lead up to the 2016 election on November 8. In fact, Rich had an opportunity to publish a story on Trump's tax returns, but was beaten to the punch by the NY Times. Rich later defended his criticism of Trump voters and argued against those criticising the media, writing that "none of us should apologize for exposing ― in the loudest, most passionate way ― hatred, oppression and unfairness".

=== The Huffington Post ===
Rich later began working as editor of The Huffington Post (later Huffpost). He stepped down from the position in December 2017 and claimed to be starting a non-profit news site focusing on local New York news.

=== Daily News second editorship ===
In January 2018, Daily News owners Tronc announced that Rich would be replacing Arthur Browne as editor-in-chief, following his retirement a month earlier. Tronc had purchased the newspaper for $1 from Mortimer Zuckerman in September 2017.

On July 23, 2018, Tronc announced that it would be firing Rich and more than 40 other members of staff at the Daily News. Rich was succeeded as editor by Robert York, who had been editor at Tronc's The Morning Call. Rich appeared to criticise the decision before its announcement, writing on Twitter: "If you hate democracy and think local governments should operate unchecked and in the dark, then today is a good day for you". The move was also criticised by New York governor Andrew Cuomo, who urged the company to reconsider the layoffs.

=== SWNS Media Group ===
After leaving the Daily News again, Rich served as editor of the British news agency SWNS Media Group.

=== Deadspin ===
In January 2020, G/O Media announced that Rich would take over as editor of its sports news website Deadspin. Since firing its previous editor Barry Petchesky in October 2019 for publishing non-sports content, the website had lost more than a dozen staff and not published any content since November. Before hiring Rich, G/O Media had recently moved the website's editorial office from New York City to Chicago, with 97% of the company's editorial staff supporting a vote of no confidence in CEO Jim Spanfeller following the move. Rich offered his sympathy for those who had left the website, saying "It’s not a decision you make lightly when you’re weighing your livelihood against your journalistic principles".

In March 2020, Deadspin began publishing news articles again. Rich became editorial director of G/O Media in April 2020.

On July 9, 2021, Rich resigned from G/O Media due to clashes with upper management. The New York Post suggested that he had been frustrated by editorial interference from Spanfeller and others. The position of G/O Media editorial director was eventually filled in January 2023 by Merrill Brown.

Rich then spent time as a consultant. In February 2022, he was reported to be producing a documentary on Penthouse founder Bob Guccione with A&E Networks.

In July 2023, G/O Media announced that Rich would be working again as editor of Deadspin. In March 2024, G/O Media announced that the website had been sold to Lineup Publishing and its entire staff team were fired.

== Personal life ==
Rich has been married three times. He and his third wife, New York Post journalist Mary Huhn, adopted their son in 2012. Huhn is the granddaughter of Henrietta Buckler Seiberling and great-granddaughter of Frank Seiberling.
