= Sidney James =

Sid, Syd, Sydney or Sidney James may refer to:

== Sportsmen ==
- Sidney James (footballer) (1891–1917), English centre forward and left half for Huddersfield Town
- Syd James (1895–1966), Australian rules footballer and cricketer
- Syd James (footballer, born 1898) (1898–1969), Australian rules footballer with Geelong

== Others ==
- Sydney James (priest) (1855–1934), English Archdeacon of Dudley
- Sydney Price James (1870–1946), English physician, parasitologist and malariologist
- Sidney L. James (1906–2004), American founding editor of Sports Illustrated
- Sid James (1913–1976), British-based South African actor and comedian
