= Tim Burke =

Tim Burke may refer to:

- Tim Burke (baseball) (born 1959), Major League Baseball pitcher
- Tim Burke (biathlete) (born 1982), American biathlete
- Tim Burke (golfer) (born 1986), American golfer
- Tim Burke (gridiron football), American football coach
- Tim Burke (ice hockey) (born 1955), American ice hockey player/coach
- Tim Burke (journalist), American journalist
- Tim Burke (visual effects supervisor) (born 1965)
- Tim Burke (wrestler) (1960–2011), American professional wrestler
- Timothy Burke (businessman), contractor and railroad owner
- Timothy Burke (politician) (1866–1926), member of the Wisconsin Legislature
