= David Roland =

American film director

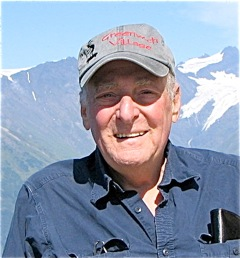
David Roland

David Roland is a film producer and director.

== Early life ==
Roland was born on February 8, 1930, in Beth Israel Hospital, the son of Samuel Roland, an actor with the Group Theater, and Anna Roland, a school librarian.

In 1937, the family moved to Greenwich Village and lived in a building that is now a historic landmark.

David Roland is a graduate of Little Red School House and its high school Elizabeth Irwin, where he wrote the school song and captained the basketball team, and attended New York University, where he directed the senior film project.

Roland was also deeply involved with Camp Woodland, as both a camper and a counselor. Camp Woodland (NY) existed from 1932-1963, a nurturer of progressive ideals and folk music conservation.

== Career ==
His earliest film experience was a summer job as guide and messenger at RKO, where His godfather Dore Schary was the head of the studio.

On leaving NYU, his first film job was with Shamus Culhane, an ex Disney animator, whose wife was Maxine Marx, the daughter of Chico Marx.

In a freelance documentary career spanning four decades, Roland worked for all the major networks and garnered two Emmy Awards, a Peabody Award and a citation from the National Academy of Science. One Emmy was won for Comedian Backstage, an insight into the work of Shelley Berman. The second Emmy was for In The News, an innovative news program designed for young people. Roland won the Peabody Award for Call It Macaroni, an experiential learning series that Roland conceived. The program involved filming young people in various situations which included, Dancing with Alvin Ailey, Spring Training with the Philadelphia Phillies, Living with the Circus, Swimming with Dolphins and Jazz in New Orleans. He did a film for NBC on changes which occurred in the Soviet Union as a result of Nikita Khrushchev coming to power. Another film that was constructed by Roland was on a play called The Dragon, which helps people to understand every aspect of what is like to be a part for the theater. Fire Rescue was another one of his projects and showed what it is like to be working in this section of the fire department. Roland is proud to use the technique of Cinema Verite in all of his films.

Roland was a member of the Peabody Awards Board of Jurors from 1995 to 2002 and served as chair from 2000 to 2002.

Roland produced and directed films for the American Mathematics Society on two outstanding mathematicians: Marsden Morse and Richard Courant. For Time/ Life he made Dam Builders, comparing the ecological impact of humans and beavers. For PBS, he constructed a film examining various aspects of psychiatric treatment. Roland also produced and directed a film on the Gate Theory of Pain.

Roland fulfilled a long time ambition when he was elected Business Agent of the Editor's Union, Local 771 Editor's Union, Local 771, IATSE. In 1968, David headed the Queens Ninth Congressional District campaign for Peace Candidate Eugene McCarthy and won 3 convention delegate seats out of six in a conservative district.

=== Political activities ===
Roland also worked as Legislative Assistant to New Jersey State Senator, Byron Baer, dealing with constituent problems. He also volunteered with the Bergen County Probation Department and Food Action. Roland continues to lead film seminars at colleges and high schools, libraries, and for community organizations to enhance appreciation of the various aspects of film as art.

=== Other projects ===
To raise funds for the Abraham Lincoln Brigade Archives (ALBA), Roland proposed a benefit program featuring Pete Seeger, Patti Smith and Guy Davis. He produced the entertainment section of the standing-room-only benefit at the Museum of the City of New York. Currently, he is working to establish an Archive of Songs of Social Significance at SUNY Purchase and is producing a concert to inaugurate the project.

Another film in progress is a documentary called 'Why Art?' Is it a Biological Necessity?, which has the support of Ian Tattersal of the American Museum of Natural History and Paleontologist Richard Leakey. The film will examine homo sapiens' apparent intrinsic need to create art.

Another project is a film about the Development and Meaning of Comedy and how it was used beginning with the Greeks, covering Shakespeare, and including modern times.

David was the Creative Consultant on a film about antisemitism in Poland and was awarded the accolade 'il miglor fabbro' (the better craftsman) by the film's producer.

He is married to writer Leah Margulies Roland. They have three children; Samuel J. Roland, Abigail Roland, and Jessica Roland. They have six grandchildren.
