= Ladies and Gentlemen, the Bronx Is Burning =

Book by Jonathan Mahler

Ladies and Gentlemen, the Bronx Is Burning: 1977, Baseball, Politics, and the Battle for the Soul of a City
- Author: Jonathan Mahler
- Language: English
- Genre: History
- Set in: New York City
- Published: 2005
- Publisher: Farrar, Straus and Giroux
- Publication place: United States
- Media type: Print
- Pages: 368
- ISBN: 9781429931038

Ladies and Gentlemen, the Bronx Is Burning: 1977, Baseball, Politics, and the Battle for the Soul of a City is a book by Jonathan Mahler that focuses on the year 1977 in New York City. First published in 2005, it's described as 'a layered account', 'kaleidoscopic', 'a braided narrative', which weaves political, cultural, and sporting threads into one narrative. It was also the basis for the ESPN mini-series The Bronx Is Burning.

== Origins of the phrase ==
Part of the phrase surfaced in television media in 1972 as the title of an episode from the Man Alive documentary series co-produced by BBC Television and Time-Life Films. Entitled The Bronx Is Burning, the hour-long episode shadowed Engine Company 82 and Ladder Company 31 as they operated throughout the Bronx, chronicling the impact of austerity upon fire safety services in the borough.

It was five years later in this same borough that Game 2 of the 1977 World Series was played on October 12 at Yankee Stadium. ABC cameras covering the game cut to a helicopter shot of the surrounding neighborhood where a large fire was shown raging out of control in Public School 3, a building occupying the block bordered by Melrose and Courtlandt Avenues and 157th and 158th Streets. The following exchange occurred between ABC announcers Keith Jackson and Howard Cosell:

Jackson: "That is a live picture, obviously a major fire in a large building in the south Bronx region of New York City. That's a live picture, and obviously the fire department in the Bronx have there, a problem. My goodness, that's a huge blaze." Cosell: "That's the very area where President Carter trod just a few days ago."

About nine minutes later, viewers were again being shown the scene of the fire from the helicopter's camera:

Cosell: "That's a live shot again, of that fire in the south Bronx that Keith called to your attention just a few moments ago. Wonder how many alarms are involved? But as Keith said, the fire department really has its work cut out for it."

Altogether the two men spoke about the fire on five occasions. Television viewers were repeatedly assured that no one had been hurt, but were told mistakenly that the site was a vacant apartment building. According to the New York Post, the words used by the two broadcasters during the game were later "spun by credulous journalists" into the now ubiquitous phrase "Ladies and gentlemen, the Bronx is burning" without either of the two announcers actually having phrased it that way.

== Fiscal and spiritual crisis ==
The book begins by telling of the fiscal and spiritual crisis, as Jonathan Mahler calls it, of the city in the mid-1970s. In political cartoons, New York had become a sinking ship, a zoo where the apes were employed as zookeepers, a naughty puppy swatted by a rolled-up newspaper. New York's finances were in need of attention. Less than halfway through Abraham Beame's term as mayor, the city was "careering toward bankruptcy." And perhaps there were signs that the 'cultural axis' had tilted. In 1972, The Tonight Show Starring Johnny Carson had moved from Midtown Manhattan to Burbank, California—the cultural equivalent of the Brooklyn Dodgers move to Los Angeles—and Carson would stick the boot in by sprinkling his monologues with reminders of the city's decline. "Some Martians landed in Central Park today ... and were mugged."

== Baseball thread ==
The baseball thread of Mahler's book focuses on the New York Yankees. In the 1976 World Series, the Yankees had been beaten by the Cincinnati Reds, but had won their first pennant since 1964, and the fans were cheering Billy Martin—back in New York after 18 years. At 47, "he had the look of a rather shopworn Mississippi riverboat gambler." Martin's cockiness, scrappiness, and hunger to win met with a positive response in the South Bronx. On November 29, 1976, Reggie Jackson joined the Yankees. Mahler compares Jackson not to Joe DiMaggio but to another Joe—Joe Namath: "Both were mini-skirt chasing bachelors, and had confidence to bring the city victory." All winter the papers filled with speculation about how Jackson and Thurman Munson, the Yankees catcher and captain, were going to get along. Those who knew him described Munson as moody; his friend Sparky Lyle didn't agree: "When you're moody, you're nice sometimes." Mahler looks at the new Yankee dynasty that was forming in '77: Mickey Rivers, Willie Randolph, Reggie ... and those close to Martin—Catfish Hunter, Lou Piniella, Graig Nettles. Fran Healy, the backup catcher, was Jackson's only friend on the team. Mahler looks at certain key games:

- May 23, 1977: Boston Red Sox vs Yankees: Jackson, after hitting a homer, ignored his teammates and manager, who had gathered at the dugout entrance for the requisite posthomer handshakes. "I had a bad hand," Jackson explained; "He's a fucking liar," responded Munson.
- June 18, 1977: Yankees vs Red Sox: Martin replaced Jackson in right field in the middle of the inning after he perceives Jackson "dogging it" chasing down a base hit, resulting in a double. Once in the dugout, Jackson confronted Martin, escalating in an ugly altercation clearly visible to everyone in the ballpark as well as a large TV audience, since the game was nationally televised. In the aftermath of this fiasco, rumors flew that Martin would be fired and replaced by Frank Robinson; instead, George Steinbrenner gave Martin an ultimatum: he could either stop moving Jackson up and down the batting order for no good reason and have him bat in the 4th or "cleanup" position, or he could refuse and immediately be fired. Martin reluctantly agreed to this, and Jackson's play improved noticeably for the rest of the season into the playoffs.
- August 21, 1977: Ron Guidry helped push the Yankees past the Baltimore Orioles and within half a game of the Red Sox.
- Game 6 of the 1977 World Series: The Yankees had achieved a 3–2 games advantage against the Los Angeles Dodgers in the best-of-seven championship series, "and the teams had become emblematic of the cities for the time being—the friendly easy-going Dodgers, the tired neurotic Yankees. [Woody Allen's film] Annie Hall made the same point." In Game 6, Jackson hit three home runs, in consecutive at bats, on just three pitches (Each pitch was thrown by a different pitcher.).

== Cultural thread ==
The cultural thread of Mahler's book focuses particularly on the impact of Rupert Murdoch. News of Murdoch's purchase of the New York Post broke on November 20, 1976. In 1973, he'd gathered up the San Antonio News and launched the National Star as a "supermarket tabloid"; now the ailing Post was in his grip, and his eyes also turned to Clay Felker's New York. Murdoch was an active presence in the newsroom according to Mahler's account, peering over reporters' shoulders and punching up the paper's headlines and copy. In March 1977 alone, The Post ran 21 items on Farrah Fawcett-Majors, a star of Charlie's Angels; stories became shorter, pictures bigger, headlines louder.

Within the cultural thread, Mahler writes of the music of the time. "Now is the summer of our discothèques" the journalist Anthony Haden-Guest had written in New York magazine. Studio 54, the discothèque that defined an era of nightlife, had opened in April 1977. Paramount Pictures had just begun shooting Saturday Night Fever; by the end of the summer, disco would be America's second largest grossing entertainment business after professional sports. If discos like Studio 54 provided an escape from the ugliness, its punk analog, a bar on The Bowery called CBGB, embraced it, featuring acts such as Television, Blondie, Patti Smith, and the Ramones. "Broken youth stumbling into the home of broken age," wrote Frank Rose in the Village Voice.

In the midst of the various threads, Mahler writes of the Son of Sam murders and of the New York City blackout of 1977, which took place on July 13–14, 1977. As a serial killer preyed on an alarmingly increasing number of victims while eluding a visibly shaken and financially strapped police force, a blanket of hot muggy weather descended on the city. Demand for electricity peaked in the middle of the afternoon when air conditioners were rumbling all over the city. That night, a major blackout— "a total urban eclipse"—struck, and all five boroughs of New York City and most of Westchester County were suddenly without power for several hours. The mass looting that ensued remains the only civil disturbance in the history of NYC to encompass all five boroughs simultaneously, and the 3776 arrests were the largest mass arrest in the city's history.

== Political thread ==
Mahler recounts the 1977 mayoral race, and the battle between three diverse candidates:

- Liberal Bella Abzug, born Bella Savitzky in 1920. She grew up in a South Bronx railroad flat.
- Ambitious Ed Koch, a Bronx native and the middle child of Jewish immigrants from Poland. He was "marked down as a Greenwich Village liberal when in fact he was more conservative than that"; he was endorsed by the Post.
- The "handsome" Mario Cuomo, "the candidate of the outer boroughs," known for his involvement in a 1972 public housing dispute in Forest Hills, and before that the Corona Fighting 69. An Italian kid from working-class Queens, "he aspired to liberal ideals, but by instinct and impulse he was not a liberal"; he was pushed into running by Governor Hugh Carey and championed by Jimmy Breslin.

Koch took office on the first day of 1978.

== Critical reception ==
Kirkus Reviews wrote: "With a nice touch for pop culture, Mahler paints an informed picture of a bright city in a dark hour."

== See also ==
- The Bronx Zoo
