= The George Foster Peabody Awards Board of Jurors =

This table outlines all of the people who have ever been a juror for The Peabody Awards.

== List ==
Juror	Years active	Occupation at the time of joining the board	Position
Edward Weeks	July 1940 – June 1977	Editor, Atlantic Monthly	Chairman, July 1940 – June 1954
Bruce Barton	July 1940 – June 1942	President, Batten, Barton, Dustin, and Osborne Advertising Agencies	Member
John H. Benson	July 1940 – June 1960	President, American Association of Advertising Agencies	Member
Virginius Dabney	July 1940 – June 1942	Editor, Times-Dispatch	Member
Jonathan Daniels	July 1940 – June 1950	Editor, News and Observer	Member
Norman H. Davis	July 1940 – June 1942	Chairman, American Red Cross and former Acting Secretary of State	Member
Mark F. Ethridge	July 1940 – June 1954	Vice president and general manager, Courier-Journal and Times	Member
Waldemar Kaempffert	July 1940 – June 1956	Science editor, New York Times	Member
Alfred A. Knopf	July 1940 – June 1946	Publisher	Member
Grace Moore	July 1940 – June 1942	Metropolitan Opera Company	Member
John Ward Studebaker	July 1940 – June 1942	United States Commissioner of Education and chairman, Federal Radio Education Committee	Member
Marjorie Peabody Waite	July 1940 – June 1944	Daughter of George Foster Peabody	Member
Dr. Ralph Casey	July 1942 – June 1946	Director, School of Journalism, University of Minnesota	Member
Earl Glade	July 1942 – June 1966	Chairman, NAB Code Compliance Committee	Member
Joseph Henry Jackson	July 1942 – June 1952	Literary editor, San Francisco Chronicle	Member
Beatrice Sawyer Rossell	July 1942 – June 1943	-	Member
Dr. I. Keith Tyler	July 1942 – June 1952 and July 1953 – June 1978	Director, evaluation of school broadcasts, Ohio State University	Member
Elizabeth Ames	July 1944 – June 1969	Director of Yaddo	Member
Dr. Dixon Wecter	July 1945 – June 1947	Professor of English, University of California and associate fellow, Huntington Museum	Member
Bennett A. Cerf	July 1946 – June 1967 and July 1970 – June 1971	President, Random House, Inc.	Chairman from July 1954 to June 1967
Ralph McGill	July 1946 – February 3, 1969	Editor, Atlanta Constitution	Member
John Crosby	July 1947 – June 1962	Radio columnist of the New York Herald Tribune	Member
Paul Porter	July 1947 – June 1963 and July 1964 – June 1975	Former chairman of the Federal Communications Commission	Member
Dorothy Lewis	July 1948 – June 1951 and July 1952 – June 1977	Coordinator, Women's Broadcasts	Member
Philip Hamburger	July 1950 – June 1952 and July 1953 – June 1959 and July 1960 – June 1961	Television writer of The New Yorker	Member
Terrence O’Flaherty	July 1952 – June 1963 and July 1964 – June 1965 and July 1966 – 1984	Radio-TV editor, San Francisco Chronicle	Member
Henry F. Pringle	July 1954 – June 1956	Pulitzer Prize-winning author	Member
Mrs. Harold V. Milligan	July 1955 – June 1967	Representing Peabody Listening Posts	Member
Harriet Van Horne	July 1958 – June 1967	Radio-TV editor, New York World Telegram and Sun	Member
Larry Wolters	July 1958 – February 28, 1969	TV editor, Chicago Tribune	Member
Edgar Kobak	July 1959 – June 1, 1961	Communications and business consultant	Member
John Lardner	July 1959 – March 24, 1960	Writer, The New Yorker and Newsweek	Member
Sterling Fisher	July 1962 – June 1963	Director of public relations, Reader’s Digest	Member
Newton N. Minow	July 1963 – June 1976	Executive vice president and general counsel, Encyclopædia Britannica and former chairman, Federal Communications Commission	Member
John Charles Daly	July 1966 – June 1982	Communications consultant	Member
Don Freeman	July 1966 – June 1984	TV editor, San Diego Union	Member
Eugene R. Black	July 1967 – 1977	Special Advisor to the President for Economic and Social Development in Southeast Asia	Chair, 1967 – 1977
Dr. Harold Niven	July 1967 – June 1984	Vice president, National Association of Broadcasters and Executive Secretary, Association for Professional Broadcasting Education	Member
Dr. Gertrude B. Broderick	July 1968 – June 1978	Media research associate, Instructional Materials and Practice Branch, U.S. Department of Health, Education, and Welfare	Member
Sidney L. James	July 1975 – 1979	Retired vice president, Time, Inc., founding editor, Sports Illustrated, former Assistant Managing Editor, LIFE, and chairman, Greater Washington Educational Television Association	Chair July 1977 – 1979
Dr. William G. Harley	July 1976 – June 1985	President emeritus, National Association of Educational Broadcasters and Media Consultant, UNESCO	Chairman, July 1979 – June 1985
W. Thomas Johnson	July 1976 – June 1980	Publisher, Dallas Times-Herald, President and Chief Operating Officer, Los Angeles Times	Member
Dr. Lionel C. Barrow, Jr.	July 1977 – June 1980	Dean, School of Communications, Howard University	Member
Elizabeth S. Carpenter	July 1977 – 1983	Public affairs director, Lyndon B. Johnson Library and former Assistant Secretary of Education	Member
Kitty Carlisle Hart	July 1977 – June 1983	Chairman, New York State Council of the Arts	Member
Robert Hudson	July 1977 – 1979	Former vice president, National Educational Television, former faculty member, University of Illinois, and member, Fund for Advancement of Education	Member
Dr. Karl E. Meyer	July 1977 – June 1983	TV editor, Saturday Review	Member
Wade H. Mosby	July 1977 – June 1983	Editor, TV Screen, Milwaukee Journal	Member
Peggy Mobley Childs	July 1978 – June 1984	State representative, Georgia Legislature	Member
Dr. Barbara Jordan	July 1978 – June 1980	Professor, Lyndon B. Johnson School of Public Affairs, University of Texas at Austin	Member
J. Leonard Reinsch	July 1979 – June 1985	Retired chairman of the board, Cox Broadcasting Corporation and co-chairman, Warner/AMEX Cable Corporation	Member
Margita E. White	July 1979 – June 1985	Former commissioner, Federal Communications Commission	Member
Joyce J. Bartell	July 1980 – June 1988	Former director, Wisconsin School of the Air	Member
Arlene Francis Gabel	July 1980 – June 1982	Noted stage and radio personality	Member
John E. Reinhardt	July 1980 – June 1987	Former ambassador and director, National Museum of African Art	Member
Les Brown	July 1982 – June 1988	Author and editor-in-chief, Channels of Communication	Member
Dr. Frank Manchel	July 1982 – June 1989	Assistant dean, University of Vermont College of Arts and Sciences, and Coordinator, Communications Program, UVM	Chair, July 1985 – June 1987
Edward W. Hummers, Jr.	July 1983 – June 1989	Communications attorney	Chair, July 1987 – June 1989
Barbara Matusow	July 1983 – June 1988	Author, journalist	Member
F. Glenn Verrill	July 1983 – June 1989	President, BDA/BBDO	Member
Abbott Washburn	July 1983 – June 1989	Former ambassador and former commissioner, Federal Communications Commission	Member
John Carman	July 1984 – June 1991	TV editor, The Atlanta Journal and Constitution	Member
Edward M. Cramer	July 1984 – June 1991	President, Broadcast Music, Inc.	Member
Ambassador Sonia Landau	July 1984 – June 1991	Chairman of the board, Corporation for Public Broadcasting	Member
Lawrence B. Taishoff	July 1984 – 1991	Publisher, Broadcasting Magazine	Member
Jean Firstenberg	July 1985 – June 1991	President, American Film Institute	Chair, 1989 – 1991
Jill S. Ruckelshaus	July 1985 – June 1991	Former Assistant to the President for Women's Affairs and former commissioner, U.S. Commission on Civil Rights	Member
Julian Goodman	July 1986 – June 1992	Former chairman of the board, NBC and member of Gannett Board	Member
Lamond Godwin	July 1987 – June 1989	First vice president, American Express Bank, Ltd.	Member
Merrill Brown	July 1988 – June 1991	Editor, Channels Magazine	Member
Thomas C. Dowden	July 1988 – June 1994	President, Dowden Communication Investors	Chair, July 1991 – June 1993
Susan Stewart	July 1988 – June 1994 and July 2004 – June 2005	TV critic, The Detroit Free Press	Member
Ambassador Sheldon Krys	July 1989 – June 1995 and July 1996 – June 1997	Assistant Secretary of State for Diplomatic Security	Chair, July 1993 – June 1995
Clark Pollock	July 1989 – June 1994	Former president, Nationwide Communication, Inc.	Member
Frances Preston	July 1989 – June 1995	President and CEO, Broadcast Music, Inc.	Member
Dr. Horace Newcomb	July 1990 – June 1995	Professor, radio-TV-film, University of Texas	Member, Director from 2001 – June 2013
Louisa A. Nielsen	July 1990 – June 1995	Executive director, Broadcast Education Association	Member
Elizabeth Crow	July 1991 – June 1996	President, Gruner & Jahr USA Publishing	Member
Holly Echols	July 1991 – June 1997	Manager-media relations, AT&T	Member
Doris Indyke	July 1991 – June 1996 and July 2002 – June 2003	Executive director, Through the Flower and Media Consultant	Member
Regina Resnik	July 1991 – June 1996	Former member, The Metropolitan Opera; writer, producer, director; Member of the Board, Metropolitan Opera Guild	Member
Ernest Sanchez	July 1991 – June 1996	Communications attorney; former attorney, Corporation for Public Broadcasting and general counsel for National Public Radio	Member
Tom Shales	July 1991 – June 1996	TV critic, The Washington Post and Pulitzer prize-winning author	Member
Nancy Woodhull	July 1991 – April 1, 1997	President, Nancy Woodhull & Associates, Inc.	Chair, July 1995 – April 1, 1997
Bruce DuMont	July 1992 – June 1998	President, Museum of Broadcast Communications, Chicago Cultural Center	Chair, July 1997 – June 1998
Neil L. Aronstam	July 1993 – June 2000 and July 2005 – June 2006	President, Independent Media Services, Inc.	Chair, July 1998 – June 2000
Sir Michael Checkland	July 1994 – June 2000	Retired director general, BBC	Member
Ed Bark	July 1995 – June 2000	TV critic, The Dallas Morning News	Member
Dr. James Carey	July 1995 – June 2002	Professor, Columbia University School of Journalism	Member
Dr. Jannette Dates	July 1995 – June 2002	Acting dean, Howard University School of Communications	Member
Dr. James Hindman	July 1995 – June 2001	Deputy director, The American Film Institute	Member
David Roland	July 1995 – June 2002	President, The Roland Company	Chair, July 2000 – June 2002
Marcie Ersoff	July 1996 – June 2003	Retired news executive and media consultant	Member
Betty J. Hudson	July 1996 – June 2003	Senior vice president corporate communications, The Reader's Digest Association, Inc.	Chair, July 2002 – June 2003
Ron Nessen	July 1996 – June 2003	Program host, nostalgia television	Chair, July 2003 – June 2004
Stuart Revill	July 1996 – June 2003	Former assistant managing director, Australian Broadcasting Commission	Member
Howard Rosenberg	July 1996 – June 2003	TV critic, Los Angeles Times	Member
Sonia Manzano	July 1997 – June 2001	Actress/writer, Children's Television Workshop	Member
William F. Woo	July 1997 – June 2003	Professor of journalism, Department of Communication, Stanford University	Member
Marlene Sanders	July 1998 – June 2004	Professional-in-resident, Media Studies Center	Member
Danforth P. Fales	July 2000 – June 2005	Media consultant	Member
Peter Fiddick	July 2000 – June 2006	Meat critic and editor	Chair, July 2005 – June 2006
Helen DeMichiel	July 2001 – June 2007	National director, National Alliance for Media Arts and Culture	Member
Meryl Marshall-Daniels	July 2001 – June 2007	President, Two Oceans Entertainment Group	Chair, July 2006 – June 2007
Bel Hernandez	July 2002 – June 2008	Co-founder, LATINHEAT Magazine	Member
Robert H. Levi	July 2002 – June 2003	Entertainment industry programming & distribution consultant	Member
Joanne Ostrow	July 2002 – June 2005	TV/radio critic, The Denver Post	Member
Johnathan Rodgers	July 2002 – June 2003	Former president, Discovery Networks and President/CEO, Radio One-Comcast Television projects	Member
Yuen-Ying Chan	July 2003 – June 2009	Professor, Journalism & Media Studies Centre, Hong Kong University	Member
Barbara Cochran	July 2003 – present	President, RTNDA	Member
Rebecca Leet	July 2003 – June 2007	President, Rebecca Leet Associates	Member
Ron Simon	July 2003 – June 2009	Curator, television, The Museum of Television & Radio	Chair, July 2008 – June 2009
Susan Douglas	July 2004 – July 2010	Department chair, communication studies, University of Michigan	Chair, July 2009 – June 2010
Jonathan Estrin	July 2004 – June 2009	Executive vice president, American Film Institute	Member
Raúl Garza	July 2004 – June 2011	Sr. VP and director, U.S. Diversity Communications Group, Hill & Knowlton, Inc.	Chair, July 2010 – June 2011
Frazier Moore	July 2004 – June 2010	TV writer, Associated Press	Member
Melanie McFarland	July 2005 – June 2011	TV critic, Seattle Post-Intelligencer	Member
Dwight Ellis	July 2006 – June 2008	President & CEO, Dwight Ellis & Associates Ltd.	Member
Frank-Dieter Freiling	July 2006 – June 2008	Senior vice president, international affairs, ZDF — German Television	Member
Harry Jessell	July 2006 – June 2011	Editor/publisher, TVNewsday	Member
Tim Brooks	July 2007 – June 2013	Executive vice president, research, Lifetime Entertainment Services	Member
Dr. Janet Murray	July 2007 – June 2013	Director, graduate studies, School of Literature, Communication & Culture, Georgia Institute of Technology	Member
Joe Urschel	July 2007 – June 2013	Executive director/senior VP, The Newseum	Chair, July 2011 – June 2013
Dr. Elizabeth Guider	July 2008 – June 2014	Editor The Hollywood Reporter	Member
Thomas Mattia	July 2008 – June 2015	CCO, Yale University	Chair, July 2013 – June 2015
Pamela Wallin	July 2008 – June 2009	Senior Advisor on Canada-U.S. Relations to the President, Council of the Americas	Member
Charlayne Hunter-Gault	July 2009 – June 2015	Journalist	Member
Allen Sabinson	July 2009 – June 2015	Dean, Westphal College of Media Arts & Design, Drexel University	Member
Fred Young	July 2009 – June 2016	Retired senior vice president, news, for Hearst-Argyle Television	Chair, July 2015 – June 2016
Steve Bryant	July 2010 – June 2016	Senior curator (television), BFI National Archive	Member
Doreen Ringer-Ross	July 2010 – June 2016	Vice president, film-TV relations, BMI	Member
Maureen Ryan	July 2010 – June 2016	Chief television critic, Variety	Member
Dr. Barbie Zelizer	July 2010 – June 2016	Raymond Williams Professor of Communication, Annenberg School for Communication, University of Pennsylvania	Member
Eddie Garrett	July 2011 – June 2018	Executive vice president, head of strategy, Weber Shandwick	Chair, July 2016 – June 2018
Marquita Pool-Eckert	July 2011 – June 2017	Adjunct faculty, Columbia Journalism School, Columbia University	Member
N. Bird Runningwater	July 2011 – June 2017	Director, Native American Program, Sundance Institute	Member
Eric Deggans	July 2013 – June 2019	TV critic, NPR	Chair, July 2018 – June 2019
John Huey	July 2013 – June 2018	Former editor-in-chief, Time, Inc.	Member
Dr. Henry Jenkins	July 2013 – present	Provost's Professor of Communications, Journalism, Cinematic Arts & Education, University of Southern California	Member
Dr. Jonathan Gray	July 2014 – present	Professor, media & cultural studies, Department of Communication Arts, University of Wisconsin-Madison	Member
Martha Nelson	July 2014 – present	Former editor-in-chief of Time Inc.	Chair, July 2019 – Present
Naibe Reynoso	July 2014 – present	Host and producer, Ora TV	Member
Simon Kilmurry	July 2015 – present	Executive director, International Documentary Association	Member
Monica Pearson	July 2015 – present	Former news anchor, WSB-TV, Atlanta	Member
Marcy Carsey	July 2016 – present	TV producer, co-founder, Carsey-Werner Company	Member
Herman Gray	July 2016 – present	Emeritus professor, sociology, UC Santa Cruz	Member
Kathy Im	July 2016 – present	Director of journalism and media; John D. and Catherine T. MacArthur Foundation	Member
Kim Masters	July 2016 – present	Editor-at-large, The Hollywood Reporter; Host, KCRW's "The Business"	Member
Mark McKinnon	July 2016 – present	Television producer and political analyst	Member
John Seigenthaler	July 2016 – present	Partner, DVL Seigenthaler and former anchor, NBC News	Member
Mike Monello	July 2017 – present	Founder/creative director, Campfire	Member
Lorraine Ali	July 2018 – present	TV critic, the Los Angeles Times	Member
Karen Hall	July 2018 – present	Veteran TV writer, producer, creative consultant	Member
Wonya Lucas	July 2018 – present	President and CEO, Public Broadcasting Atlanta	Member
Anne Sweeney	July 2018 – present	Former co-chair, Disney Media Networks, and president, Disney/ABC Television Group	Member
Dana A. Heller	November 2019 – present	Dean, College of Arts and Sciences, Eastern Michigan University	Member
Matt Zoller Seitz	November 2019 – present	TV critic, New York Magazine	Member
