= Johnathan A. Rodgers =

American television executive

Johnathan Rodgers was president and CEO of TV One, a real-life and entertainment cable television network targeting adult African American viewers. Launched in January 2004 with major backing from Radio One and Comcast, TV One features a broad range of real-life and entertainment programming designed to enlighten, entertain, inform and inspire a diverse audience of adult African American viewers. The network is currently available in nearly 48 million U.S. households, and is available in both standard and high-definition formats.

Rodgers retired on July 31, 2011.

== Career ==
Rodgers joined TV One in 2003, after a six-year stint as president of Discovery Networks, the domestic television division of Discovery Communications. During his tenure, the company's U.S. cable networks increased from two - Discovery Channel and The Learning Channel - to 11. Under Rodgers, the Discovery Channel achieved its highest ratings ever. In addition, Rodgers oversaw the conversion of The Learning Channel into TLC and the successful launches of Animal Planet, Discovery Kids and Discovery Health.

Prior to joining Discovery, Rodgers had a successful 20-year career at CBS, where he held a variety of executive positions including President of CBS' television stations group. During his career at CBS Television, Rodgers also served as an award-winning producer, news director and general manager; he was also an executive producer for CBS News.

Rodgers began his professional career as a print journalist working as a writer-reporter for Sports Illustrated; he later worked for Newsweek Magazine as an associate editor. Following that stint, Rodgers worked as a writer for WNBC-TV Channel Four News in New York City. Among the award-winning film editors that he worked with on the Sixth and 11th Hour News was Donald Swerdlow (now Don Canaan).

Rodgers received his undergraduate degree in journalistic studies from the University of California at Berkeley, and his master's in communications from Stanford University. He also served in the U.S. Army for two years.

Rodgers formerly served on the board of directors of the Procter & Gamble Company and currently serves on the Board of Directors of Nike and the National Cable & Telecommunications Association (NCTA), and is a trustee of the University of California (Berkeley) Foundation. He has been named to Ebony Magazine’s Power 150, and recognized as “The Visionary” in Essence magazine’s 2008 Black Hollywood Celebration of Excellence. He has also been named by Black Enterprise magazine to its list of the Top 50 Power Brokers in Hollywood and is the recipient of the NCTA’s Vanguard Award for Programmers, the cable industry’s highest honor presented to a programming executive.

In 2009, he has been named to the Broadcasting & Cable Hall of Fame and honored with a Trumpet Award, created to celebrate and honor African-American achievers in diverse fields including law, medicine, business, politics and entertainment. Rodgers was a member of the Peabody Awards Board of Jurors from 2002 to 2003.

== Personal life ==
Rodgers and his wife, Royal Kennedy, have two children and reside in Washington, DC.
