= Elizabeth Crow =

American editor, journalist, and businesswoman

Elizabeth Crow (born Elizabeth Venture Smith; July 29, 1946 – April 4, 2005) was an American editor, journalist, and businesswoman.

Born in Manhattan, Crow was the oldest child in a family of six children. Her father, Harrison Venture Smith, was a senior executive at the Morgan Guaranty Trust Company, and her mother, Marlis deGreve Smith, was a housewife. Crow attended Mills College, earning a bachelor's degree in 1968. In the fall of that year she entered Brown University to pursue a master's degree, but left just a few weeks into the semester to join the editorial staff at New York magazine where she worked for the next decade.

In 1974 Crow married Patrick Crow with whom she had three children: Samuel, Rachel, and Sarah. Their marriage ended in divorce. In 1978 Crow left New York to become the editor in chief of Parents magazine and spent the next several years overhauling both the content and the appearance of that magazine. In 1988 she became the CEO of the American branch of Gruner + Jahr which at that time was publishing seven different magazines, including Parents. Crow overhauled the content and appearance of all of these magazines, and successfully raised the revenue of all seven by more than 50 percent over the next five years. In 1993 Crow left Gruner + Jahr to become the editor-in-chief of Mademoiselle. She was a member of the Peabody Award Board of Jurors from 1991 to 1996. In the last decade of her life, she worked in a variety of jobs, including vice president and editorial director of Rodale, Inc., editorial director of Primedia (now RentGroup), and editorial director of Consumers Union. Crow was also notably a long time board member of the Metropolitan Opera and served on the advisory panel of Opera News magazine.

Crow died on April 4, 2005, of esophageal cancer, according to her son, Samuel.
