= Manti Teʻo =

American football player (born 1991)

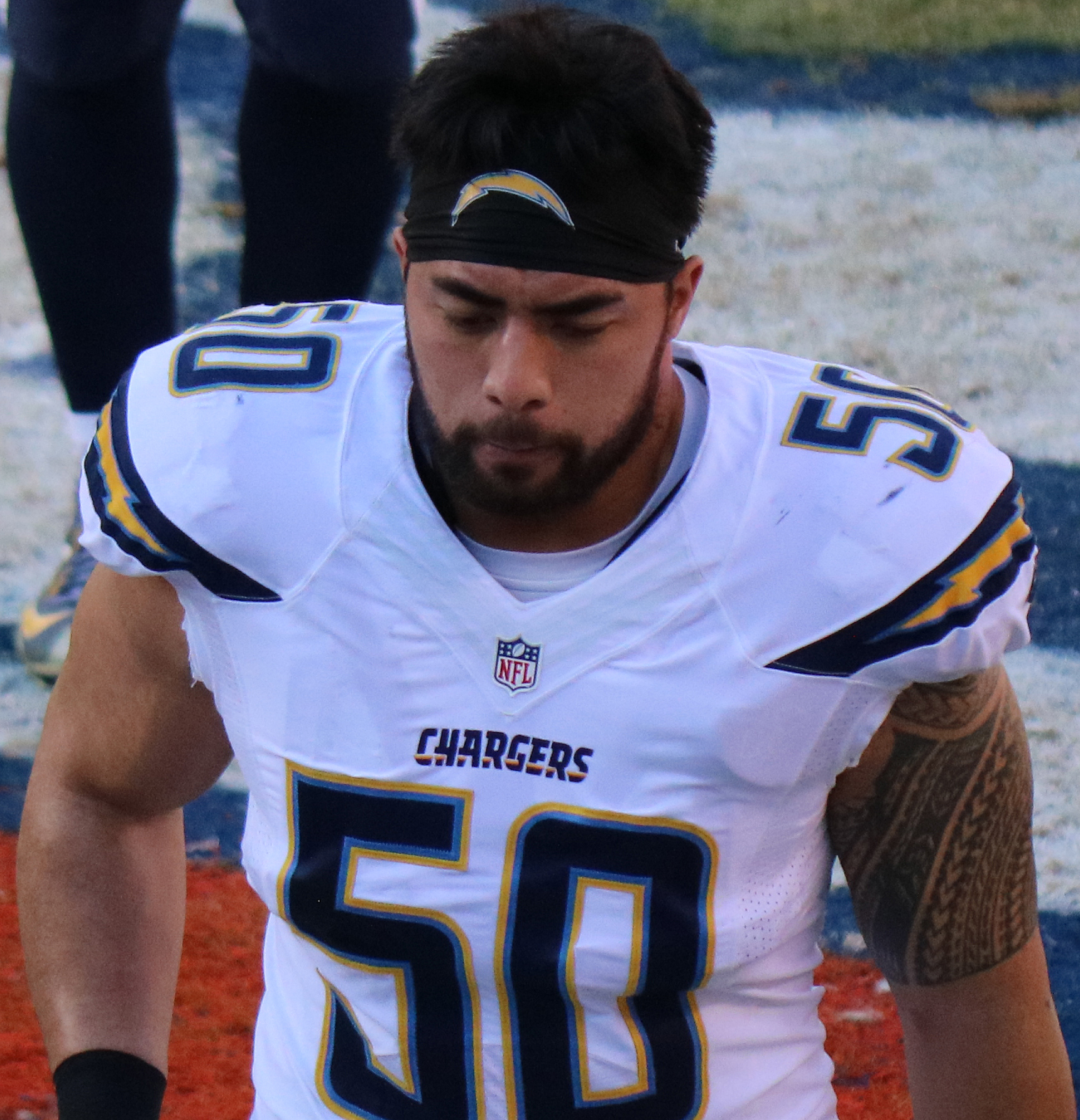
- Teʻo with the San Diego Chargers in 2016

No. 50, 51, 57
- Position: Linebacker

Personal information
- Born: January 26, 1991 (age 35); Laie, Hawaii, U.S.
- Listed height: 6 ft 1 in (1.85 m)
- Listed weight: 241 lb (109 kg)

Career information
- High school: Punahou (Honolulu, Hawaii)
- College: Notre Dame (2009–2012)
- NFL draft: 2013: 2nd round, 38th overall pick

Career history
- San Diego Chargers (2013–2016); New Orleans Saints (2017–2019); Chicago Bears (2020)

Awards and highlights
- Maxwell Award (2012); Walter Camp Award (2012); Lott Trophy (2012); Chuck Bednarik Award (2012); Bronko Nagurski Trophy (2012); Butkus Award (college) (2012); Lombardi Award (2012); Unanimous All-American (2012); Second-team All-American (2011)

Career NFL statistics
- Total tackles: 307
- Sacks: 1.5
- Forced fumbles: 1
- Fumble recoveries: 1
- Interceptions: 2
- Stats at Pro Football Reference

Manti Malietau Louis Teʻo (/ˈmæntaɪ ˈtɛʔoʊ/ MAN-ty TE'-oh; born January 26, 1991) is an American former professional football player who was a linebacker in the National Football League (NFL). He played college football for the Notre Dame Fighting Irish, earning unanimous All-American honors and receiving multiple national awards. He was selected by the San Diego Chargers in the second round of the 2013 NFL draft and played in the NFL until 2021. Since 2024, Teʻo has worked as an on-air commentator and analyst for NFL Network.

== Early life ==
Teʻo played for Punahou School, a private co-ed institution in Honolulu, where he had also attended middle school. Teʻo began his varsity career in 2006 with stellar play that won him selection to the second-team all-state roster as a sophomore. As a junior in 2007, Teʻo was named the state defensive player of the year by the Honolulu Advertiser and the Gatorade state player of the year. He received first-team all-state honors while totaling 90 tackles and five sacks on defense and 400 rushing yards and ten touchdowns as a running back. Teʻo drew considerable attention from colleges and recruiters in the process.

Teʻo came into his senior year as one of the most celebrated players and recruits both on the state and national levels, landing on a number of national top ten recruiting lists before the start of the season. He received offers from over 30 college programs. During his senior year, Teʻo helped lead Punahou to its first-ever state championship in football during the 2008 season. He amassed 129 tackles, including 11 sacks, forced three fumbles, tipped four passes and totaled 19 quarterback hurries. On offense at running back, Teʻo rushed for 176 yards (5.3 yards per carry) and four touchdowns and had three receptions, two for touchdowns. He also had three touchdowns, returning one 49 yards for a touchdown. He also returned a blocked punt for a touchdown.

Teʻo received his second straight Gatorade state player of the year award for his play during the season and was named first-team all-state and the state defensive player of the year for the second straight season. Teʻo was such a force that The Honolulu Advertiser considered just naming him the overall state player of the year. He is regarded as one of the most highly recruited athletes, both in football and for any sport, in the history of the state of Hawaii.

In 2008, Teʻo won the inaugural Butkus Award at the high school level, awarded to the best prep linebacker in the United States. He was also named the 2008 Sporting News High School Athlete of the Year, becoming the first person from the state of Hawaii and the first athlete of Polynesian descent to receive the award. USA Today named Teʻo the national Defensive Player of the Year and a first-team All-American. He is only the third high school player from Hawaii to be named to the USA Today All-American team, after Pat Kesi in 1990 and Jason Ching in 1995 (Ching, too, is a Punahou and Notre Dame alumnus). Teʻo was also named to the 2009 Parade All-American team as well. On January 10, 2010, Teʻo was named the Hawaii State Defensive Player of the Decade (2000–2009) by the Honolulu Advertiser.

=== College recruitment and rankings ===
Teʻo was nationally regarded as one of the elite prospects of the class of 2009. Major recruiting service Rivals.com listed him as a five-star recruit—the first from Hawaii since Jonathan Mapu in 2002—and ranked him second among inside linebackers only behind Vontaze Burfict. Also listed as five-star recruit, Teʻo was ranked as the No. 1 strongside linebacker in his class by Scout.com.

College recruiting
Name	Hometown	School	Height	Weight	40^{‡}	Commit date
Manti Teʻo; LB	Laie, HI	Punahou	6 ft 2 in (1.88 m)	225 lb (102 kg)	4.6	Feb 4, 2009
Manti Teʻo; LB	Recruit ratings: Scout: Rivals: (93)					

On National Signing Day of 2009, Teʻo committed to the University of Notre Dame. He chose the Fighting Irish, then coached by Charlie Weis, over Brigham Young and Southern California. Teʻo was the first USA Today Defensive Player of the Year to commit to the Irish since Kory Minor in 1995.

== College career ==
Teʻo enrolled in the University of Notre Dame, where he played for the Notre Dame Fighting Irish football team from 2009 to 2012.

=== Freshman season ===
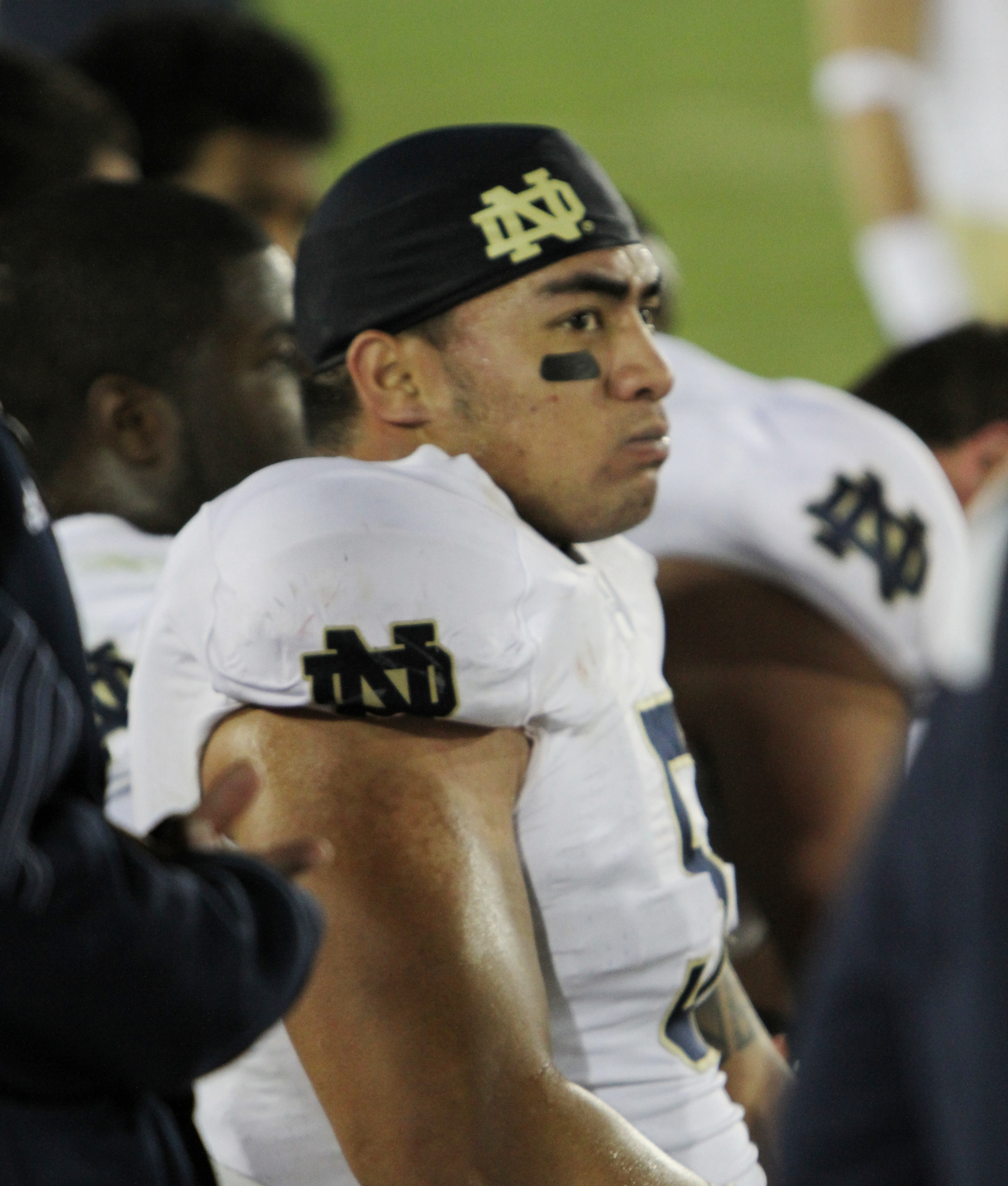
Teʻo during 2010 game against USC

Teʻo entered his first college game at the start of the second defensive series early in the second quarter versus Nevada on September 5, 2009. On his third snap Teʻo tackled Wolf Pack quarterback Colin Kaepernick after an 11-yard gain on third and 15 for his first collegiate tackle. After playing, but not starting, his first three games, Teʻo made his first collegiate start in the Irish's game versus Purdue. He played in all 12 games of his freshman season and finished the season with 63 tackles, the third-most tackles ever by a Notre Dame freshman behind Bob Golic (82 in 1975) and Ross Browner (68 in 1973). Teʻo also recorded 5.5 tackles for loss and 1 sack. On December 8, 2009, Teʻo was named a Freshman All-American by College Football News. He was also named a second-team Freshman All-American by Rivals.com.

=== Sophomore season ===
Teʻo moved from outside to inside linebacker in 2010 as Notre Dame switched to a 3–4 defensive scheme under defensive coordinator Bob Diaco. On April 30, 2010, Teʻo was named to the 2010 Lombardi Award & Nagurski Award watch lists. Teʻo led the Fighting Irish in tackles with 133, and was second in tackles for loss with 9.5. Against Stanford on September 25, Teʻo finished with 21 total tackles. This total represents a career-high for Teʻo and is also the most tackles in a game by an individual for Notre Dame since 2006. Teʻo was named one of 16 semifinalists for both the Butkus Award (Best Collegiate Linebacker) and the Bednarik Award for top College defensive player. He was also named a Second-team All-American by CNNSI.

=== Junior season ===
Teʻo led the Fighting Irish in tackles for the second straight season in 2011 with 128. He also led the team in tackles for loss with 13.5 and finished second in sacks with 5.0. Teʻo was a finalist for the Butkus Award and the Lott Trophy and was selected as the 2011 FBS Independent Defensive Player of the Year. Teʻo was named a second-team All-American by the Associated Press, Walter Camp Football Foundation, Rivals.com, Phil Steele and CNNSI. He was also named to the Capital One Academic All-American second-team.

=== Senior season ===
Teʻo announced on December 11, 2011, that he would return to Notre Dame for his senior season. Teʻo entered his final season as one of 10 players in Notre Dame history to record over 300 career tackles and started the season eighth on the career tackles list for the Fighting Irish. During the season, Teʻo was the leading tackler and leader in interceptions for a 12–0 Notre Dame team which had the second-ranked scoring defense (10.33 points per game) in the country. He had 103 tackles in the regular season (52 solo, 51 assisted, 8.58 per game), including 5.5 tackles for loss and 1.5 sacks (one for 13 yards of Oklahoma quarterback Landry Jones.) Teʻo also led the team, as well as all FBS linebackers, in interceptions. Teʻo's 7 interceptions during the 2012 season are the most by any FBS linebacker since 2001. He ranked third in the nation at 0.58 interceptions per game, and overall only Fresno State safety Phillip Thomas had more, with 8 interceptions that season. Teʻo's season-high per game was 2 interceptions for 28 yards against Michigan.

In the 2012 season, Notre Dame ranked second in the nation in scoring defense (10.33 points per game) and ranked in the top 19 nationally in four other defensive categories: fifth in rushing defense (92.42 yards per game), sixth in total defense (287.25 yards per game), 12th in pass efficiency defense (105.58) and 19th in sacks (2.75 per game). Teʻo's 8.58 tackles per game is three and a half more per game than the squad's next-most prolific tackler, Zeke Motta (5.09 per game). Teʻo is one of the most decorated defensive players in college football history. He won the 2012 Defensive IMPACT Player of the Year Lott Trophy, as well as the Maxwell Award, the Chuck Bednarik Award, the Bronko Nagurski Trophy, the Butkus Award, the Lombardi Award, and the Walter Camp Award. In addition, he was named a national scholar-athlete by the National Football Foundation. One of three finalists for the Heisman Trophy, Teʻo eventually finished second in the voting to Texas A&M quarterback Johnny Manziel. In the BCS National Championship Game, Teʻo recorded 10 tackles in a 42–14 loss to a 12–1 Alabama team which won its third national championship in four years. Alabama took control from the start and led 14–0 after the first quarter and extended its lead to a 28–0 score by halftime. Teʻo finished with 7 assists and 3 solo tackles.

Teʻo had 437 total tackles in his four-year career at Notre Dame. He ranks third all-time in school history behind Bob Crable (521, 1978–81) and Bob Golic (479, 1975–78). He started in 47 consecutive games, beginning with the fourth game of his freshman season, at that point the longest streak of any linebacker in the country. He joined Crable as the second player in Notre Dame history to record 100+ tackles in three consecutive seasons.

== Professional career ==
=== Pre-draft ===
Teʻo decided to return to Notre Dame after the 2011 season despite being projected a late first-round pick for the 2012 NFL draft as early as mid-season of 2011. In preseason mock drafts from May 2012, Teʻo was listed as a late first-rounder for the 2013 NFL draft as well. By mid-season, he had moved up to the mid-first round. Notre Dame has not seen one of their linebackers selected in the first round since Bob Crable in 1982. At the conclusion of the 2012 college football season, Teʻo signed with agent Tom Condon. He was training at the IMG Academy in Bradenton, Florida, in preparation for the NFL Draft.

Pre-draft measurables
Height	Weight	Arm length	Hand span	Wingspan	40-yard dash	10-yard split	20-yard split	20-yard shuttle	Three-cone drill	Vertical jump	Broad jump	Bench press
6 ft 1 1/4 in (1.86 m)	241 lb (109 kg)	32 1/2 in (0.83 m)	9 1/2 in (0.24 m)	6 ft 4 in (1.93 m)	4.75 s	1.63 s	2.69 s	4.27 s	7.13 s	33 in (0.84 m)	9 ft 5 in (2.87 m)	21 reps
All values from NFL Combine/Notre Dame's Pro Day

Teʻo attended the NFL Combine under a lot of scrutiny by NFL teams. His comparably slow time of 4.82 in the 40-yard dash was disappointing, but he promised to "do a lot better" at his Notre Dame pro day. After the combine, Sports Illustrated projected Teʻo to fall out of the first round. At Notre Dame Pro Day on March 26, Teʻo ran faster according to ESPN's Todd McShay (hand-timed 4.75 and 4.71).

=== San Diego Chargers ===
==== 2013 season ====
He was selected in the second round, 38th overall by the San Diego Chargers, as the second inside linebacker in the draft behind Alec Ogletree. "It's a perfect scenario. My parents can come and watch, I can go home, it's San Diego," said Teʻo on draft day. He was the highest selected Notre Dame linebacker since Demetrius DuBose was selected 34th overall in 1993, until Jaylon Smith was also selected 34th in the 2016 NFL Draft. On May 9, 2013, Teʻo signed a four-year contract with the Chargers. The deal included a $2,141,768 signing bonus and was worth just over $5 million with over $3.1 million in guaranteed money. He was the second linebacker of Polynesian descent to play for the Chargers (after Junior Seau).

Teʻo injured his right foot in the Chargers' preseason opener against the Seattle Seahawks on August 8, which caused him to miss the remainder of preseason as well as the regular season opener against the Houston Texans. Teʻo made his NFL debut in a week 4 matchup against the Dallas Cowboys. Teʻo finished the game with three tackles as the Chargers won. Teʻo ended the season with 61 tackles and 4 passes defended in 13 games started.

==== 2014 season ====
Teʻo looked to improve from 2013; however, on September 23, 2014, Teʻo suffered a fractured foot. He returned in the middle of the season against the Oakland Raiders. Against the New England Patriots, Teʻo intercepted Tom Brady in the red zone, while covering Rob Gronkowski, for his first NFL interception. A few weeks later, in the Chargers comeback victory against the San Francisco 49ers, Teʻo earned his first NFL sack by sacking Colin Kaepernick—coincidentally, the first player Teʻo tackled in his collegiate career—on a 4th down play. Manti finished the season with 61 tackles, 1 sack, 1 interception, and 3 pass deflections.

==== 2015 season ====
In 2015, Teʻo had 63 tackles, one interception, and one forced fumble. He missed four games in mid-season due to an ankle injury.

==== 2016 season ====
On September 5, 2016, Teʻo was named one of the Chargers' team captains for the 2016 season. On September 28, 2016, he was placed on injured reserve with a torn Achilles.

=== New Orleans Saints ===
On March 21, 2017, Teʻo signed a two-year contract with the New Orleans Saints. He led the Saints in tackles for loss during the 2017 season. He was a healthy inactive for all but five games of the 2018 season and was not re-signed when his contract expired. After Teʻo did not play for most of the 2019 season, New Orleans re-signed him on December 3, 2019.

=== Chicago Bears ===
On October 20, 2020, Teʻo was signed to the Chicago Bears' practice squad. He was placed on the practice squad/COVID-19 list by the team on December 7, 2020, and restored to the practice squad on December 19. He was elevated to the active roster on January 9, 2021, for the team's wild card playoff loss against the New Orleans Saints, and reverted to the practice squad after the game. His practice squad contract with the team expired after the season on January 18, 2021.

== Career statistics ==
=== NFL ===
Legend
**Bold**	Career high

==== Regular season ====
Year	Team	Games		Tackles					Interceptions					Fumbles			
Year	Team	GP	GS	Cmb	Solo	Ast	Sck	TFL	Int	Yds	TD	Lng	PD	FF	FR	Yds	TD
2013	SD	13	**13**	61	41	20	0.0	6	0	0	0	0	**4**	0	0	0	0
2014	SD	10	6	60	39	**21**	**1.0**	3	**1**	0	0	0	3	0	0	0	0
2015	SD	12	12	**83**	**63**	20	0.5	4	**1**	**11**	0	**11**	2	**1**	0	0	0
2016	SD	3	3	17	11	6	0.0	2	0	0	0	0	0	0	0	0	0
2017	NO	**16**	10	62	42	20	0.0	**7**	0	0	0	0	3	0	**1**	0	0
2018	NO	5	2	18	12	6	0.0	0	0	0	0	0	1	0	0	0	0
2019	NO	3	2	6	4	2	0.0	0	0	0	0	0	0	0	0	0	0
		62	48	307	212	95	1.5	22	2	11	0	11	13	1	1	0	0

==== Playoffs ====
Year	Team	Games		Tackles					Interceptions					Fumbles			
Year	Team	GP	GS	Cmb	Solo	Ast	Sck	TFL	Int	Yds	TD	Lng	PD	FF	FR	Yds	TD
2013	SD	**2**	**2**	10	6	4	0.0	0	0	0	0	0	0	0	0	0	0
2017	NO	**2**	**2**	**15**	**8**	**7**	**1.0**	**1**	0	0	0	0	0	0	0	0	0
2020	CHI	1	1	6	4	2	0.0	0	0	0	0	0	0	0	0	0	0
		5	5	31	18	13	1.0	1	0	0	0	0	0	0	0	0	0

=== College ===
All statistics from Notre Dame Official Athletic Site.

Year	Team	Games	Tackles				Sacks	Pass Defense				Fumbles		Blkd	
Year	Team	Games	Solo	Ast	Total	TFL – Yds	No – Yds	Int – Yds	BU	PD	Qbh	Rcv – Yds	FF	Kick	Saf
2009	Notre Dame	12	29	34	63	5.5 – 25	1.0 – 12	0 – 0	1	1	1	0 – 0	0	0	0
2010	Notre Dame	13	66	67	133	9.5 – 34	1.0 – 7	0 – 0	3	3	3	0 – 0	1	0	0
2011	Notre Dame	13	62	66	128	13.5 – 36	5.0 – 23	0 – 0	2	2	4	0 – 0	1	0	0
2012	Notre Dame	13	55	58	113	5.5 – 19	1.5 – 13	7 – 35	4	11	4	2 – 8	0	0	0
**Career**		51	212	225	437	34.0 – 114	8.5 – 55	7 – 35	10	17	12	2 – 8	2	0	0

== Personal life ==
Teʻo was born in Laie, Hawaii, on January 26, 1991, of Samoan ancestry. He is the son of Brian and Ottilia Teʻo and has five siblings: sisters BrieAnne, Tiare, Eden, Maya and brother Manasseh. In high school, Teʻo had a 3.52 grade-point average and did volunteer work with the Shriners Hospital, Head Start preschool program, Hawai'i Food Bank and Special Olympics. Teʻo also became an Eagle Scout in November 2008. Teʻo is an active member of The Church of Jesus Christ of Latter-day Saints.

In February 2020, Teʻo became engaged to his girlfriend, personal trainer and beauty consultant Jovi Nicole Engbino. The couple married in San Diego, California, on August 29, 2020. Teʻo has a daughter, Hiro Teʻo, born August 12, 2021, and a son, Kyro Teʻo, born January 16, 2023. Teʻo is a close friend of quarterback Tua Tagovailoa, a fellow Samoan NFL player who grew up in Hawaii, and refers to Tagovailoa as his "little brother". Teʻo was a member of Netflix's broadcasting team for the 2024 NFL Christmas day games. In August 2024, NFL Network announced that Teʻo would join the network as an on-air analyst. He is a regular commentator on Good Morning Football.

=== Catfishing incident ===
Teʻo told many media outlets that both his grandmother and his girlfriend had died on September 12, 2012. Teʻo said that his girlfriend, Stanford University student Lennay Kekua, had been injured in a car accident and was discovered during her treatment to have leukemia. Teʻo did not miss any football games for Notre Dame, saying that he had promised Kekua he would play even if something had happened to her. Many sports media outlets reported on these tragedies during Teʻo's strong 2012 season and emergence as a Heisman Trophy candidate.

After receiving an anonymous email tip in January 2013, reporters Timothy Burke and Jack Dickey of the sports blog Deadspin conducted an investigation into Kekua's identity. On January 16, they published an article alleging Kekua did not exist and pointed to a trans woman named Ronaiah "Naya" Tuiasosopo (/roʊˈnaɪə ˌtuːjɑːsoʊˈsoʊpoʊ/ roh-NY-ə TOO-yah-soh-SOH-poh) as involved in the hoax of a relationship with Teʻo. Tuiasosopo has been described as a family friend or acquaintance of Teʻo. Pictures of Kekua that had been published in the media were actually of a former high school classmate of Tuiasosopo.

On the same day the Deadspin article was published, Notre Dame issued a statement that "Manti had been the victim of what appears to be a hoax in which someone using the fictitious name Lennay Kekua apparently ingratiated herself with Manti and then conspired with others to lead him to believe she had tragically died of leukemia." In a press conference, Notre Dame athletic director Jack Swarbrick confirmed the university had hired private investigators to uncover the source of the hoax, and he clarified that Teʻo's relationship with Kekua was "exclusively an online relationship". This conflicted with previous accounts from Teʻo and his family that the couple had first met after a football game. Swarbrick then visited Teʻo in Hawaii. Swarbrick said Teʻo informed Notre Dame of the hoax on December 26, 2012, after receiving a phone call on December 6 from the woman he knew as Kekua, claiming she was still alive. However, Teʻo mentioned Kekua's death in at least four separate interviews in the days following the phone call.

In response to the growing suspicions that he was involved in the hoax, Teʻo agreed to a January 18, 2013, interview with sports journalist Jeremy Schaap in which he maintained his innocence. Teʻo explained he had lied to his father and others about meeting her in person because he thought he would be seen as "crazy" for having a serious relationship with a woman he had never met in person. Teʻo said he was angered and confused by the December 6 phone call and had continued to speak of Kekua because the situation was unclear to him. Teʻo further explained that Tuiasosopo claimed to be a cousin of Lennay Kekua and that the two of them had communicated online over the last several years and met once in person at the 2012 Notre Dame/USC game. Teʻo said Tuiasosopo admitted responsibility for the hoax in a telephone conversation on January 16.

In a January 24, 2013, interview on Katie with Katie Couric, Teʻo played three voicemails left by Kekua and said the voice "sounds like a girl". In an appearance on Dr. Phil on January 31 and February 1, Tuiasosopo confessed to the hoax and admitted to falling in love with Teʻo and using the Kekua identity. Tuiasosopo also recreated the female voice behind a privacy screen. Relatives of Tuiasosopo told the New York Post that Kekua's voice belonged to Tuiasosopo's cousin. Despite the revelation Kekua did not exist, NFL player Reagan Maui'a said he met someone twice, claiming to be Kekua, and they had been introduced by Tuiasosopo, whom he believed to be Kekua's cousin. Teʻo's experience was the subject of a Netflix documentary, Untold: The Girlfriend Who Didn't Exist, which was released in August 2022.

=== Other ventures ===
Teʻo is the owner of Teʻo Legacy, a property management company. As of 2024, the company owns 20 properties in the Cleveland area.
