= New York Daily News =

Daily tabloid newspaper based in New Jersey

- New York's Hometown Newspaper

- Front page from June 24, 2026
- Type: Daily newspaper
- Format: Tabloid
- Owner: Daily News Enterprises
- Editor: Andrew Julien
- Founded: June 24, 1919; 107 years ago (as Illustrated Daily News)
- Political alignment: Populist
- Headquarters: 125 Theodore Conrad Drive, Jersey City, New Jersey, 07305
- Country: United States
- Circulation: 29,500 average print circulation
- ISSN: 2692-1251 (print); 2692-126X (web)
- OCLC number: 9541172
- Website: www.nydailynews.com

The Daily News, widely known as the New York Daily News, is an American newspaper outlet based in Jersey City, New Jersey. It was founded in 1919 by Joseph Medill Patterson in New York City as the Illustrated Daily News. It was the first U.S. daily printed in tabloid format, and reached its peak circulation in 1947, at 2.4 million copies a day. For much of the 20th century, the paper operated out of the historic art deco Daily News Building in Manhattan, with its large globe in the lobby. Today's Daily News is not connected to the earlier New York Daily News, which shut down in 1906.

The Daily News is owned by parent company Daily News Enterprises. This company is owned by Alden Global Capital and was formed when Alden, which also owns news media publisher Digital First Media, purchased then-owner Tribune Publishing in May 2021, and then separated the Daily News from Tribune to form Daily News Enterprises upon the closing of the Tribune acquisition.

== History ==
=== Illustrated Daily News ===
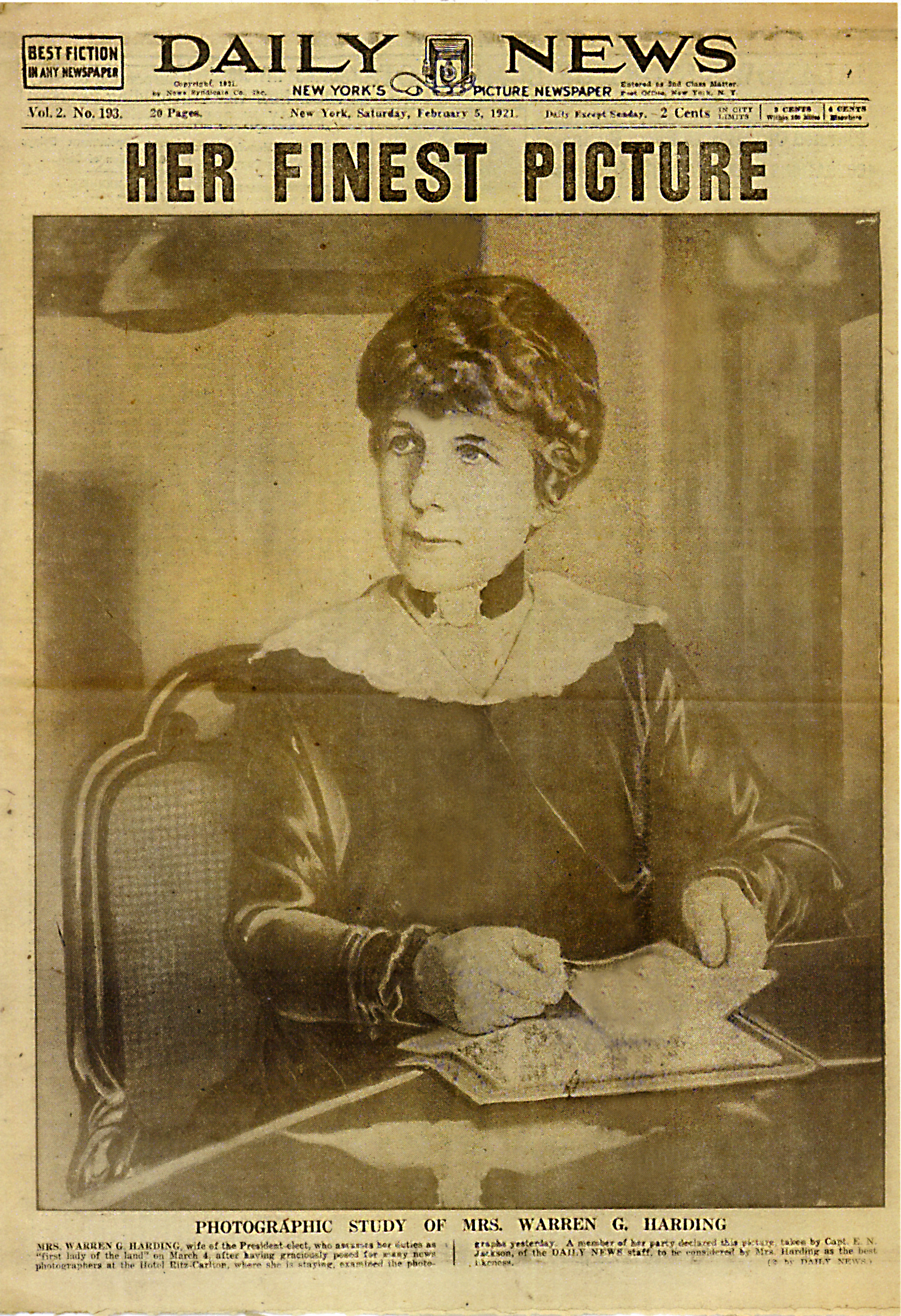
Front page from February 5, 1921, featuring Florence Harding, wife of President-elect Warren G. Harding

The Illustrated Daily News was founded by Joseph Medill Patterson and his cousin Robert R. McCormick. The two were co-publishers of the Chicago Tribune and grandsons of Tribune Company founder Joseph Medill, in imitation of the successful British newspaper Daily Mirror. Patterson and McCormick could not agree on the editorial content of the Chicago newspaper, so they decided at a meeting in Paris that Patterson would work on launching a Tribune-owned newspaper in New York. On his return, Patterson met with Alfred Harmsworth, Viscount Northcliffe, and the publisher of the Daily Mirror. He was impressed with the advantages of a tabloid, so he launched the Daily News on June 24, 1919 as Illustrated Daily News.

The Tribune Company published the Chicago Tribune until 2021, and it also owned the News Syndicate Company, Inc. which published The Daily News until 1993.

=== Daily News ===
The Daily News was not an immediate success, and by August 1919, the paper's circulation had dropped to 26,625. Still, many of New York's subway commuters found the tabloid format easier to handle, and readership steadily grew. By the time of the paper's first anniversary in June 1920, circulation had climbed over 100,000 and by 1925 over a million. Circulation reached its peak in 1947, at 2.4 million daily and 4.7 million on Sunday.

The Daily News carried the slogan "New York's Picture Newspaper" from 1920 to 1991 for its emphasis on photographs. A camera has been part of the newspaper's logo from day one. It became one of the first newspapers in New York City to employ a woman as a staff photographer in 1942 when Evelyn Straus was hired. The paper's later slogan, developed from a 1985 ad campaign, is "New York's Hometown Newspaper", while another was "The Eyes, the Ears, the Honest Voice of New York". The Daily News continues to include large and prominent photographs, for news, entertainment, and sports, as well as intense city news coverage, celebrity gossip, classified ads, comics, a sports section, and an opinion section.

News-gathering operations were, for a time, organized by staff using two-way radios operating on 173.3250 MHz (radio station KEA 871), allowing the assignment desk to communicate with its reporters who used a fleet of "radio cars". Excelling in sports coverage, prominent sports cartoonists have included Bill Gallo, Bruce Stark, and Ed Murawinski. Columnists have included Walter Kaner. Editorial cartoonists have included C. D. Batchelor. In 1948, the News established WPIX (Channel 11 in New York City), and later bought what became WPIX-FM, which is now known as WFAN-FM. The television station became a Tribune property outright in 1991, while the radio station was purchased by Emmis Communications in 1997.

The paper briefly published a Monday-Friday afternoon counterpart, Daily News Tonight, between August 19, 1980, and August 28, 1981; this competed with the New York Post, which had launched a morning edition to complement its evening newspaper in 1978. Occasional "P.M. Editions" were published as extras in 1991, during the brief tenure of Robert Maxwell as publisher. From August 10 to November 5, 1978, the multi-union 1978 New York City newspaper strike shut down the three major New York City newspapers. No editions of the News were printed during this time.

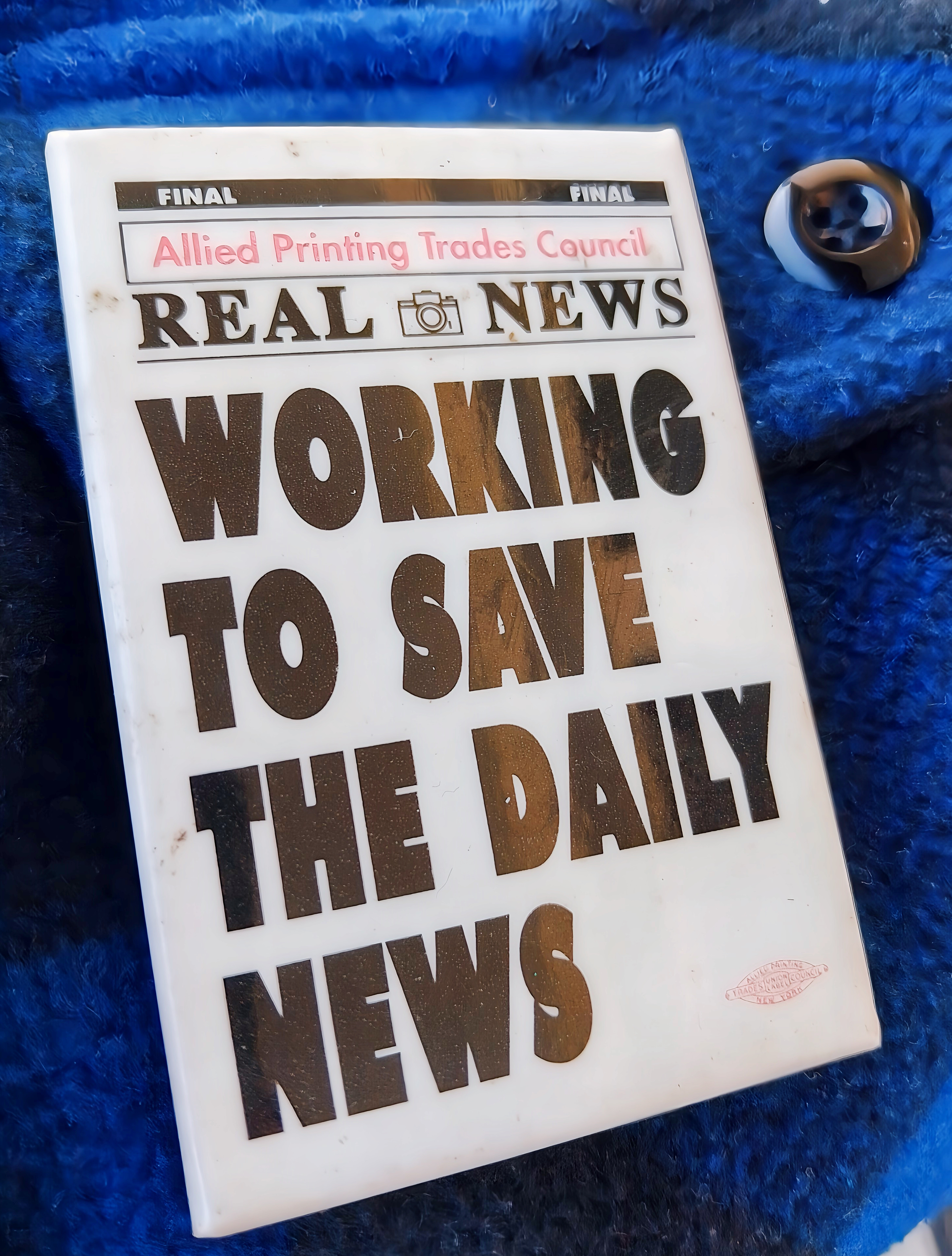
In October 1990, the Allied Printing Trades Council (APTC) organized a strike at the New York Daily News. This button badge shows a mock newspaper front page, with the masthead "Real News," including a camera logo like in the Daily News' own, and the headline, "Working to Save the Daily News."

In 1982 and again in the early 1990s during a newspaper strike, the Daily News almost went out of business. In the 1982 instance, the parent Tribune Company offered the tabloid up for sale. In 1991, millionaire Robert Maxwell offered financial assistance to the News to help it stay in business. Upon his death later that year, the News seceded from his publishing empire which soon splintered under questions about whether Maxwell had the financial backing to sustain it. Existing management, led by editor James Willse, held the News together in bankruptcy; Willse became interim publisher after buying the paper from the Tribune Company. Mort Zuckerman bought the paper in 1993.

In January 2012, former News of the World and New York Post editor Colin Myler was appointed editor-in-chief of the Daily News. Myler was replaced by his deputy Jim Rich in September 2015. The Daily News at one time maintained local bureaus in the Bronx, Brooklyn, and Queens, which were discontinued in 2015. Since then, the Daily News has no longer had staff who focused exclusively on one borough. As of May 2016, it was the ninth-most widely circulated daily newspaper in the United States. In 2019, it was ranked eleventh.

On September 4, 2017, Tronc (now Tribune Publishing), the publishing operations of the former Tribune Company (which had spun out its publishing assets to separate them from its broadcast assets), announced that it had acquired the Daily News. Tronc had bought the Daily News for $1, assuming "operational and pension liabilities". By the time of purchase, circulation had dropped to 200,000 on weekdays and 260,000 on Sundays. In July 2018, Tronc fired half of the paper's editorial staff, including the editor-in-chief, Jim Rich. Rich was replaced by Robert York, Publisher and Editor-in-Chief of Tronc-owned The Morning Call in Allentown, Pennsylvania. The paper's social media staff were included in the cut; images and memes that were later deleted were posted on its Twitter feed. In 2020, amid a switch to remote work caused by the COVID-19 pandemic, the Daily News closed its newsroom in Lower Manhattan.

Tribune Publishing was acquired by Alden Global Capital in May 2021. Upon the close of the deal, the Daily News was transferred to a separate company owned by Alden, Daily News Enterprises. In September 2021, editor Robert York left and was replaced on an interim basis by Andrew Julien, who also serves as the editor and publisher of The Hartford Courant. Staff continued to leave after Alden's acquisition; in a three-month period in 2022, twelve reporters, representing one-fifth of the newsroom staff, resigned.The paper was also printed in a Sunday edition called Sunday News until 1977.

== Editorial stance and style ==
The New York Times journalist Alan Feuer wrote, in 2015, that the Daily News focuses heavily on "deep sourcing and doorstep reporting", providing city-centered "crime reportage and hard-hitting coverage of public issues ... rather than portraying New York through the partisan divide between liberals and conservatives". According to Feuer, the paper is known for "speaking to and for the city's working class" and for "its crusades against municipal misconduct". The New York Times has described the Daily News's editorial stance as "flexibly centrist", with a "high-minded, if populist, legacy". In contrast to its sister publication, the Chicago Tribune, the Daily News was pro-Roosevelt, endorsing him in 1932, 1936, and 1940. It broke from the president in 1941 over foreign policy.

From the 1940s through the 1960s, the Daily News espoused conservative populism. By the mid-1970s, it began shifting its stance, and during the 1990s gained a reputation as a moderately liberal alternative to the conservative New York Post, which until 1980 had been a Democratic bastion. The newspaper endorsed Republican George W. Bush in the 2004 presidential election, Democrat Barack Obama in 2008, Republican Mitt Romney in 2012, Democrat Hillary Clinton in 2016, and Democrat Joe Biden in 2020. The paper did not make a presidential endorsement for the 2024 race.

== Headquarters ==
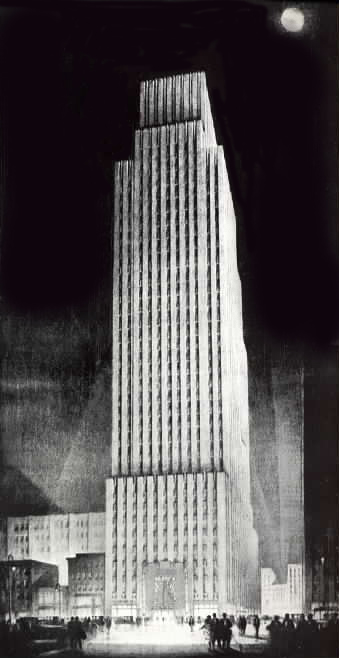
Daily News Building, John Mead Howells and Raymond Hood, architects, rendering by Hugh Ferriss. The building housed the paper until the mid-1990s.

From its founding, it was based at 25 City Hall Place, just north of City Hall, and close to Park Row, the traditional home of the city's newspaper trade. In 1921, it moved to 23 Park Place, which was in the same neighborhood. The cramped conditions demanded a much larger space for the growing newspaper.

From 1929 to 1995, the Daily News was based in 220 East 42nd Street near Second Avenue, an official city and national landmark designed by John Mead Howells and Raymond Hood. The paper moved to 450 West 33rd Street (also known as 5 Manhattan West) in 1995, but the 42nd Street location is still known as The News Building and still features a giant globe and weather instruments in its lobby. It was the model for the Daily Planet building of the first two Superman films. The former News subsidiary WPIX-TV remains in the building. The subsequent headquarters of the Daily News at 450 West 33rd Street straddled the railroad tracks going into Pennsylvania Station. The building is now the world headquarters of the Associated Press and is part of Manhattan West.

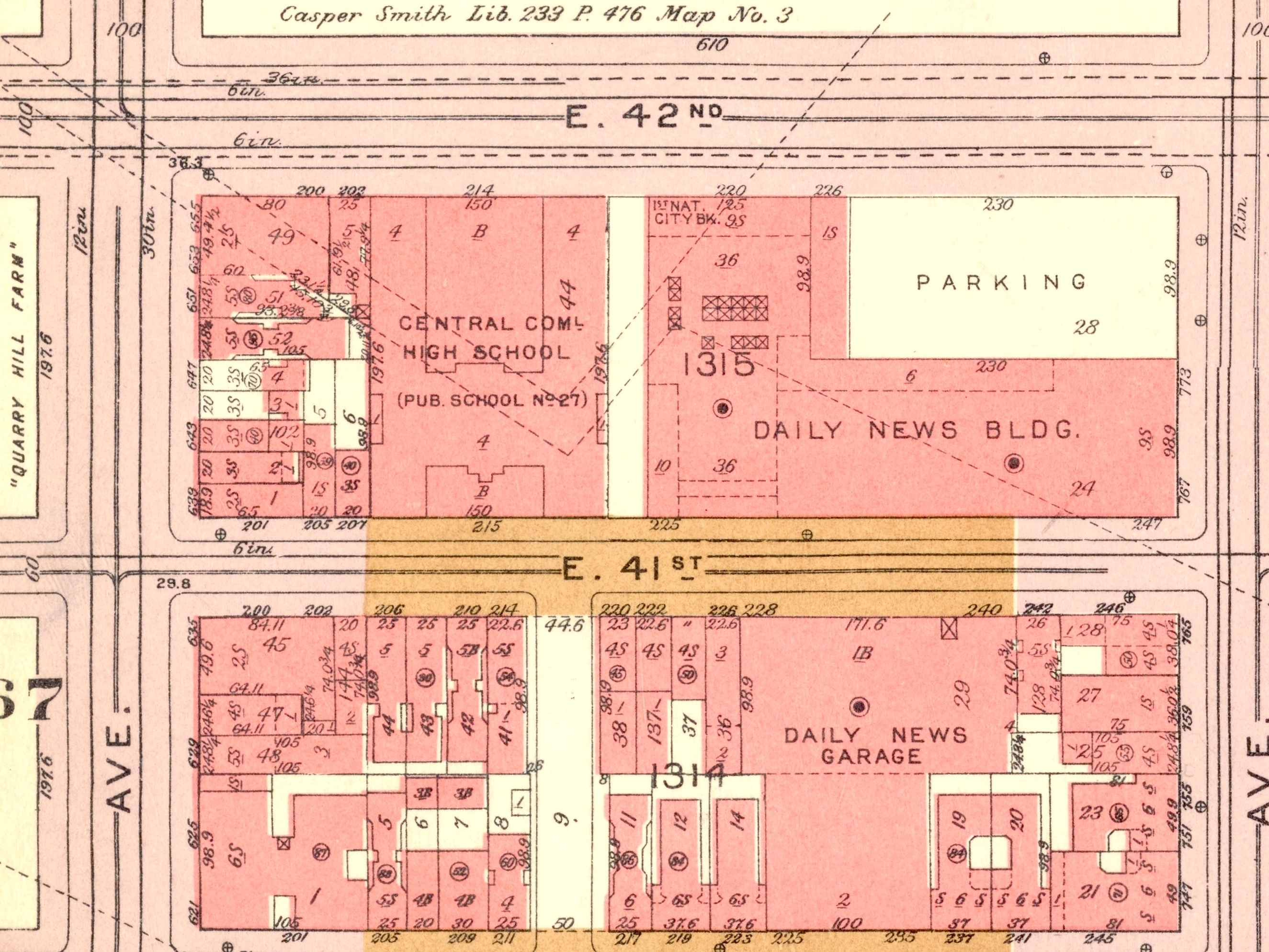
Map of New York Daily News building and garage, circa 1955

In June 2011, the paper moved its operations to two floors at 4 New York Plaza in lower Manhattan. Sixteen months later, the structure was severely damaged and rendered uninhabitable by flooding from Hurricane Sandy. In the immediate aftermath, news operations were conducted remotely from several temporary locations, eventually moving to office space at the Jersey City printing plant. In early 2013, operations moved to rented space at 1290 Avenue of the Americas near Rockefeller Center—just four blocks north of its rival New York Post. The staff returned to the permanent 4 New York Plaza location in early November 2013. In August 2020, the Daily News closed its Manhattan headquarters.

== Printing facilities ==
In 1993, the Daily News consolidated its printing facilities near Liberty State Park in Jersey City, New Jersey. In 2009, the paper spent $150 million on printing presses as part of its change to full-color photographs. In 2011, the company spent $100 million to buy three new presses, using a $41.7 million Urban Transit Hub Tax Credit from the State of New Jersey. In 2022, the company closed its Jersey City printing plant and outsource its printing operations to North Jersey Media Group.

== Pulitzer Prizes ==
The Daily News has won eleven Pulitzer Prizes. In 1998, Daily News columnist Mike McAlary won the Pulitzer Prize for Commentary for his multi-part series of columns (published in 1997) on Abner Louima, who was sodomized and tortured by New York City police officers.

In 2007, the News' editorial board, which comprised Arthur Browne, Beverly Weintraub, and Heidi Evans, won the Pulitzer Prize for Editorial Writing for a series of thirteen editorials, published over five months, that detailed how more than 12,000 rescue workers who responded after the September 11 attacks had become ill from toxins in the air. The Pulitzer citation said that the award was given to the paper "for its compassionate and compelling editorials on behalf of Ground Zero workers, whose health problems were neglected by the city and the nation."

In 2017, the Daily News was awarded the Pulitzer Prize for Public Service in collaboration with non-profit ProPublica "for uncovering, primarily through the work of reporter Sarah Ryley, widespread abuse of eviction rules by the police to oust hundreds of people, most of them poor minorities."

== Noteworthy front pages ==
Like its rival, the aforementioned Post, the paper has become quite known for its many puns, particularly on its back and/or front covers.

In 1928, a News reporter strapped a small camera to his leg, and shot a photo of Ruth Snyder being executed in the electric chair. The next day's newspaper carried the headline "DEAD!". On October 29, 1975, President Gerald Ford gave a speech denying federal assistance to spare New York City from bankruptcy. The front page of the Daily News the next day read "FORD TO CITY: DROP DEAD". Ford later said the headline had played a role in his losing the 1976 presidential election.

On November 16, 1995, the Daily News front page displayed an illustration of Newt Gingrich as a baby in a diaper with the headline "Crybaby", following revelations that Gingrich had shut down the government in retaliation for a perceived snub from Bill Clinton aboard Air Force One.

On May 12, 2003, the Daily News front page read "JFK Had a Monica", reporting historian Robert Dallek's book on JFK's affair with a White House intern—long before the infamous Clinton-Lewinsky scandal just five years prior to the publication, and in turn, compelled the former intern, Mimi Alford, to come forward. The Daily News ran another front page title on May 16, which read "Mimi Breaks Her Silence", and then another article the next day titled "JFK & MIMI: Why It Matters."

In the year leading up to the 2016 presidential election, the paper's headlines became more provocative, helping to rejuvenate it, and with more opinionated editorials with the aforementioned headlines, once again in an effort to demonstrate its place in the city's media.

Following the 2015 San Bernardino shooting, in which 14 people were killed, the paper's front page read "God isn't fixing this", with images of tweets from Republican politicians offering thoughts and prayers. The paper advocated for tighter gun laws, condemning what it described as "empty platitudes and angry rhetoric" rather than action "in response to the ongoing plague of gun violence in our country." The provocative headline received both praise and criticism.

In January 2016, after Republican senator and presidential candidate Ted Cruz of Texas disparaged "New York values" in a Republican primary debate, the News responded with a cover page headline reading "DROP DEAD, TED" and showing the Statue of Liberty giving the middle finger.

== Controversies ==
On December 20, 2016, Daily News columnist Gersh Kuntzman compared the assassination of Andrei Karlov (the Russian Ambassador to Turkey) to that of Nazi German diplomat Ernst vom Rath by Jewish student Herschel Grynszpan, saying "justice has been served." Since 2018, the Daily News has prevented internet users in the European Union from accessing its website, on grounds of missing data protection compliance.

== See also ==
- Media in New York City
