= Sidney L. James =

American journalist

Sidney James (died March 11, 2004) was an executive journalist. He was a longtime journalist and executive with Time-Life and the founding managing editor of Sports Illustrated magazine. He was credited with helping make the magazine a success, when Time-Life thought it would fail.

== Career ==
James began working for Time-Life in 1929 as a stringer. In 1936, he joined the staff full-time working as a writer, editor, and national correspondent in New York City, Chicago, and Los Angeles. In 1940, William Saroyan lists him among "contributing editors" at Time in the play, Love's Old Sweet Song.

In 1960, he became publisher of Sports Illustrated, a job he held for five years. In the late 1960s James was Time's Inc.'s vice president in Washington. He decided to retire in 1974 and moved to Laguna Hills, California. He was a member of the Peabody Awards Board of Jurors from 1975 to 1979 and Chair from 1977 to 1979.

== Books ==
He wrote about his long career in journalism in the 1994 book, "Press Pass: A Journalist's Tale."

== Family ==
James had two sons, Christopher and Timothy; two daughters, Mary and Sidney; eight grandchildren and two great-grandchildren.

== Death ==
He died of cardiopulmonary arrest and prostate cancer at a nursing home in Alameda, California, at the age of 97.
