= Merrill Brown =

American journalist

- Born: Philadelphia, Pennsylvania, U.S.
- Education: Washington University in St. Louis
- Occupations: The News Project; Founder
- Known for: •MSNBC.com; Founding Editor-in-Chief •Court TV •Montclair State University; Former Director, School of Communication and Media

Merrill Brown is a media executive and journalist. In addition to writing for The Washington Post, he launched MSNBC.com and was the website’s founding editor-in-chief. He is the former Director of the School of Communication and Media at Montclair State University. Brown is founder of The News Project.

== Career ==
=== Journalist ===
Brown was associated with The Washington Post from 1979 to 1985, serving as a financial reporter (1979–1982), New York City financial correspondent (1982–1984) and director of business development, Washington Post Company (1984–1985). Prior to that, Brown wrote for The Washington Star (1978–1979), Media General Newspapers (1975–1978), the Winston-Salem Sentinel (1974–1975) and the St. Louis Post Dispatch (1973–1974).

Brown was a member of the Peabody Awards Board of Jurors from 1988 to 1991.

On January 10, 2023, it was announced that Brown was appointed as the editorial director for G/O Media. On June 30, he announced a decision to test AI-generated content on the company's portfolio of media websites, and was met with opposition from the different editorial teams across the portfolio.

=== Launching Court TV, MSNBC.com ===
Brown was a member of the 1991 launch team for the cable network Court TV. From 1990-1994, he oversaw public relations and the development of the network's day-to-day management structure.

In 1996, Brown helped launch MSNBC.com, and was the website’s first editor-in-chief. He was responsible for connecting Microsoft’s “technology wizards” and NBC’s “news hounds,” developing the relationships between MSNBC on the Internet, based in Redmond, Washington, and MSNBC Cable, based in New Jersey. He went on to become senior vice president in August 2000 and during his tenure, the company grew to become one of the most visited news offerings on the Internet.

=== Media consultant ===
In the spring of 2005, he prepared a report for the Carnegie Corporation of New York, which examined young peoples' changing media consumption habits. The report was referenced later that year in a speech to the American Society of Magazine Editors. In 2012, Brown co-authored a report with Larry Kramer, publisher of USA Today, about the future of the PBS NewsHour. The report, commissioned by the Bill & Melinda Gates Foundation, called on the program to “modernize news-gathering production.”

=== Montclair State University ===
In 2012, Brown was appointed as the inaugural Director of the School of Communication and Media at Montclair State University.

=== Board work ===
Brown has served on the boards of directors for GoLocal24, Revenue.com and MedCity News. He is also an advisor to Capture Media Inc., Dstillery, Mixpo and is a member of the advisory board of the City University of New York Graduate School of Journalism.

Previously Brown was chairman of the board at NowPublic. Brown has also served on the board of Smashing Ideas Inc.

=== The News Project ===
In 2018 Brown formed The News Project with founding partners Charming Robot, 10up, Mark Walsh and other investors supporting the platform, which includes technology from Piano.
