= Tim Burke (journalist) =

American sports journalist

Timothy Burke
- Born: 1977 or 1978 (age 47–48)
- Occupations: Sports journalist, media consultant
- Years active: 2006–present

Timothy Burke is an American sports journalist and media consultant who is known for his video and GIF clips. He was a staffer for Deadspin from 2011 to 2018 and runs a consulting firm based out of Tampa, Florida. Burke was arrested and indicted on federal charges of conspiracy in February 2024 following the publication of unaired footage from Fox News talk show Tucker Carlson Tonight, which prompted an FBI search of his home.

== Early life ==
Burke is from Ohio and graduated from Ohio University with a bachelor's degree in journalism. He earned a master's degree in communication from Eastern Michigan University before moving to Florida, where he pursued a doctorate in communication studies at the University of South Florida.

== Career ==
While at the University of South Florida in 2006, Burke created the blog Mocksession.com, which captured "esoteric" screengrabs and clips from live sports broadcasts, including in GIF form. He later joined SportsGrid as a video coordinator.

Burke provided video content and wrote articles for Deadspin from 2011 to 2018. He was known for publishing videos and animated GIFs of offbeat and unusual moments during live sports and news broadcasts, which were posted to the Deadspin website and Twitter under the name @bubbaprog. Burke began video captures of live broadcasts in 2008 with a TV tuner that fed into a laptop; by 2013, his capture setup included a variety of computer servers, receivers, and tuners that could record up to 28 simultaneous broadcasts. Burke's content included awkward moments for sportscasters and fans, on-field incidents, bloopers, and errors in news broadcasts.

He also co-wrote an investigative piece for Deadspin with Jack Dickey in 2013 that uncovered the false identity of college football player Manti Te'o's alleged girlfriend and her purported death. The story was later adapted into the Netflix documentary Untold: The Girlfriend Who Didn't Exist in 2022, which featured interviews of Burke and Dickey. He left Deadspin in 2018 following several contract buyouts at Gawker Media under their new ownership. Burke was later the director of video at The Daily Beast. He also published a video collage of news anchors at 45 local Sinclair Broadcasting television stations reading an identical script about fake news in 2018; the video subsequently went viral and received national attention. Burke also ran other projects, such as Twitter bots that posted breaking news based on closed caption feeds of news networks, alongside his video content.

He founded Burke Communications, a media and political consulting company, in 2019. Among his clients were HBO and ESPN.

=== Tucker Carlson case ===
Burke was the source of two leaked clips from Tucker Carlson Tonight, a Fox News talk show, that were published by Vice in October 2022 and Media Matters for America in April 2023. The clips showed host Tucker Carlson, who left Fox News shortly before Media Matters published the footage, making sexist and "uncouth remarks"; the Vice clip included discussions between Carlson and rapper Kanye West that included anti-Semitic material. Burke's home was raided and searched by the Federal Bureau of Investigation on May 8, 2023, serving a warrant related to the Tucker Carlson case according to the Tampa Bay Times. Sixteen computers, two hard drives, and two cell phones were seized as part of the investigation.

On February 22, 2024, Burke was arrested and issued with 14 federal charges related to the case, including one count of conspiracy and several counts of wiretapping. The indictment alleges that the footage had been obtained from an internal video system through "compromised credentials" by Burke and another person. Burke's lawyers claim that the video feeds were found through publicly accessible but hidden URLs on streaming service LiveU; they were allegedly not secured by a password, though other reports indicate Burke and his co-conspirator misappropriated credentials belonging to CBS News that were accidentally posted on a radio station website.

The case has been criticized by the Freedom of Press Foundation and American Civil Liberties Union for breaches of the freedom of press.

== Personal life ==
Burke is married to Lynn Hurtak, a member of the Tampa City Council since 2022. They live in the Seminole Heights neighborhood of Tampa, Florida. Burke is on the board of directors for Jobsite Theater, a Tampa-based nonprofit theater company.
