= Sarah Ryley =

American journalist

Sarah Ryley is an American journalist working as an investigative and data reporter at the Boston Globe. Previously, she was an investigative reporter at The Trace (website), a non-profit news outlet that covers gun violence in America, and an editor and investigative journalist at the New York Daily News.

The Daily News and ProPublica were joint recipients of the 2017 Pulitzer Prize for Public Service for Ryley's extensive reporting on the New York Police Department's "widespread abuse of eviction rules by the police to oust hundreds of people, most of them poor minorities." While at the Daily News, Ryley also reported extensively on the NYPD's "Broken Windows" policing tactics, which resulted in sweeping reforms.

== Early life and education ==
Ryley was born in Toledo, Ohio, and studied journalism at Wayne State University in Detroit.

== Career ==
Ryley joined the New York Daily News in 2012. Her work exposing racial disparities in the New York Police Department's practice of issuing summonses for low-level offenses resulted in the passage of the Criminal Justice Reform Act. Her investigation into the police department's use of the nuisance abatement law to push people from their businesses and homes, co-published with ProPublica, was awarded the Pulitzer Prize for Public Service in 2017 and resulted in the passage of the Nuisance Abatement Fairness Act.

== Awards ==
- 2017, Pulitzer Prize for Public Service, "Nuisance Abatement" (presented jointly to the New York Daily News and ProPublica)
