= Jonathan Mahler =

American journalist (born 1969)

Jonathan Mahler (born 1969) is an American journalist, and writer. He currently works for The New York Times.

He was a columnist for Bloomberg View. His work appeared in Slate, Daily Beast, and New York magazine.

== Works ==
- The Lexus Story
- Ladies and Gentlemen, the Bronx Is Burning
- The Challenge: Hamdan v. Rumsfeld and the Fight over Presidential Power
- The Gods of New York: Egotists, Idealists, Opportunists, and the Birth of the Modern City: 1986-1990. 2025.
