= Inverse (website) =

American online magazine

- Website type: Online magazine
- Available in: English
- Founded: August 12, 2015; 11 years ago
- Headquarters: New York City, {{{location_country}}}
- Founders: Dave Nemetz; Winton Welsh; Steve Marshall; Michael Schaefermeyer; John Degner
- Key people: Dave Nemetz (Founder & CEO); Winton Welsh (CTO)
- Employees: 30
- Parent: Bustle Digital Group
- Website: inverse.com
- Current status: Active

Inverse is an online magazine from Bustle Digital Group, covering topics such as technology, science, and culture for a millennial audience.

== History ==
Logo before 2020 redesign

Launched in 2015 by Dave Nemetz, co-founder of Bleacher Report, the site was made possible through seed funding with its headquarters in San Francisco, California and the editorial staff initially based in Brooklyn, New York.

The company raised a $6 million Series A funding in 2016, led by Crosslink Capital with participation from Bertelsmann Digital Media Investments.

In 2017, the headquarters was moved to SoHo, Manhattan, New York City with an expanded staff of approximately 30 full-time employees and 25 freelancers. In September 2017, the company debuted two shows on the Facebook Watch platform.

On August 15, 2018, six staff writers (15 percent of the staff) were laid off after it was reported that the site's monthly unique visitors went down from 7.2 million in July 2017 to 5.7 million. The site's traffic jumped back up in 2018, averaging just above 7 million total visits a month.

On July 23, 2019, Bustle Digital Group announced they had purchased Inverse. Inverse debuted a new design created by Bustle titled "Inverse 2.0" on January 22, 2020. In January 2026, Bustle Digital Group closed Inverse's gaming section with layoffs that left the magazine with a "skeleton crew Entertainment Team".

== Leadership team ==
As founder, Nemetz is CEO of the company, while other co-founders include Winton Welsh (CTO), Steve Marshall (Head of Product and Design) and senior engineers, Michael Schaefermeyer and John Degner. All previously worked with Nemetz at Bleacher Report, but Marshall, Schaefermeyer, and Degner are no longer at the company. They appeared on Business Insider's Silicon Alley 100 list in 2015.

Inverse's executive editor is Nick Lucchesi.

In December 2017, David Spiegel, formerly of CNN and BuzzFeed, joined the staff as chief revenue officer. He left the next year for New York magazine.
