= List of Indianapolis 500 pole-sitters =

Indianapolis 500 Pole Position
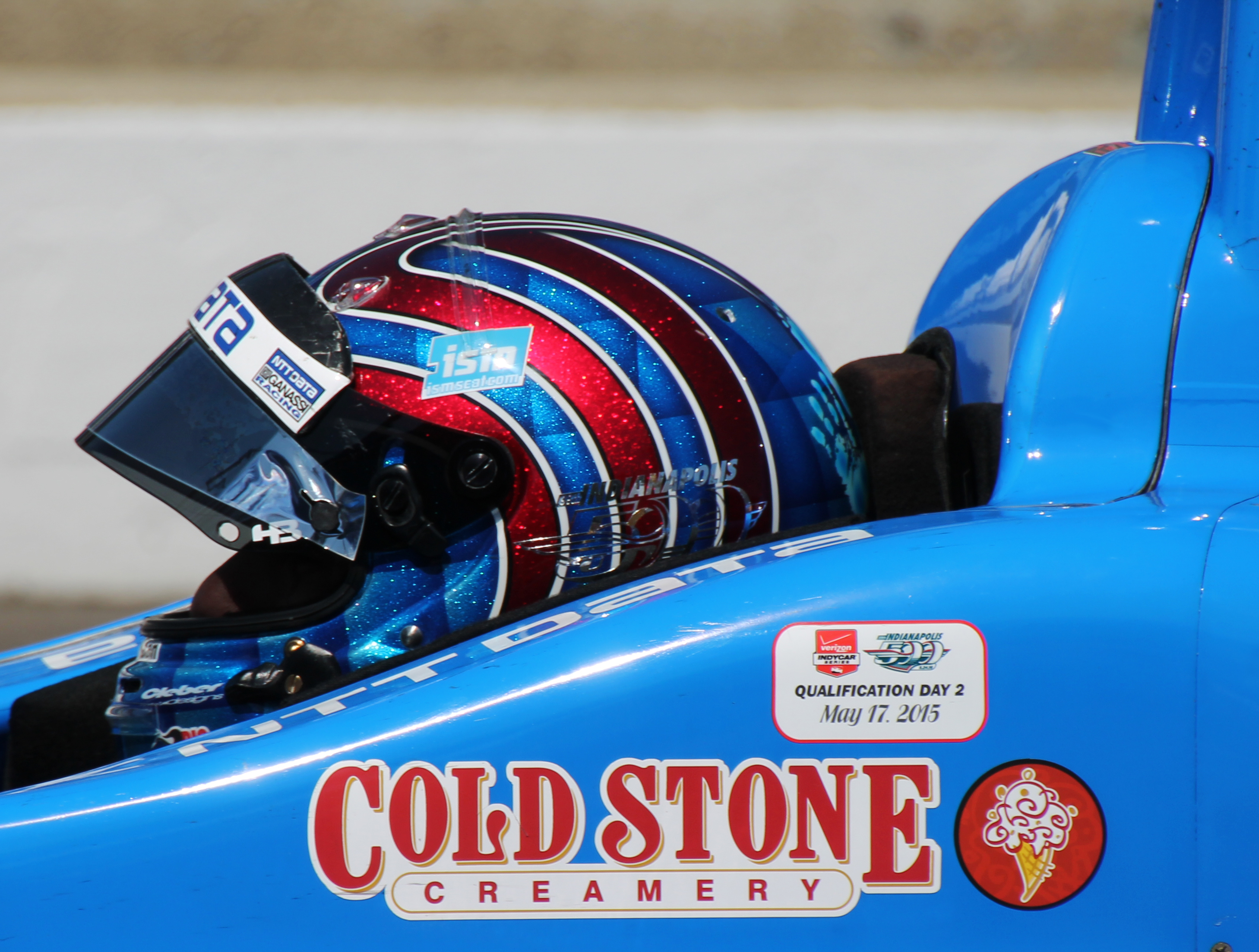
- A qualification day participation sticker on Tony Kanaan's car in 2015
- Sport: American open-wheel car racing
- Competition: Indianapolis 500
- Discipline: IndyCar Series
- Awarded for: Pole Position for the Indianapolis 500
- English name: Nippon Telegraph and Telephone P1 Award

History
- First award: 1911
- Editions: 109
- First winner: Lewis Strang (1911)
- Most wins: Rick Mears (6)
- Most recent: Alex Palou (2026)

The Indianapolis 500 pole-sitter is the driver who places first in qualifying for the annual Indianapolis 500 (also called the Indianapolis 500-Mile Race), (Note: It was called the International 500-Mile Sweepstakes Race in 1911, the Liberty Sweepstakes in 1919, and the International 500-Mile Sweepstakes Race again from 1920 to 1980.) an American open-wheel car race held on American Memorial Day weekend at the Indianapolis Motor Speedway (IMS), in Speedway, Indiana. The pole-sitter begins the race in pole position, at the inside of the front of the starting grid.

Since 1989, the pole-sitter has received a cash prize, currently $100,000, (Note: The prize money was initially $6,000, before being increased to $10,000, $22,500, $25,000 and finally $27,500.) and they and their car owner receive a small trophy at a ceremony that takes place after qualifying. (Note: Drivers who took the pole position on the first day of qualifying were presented with the 33 in (2.8 ft) gold Robert M. Bowes Memorial Trophy that was named after car owner Robert M. Bowes and established by Bowes Seal Fast employees in 1946. The Walter E. Lyon Memorial Trophy was later presented to the fastest qualifying driver.) The award is currently sponsored by Nippon Telegraph and Telephone; past sponsors include Anheuser-Busch through its Budweiser brand, PPG Industries, MBNA America Bank, WorldPoints Visa Card, AAMCO Transmissions, Peak Performance Motor Oil, and Verizon.

The race has been held annually since 1911 except in 1917 and 1918 due to World War I and from 1942 to 1945 because of World War II. Out of the 108 completed Indianapolis 500s (as of the 2025 race), the driver that has started in first place has gone on to win the race 21 times.

The qualifying speed format has been changed four times since the first race in 1911. The starting grid for the first race was determined by the date the IMS received entries, and all cars had to reach 75 mph (121 km/h) on a quarter-mile part of the main straight. This was adjusted to drivers averaging 75 mph (121 km/h) on the whole track in 1912, while the starting grid was still set by the order IMS received postal entries. A blind draw was conducted in both 1913 and 1914 once drivers reached the 75 mph (121 km/h) minimum speed. The qualifying format was revised in 1915 so that the grid was determined by drivers' speeds over a single lap, with a minimum speed of 80 mph (130 km/h). From 1920 to 1932, drivers set the starting order by completing four-lap (10 mi (16 km)) qualifying runs at a set minimum speed between 80 and 95 mph (129 and 153 km/h). From 1933 to 1938, it was a ten-lap (25 mi (40 km)) qualifying speed format with cars carrying 3 US gal (11 L; 2.5 imp gal) of fuel. The four-lap speed format was reinstated in 1939, and the minimum speed requirement was dropped after 1963.

Qualifying is held on the Saturday (Bump Day) and Sunday (Pole Day) of the weekend preceding the event, whereas qualifying was formerly held over two weekends. Several qualifying systems have been used. From 2005 to 2009, pole position through eleventh was determined on the first day of qualifying, with the rest of the grid order set over the next three days. Since 2010, drivers have competed in a knockout-style qualifying system and some qualifiers are awarded season points towards the IndyCar Series championship. The top 12 cars from the first day proceed to the second round the following day, and the top six drivers from that round advance to the third and final round, which determines the top six starting places, including pole position.

In early decades, the qualifying order was set by teams presenting their cars in a queue beginning at the garage area. Since 1965, a blind draw is held the night before to determine it. Since 1971, every car has been guaranteed at least one attempt to qualify in the pole-position round, even if weather or other circumstances interfered. After World War II, drivers received three warm-up laps, which dropped to two in 1982. Unlike other IndyCar events, each driver completes a four-lap qualifying run with no other cars on track across two days, and their average speed over each lap is used to determine their final starting position.

As of the 2023 race, 67 drivers have won the pole position. Rick Mears holds the record for the most: six. Scott Dixon has five, while Hélio Castroneves, A. J. Foyt, and Rex Mays are third with four poles. Eleven drivers have qualified in the pole position for two consecutive years, but no one has won in three years in a row. Mays and Cliff Bergere are the youngest and oldest Indianapolis 500 pole winners, qualifying on pole at the ages of 22 years, 81 days in 1935 and 49 years, and 175 days in 1946, respectively. Scott McLaughlin and Gil Andersen set the fastest and slowest four-lap average pole speeds of 234.220 mph (376.941 km/h) in 2024 and 80.93 mph (130.24 km/h) in 1912, respectively.

== Procedure ==
Speeds were recorded by the front wheels of cars travelling over a wire stretched across the circuit at the start/finish line an inch from the ground to activate the mechanism to record a lap time on a paper card before switching to using an electric eye in 1946. Since 1990, lap times and speeds have been recorded by electronic scoring devices or timing beacon wires embedded in certain places of the track (such as the start/finish line) and are activated by wireless transponders with a unique digital identification carried inside each car. They send digital timing information to a computer system via radio, which includes speed and lap time estimated to the thousandth of a second.

All drivers have been permitted two warm-up laps since 1982, down from three between 1946 and 1981. The decision to continue or abandon the effort had to be made before the second warm-up lap was completed. A qualifying attempt begins when a team representative waves a green flag. If they wave the yellow flag, the attempt will not count, and the driver must return to the pit lane. If the team did not display a green flag, a vehicle may leave the pit lane as many times as it wanted. Prior to 1974, drivers raised one of their hands in the air to signal to officials that they wanted to start their qualifying run before the change was made to be in line with the procedure conducted at other race circuits. Teams are allowed to modify certain parts or electronics on their cars in their pit box following the completion of their qualifying run.

Since 1965, a blind draw conducted by a selected representative from each team (a driver, family member or team representative) has been held the night before qualifying to decide the qualifying order in order to reduce congestion or misunderstandings. All participants have been guaranteed at least one try to qualify in the pole position round, regardless of weather or other circumstances since 1971. Every driver does their qualifying run with no other car on the circuit and their average speed over all of their laps is used to determine their final starting place. The grid is arranged by 11 rows of three participants each for a total of 33 starting drivers.

=== 1911–2004 ===
In 1911, the starting order was determined by the date the IMS received entries, and all cars had to reach 75 mph (121 km/h) on a quarter-mile part of the main straight. This was adjusted to drivers averaging 75 mph (121 km/h) on the whole track in 1912, while the starting grid was still set by the order IMS received postal entries. A blind draw was conducted in both 1913 and 1914 once drivers reached the 75 mph (121 km/h) minimum speed. The qualifying format was revised in 1915 so that the grid was determined by drivers' one-lap speeds, with a minimum speed of 80 mph (130 km/h). From 1920 to 1932, participants set the starting order by completing four-lap (10 mi (16 km)) qualifying runs at a set minimum speed between 80 and 95 mph (129 and 153 km/h). From 1933 to 1938, it was a ten-lap (25 mi (40 km)) qualifying speed format with cars carrying 3 US gal (11 L; 2.5 imp gal) of fuel. The four-lap speed format was reinstated in 1939, and the minimum speed requirement was dropped after 1963.

The draw is conducted on a "first-come, first-served" basis, with the fastest 33 drivers starting the race regardless of when they qualified. Previously, the qualifying order was set by teams presenting their cars in a queue that began in the garage area. The quickest qualifier on the first day or the top qualifier following a single trip through the original timing line took pole position, whichever came last. All cars were given three attempts to qualify and its speed was made official after completing four-laps (10 mi (16 km)) and cannot re-qualify. The driver could requalify in another vehicle if it did not qualify or withdrew. After 33 cars qualified, the slowest qualifier, regardless of position in the provisional starting order, could be demoted by a faster car. All successful qualifiers were assured participation in the race based on their qualifying time and speed. The first day's quickest qualifier took the pole position, while the first day qualifiers were followed by those from the previous two or three days through their set qualifying speed, respectively.

In 1996 and 1997, the top 25 cars in the Indy Racing League (IRL) points standings were guaranteed a starting position in the race with the final eight spots open for all other entries.

=== 2005–2009 ===
In order to boost interest, increase action, and attract more spectators, IMS officials changed the qualifying format to a four-session format known as "11-11-11" in 2005. On the first three days, 11 cars qualified, and bumping occurred on each day once position 11 was taken and within the allocated positions. Positions 11 to pole position were taken on the first day, positions 12 to 22 on the second, and positions 23 to 33 on the third. If the third day completed the starting order, the fourth and final day (Bump Day) permitted a participant that lapped faster than one that qualified in the previous three days to demote the slowest entrant from the starting order. It would take 33rd place or better if the driver went faster than any other Bump Day qualifier. Bumping would be widespread throughout the starting order under this format, rather than being restricted to the slowest vehicles. If the 11 starting slots on one day were not filled, they would be considered for the next day. Rain could not end a session early if all 33 spots were filled. If the field was not complete, the IRL and IMS decided the time teams would have for the next available day.

All cars, backup or primary, were given three attempts each day or twelve over all four days to qualify for the race. Any driver who set the same qualifying time and speed as a participant on the first day would be placed based on where they qualified on that day. If the time and speed are the slowest overall, the participant who set the time and speed on the second day will be the first to fail to qualify. If a vehicle failed to qualify on any qualifying day, it was allowed to return to the qualifying line and attempt to re-qualify based on how many attempts it had left. Entrants could still withdraw a qualified car if necessary, although it could still attempt to qualify based on the number of tries it had left for that day. Unlike previous formats, no car had to be withdrawn from the race. If a car was withdrawn from the event, the rest of the field would gain one position. This system, according to IMS historian Donald Davidson and author Rick Shaffer, offered the best drivers more chances to claim the pole position.

=== 2010–2013 ===
In 2010, a new "made-for-TV" two-day shootout format based loosely on the IndyCar Series' road and street course qualifying procedure was implemented. The format gradually decreased the field to determine the pole position starter. The first six-hour qualifying day filled the top 24 spots. All cars had three tries to set a qualifying speed, and positions 10 through 24 were set after the session. The quickest nine entrants' lap times and speeds were erased, and they all advanced to the 90-minute Fast Nine Shootout session, which determined pole position through ninth. They started from the fastest to the slowest, and each driver had to finish at least one more run with the option of another if time allowed.

If the Fast Nine Shootout was cancelled due to inclement weather, the starting order would be set by each driver's lap times from the previous session. The following day's session determined places 24 to 33, and bumping commenced when 33 cars qualified. Any qualifying speed quicker than a previously qualified car would mean that car was demoted from the starting grid, regardless of the day it qualified, and any car other than those that qualified for the Fast Nine Shootout risked not qualifying. The demoted entrant was withdrawn from the field but granted three attempts to return to the grid, time permitting, and the car that demoted it was put at the back of the starting grid. There would only be one day of qualifying if rain disrupted the first day. All 33 starting positions would be set and the Fast Nine Shootout would not happen.

In contrast to previous IndyCar Series races, where only the polesitter received one point, all 33 qualifying drivers earned championship points. The pole winner earned 15 points, with second and third receiving 13 and 12, respectively. Those who qualified on the second and third rows scored between 11 and 6 points in descending order. Each driver in positions 10 to 24 gained four points, while drivers in positions 25 to 33 got three points. Following the first and fastest four-lap average speed recorded during the Fast Nine Shootout by driver Hélio Castroneves, which was therefore unbeatable, the rules were changed such that all nine entrants of the session would run in reverse order from slowest to quickest.

=== 2014–2018 ===
In 2014, a two-day format was established. IndyCar officials planned three sessions over two days to increase broadcast viewership, track attendance, and entertainment. On the first day, the top 33 entries completed the provisional starting grid, and each car had at least one qualifying attempt. The fastest nine entrants qualified for the following day's Fast Nine Shootout. If more than 33 vehicles were entered, a driver who was not among the top 33 qualifiers did not advance to the second day's session.

The pit lane was divided into two distinct lanes. The first was called the "Priority Lane" for non-qualified vehicles or ones that had their previous qualifying lap times withdrawn, while the second was for already qualified drivers who desired another attempt. The withdrawal of the time was unnecessary. All of the previous day's laps were erased the next day, and those in positions 10 to 33 had to make another attempt to set the starting order. To set the top nine positions, the Fast Nine Shootout's nine qualifiers went out in reverse order from the previous day's slowest to fastest speeds.

Every qualifier on the first day received points, with the fastest driver getting 33 points and the slowest contender receiving one point. The pole sitting earned nine points, while the driver in ninth received one point. In 2016, this was changed to qualifying's second day, with the pole sitter collecting 42 points down to the 33rd-placed qualifier earning one point. The qualifying points format was significantly revised in 2018, with the pole sitter receiving nine points, down to one point for the ninth-placed qualifier.

=== 2019–present ===
Following debate when driver James Hinchcliffe failed to qualify in 2018, a modified version of the two-day format intended to be more exciting was used from 2019. Every driver had one qualifying run to claim a top 30 starting position on the first day, but more attempts could be made time and weather permitting until the track was closed. Positions 10 to 30 were claimed and did not re-qualify the following day. The second day included a one-hour Last Row Shootout for the slowest three qualifiers, as well as the Fast Nine Shootout. Each car in both sessions received one try, and their prior day's times were erased. The Last Row Shootout's order to set places 31 to 33 and demote any one from the starting order was based on the previous day's results, and the Fast Nine Shootout to set pole position through ninth ran in reverse order from the slowest to the quickest car from the previous day. The Last Row Shootout was extended to 75 minutes in 2020 to give each competitor three qualifying chances.

IndyCar modified the format again in 2022 to more closely resemble its qualifying procedure on road and street circuits. Following the first day of qualifying to determine positions 13 to 30 through drivers' speeds, there would be two sessions to set the first four rows, including the pole position. The 60-minute Last Chance Qualifying session would occur if there were more than 33 entries and all were guaranteed of one or multiple tries until the session ended to decide positions 31 to 33 and the car that does not qualify for the race. Those in 13th to 33rd had their starting positions guaranteed if just 33 cars were entered. If a driver makes multiple tries, all of their other times are deleted, and the top non-qualified entry takes 33rd place. Participants got an extra cool-down lap after each attempt to reduce the effect of heat soak and to make further tries until there were 10 minutes left. The top 12 qualifiers compete in the second round of qualifying, with the fastest six advancing to the ensuing Fast Six Shootout to determine pole position to sixth place based on their final performance. The top six slowest qualifiers start from places seven through twelve according to their set time. Each driver receives one attempt in each session, which are run in reverse order from slowest to fastest.

Beginning in 2023, the format's schedule was adjusted. The Top 12 Qualifying session now occurs before the Last Chance Qualifying session. Points are currently granted to the first 12 qualifiers, with the pole position starter earning 12 points and the driver starting in 12th place earning one.

== By year ==
Key
| (R) | Indicates polesitter was an Indianapolis 500 rookie |
| * | Indicates driver got the pole position as the first race entry |
| † | Indicates driver drew the pole position |
| ‡ | Indicates polesitter was not the fastest overall qualifier |
| Unk | Indicates unknown tire supplier |

Tire manufacturers
Key
| Icon | Maker |
|---|---|
| D | Dunlop |
| F | Firestone |
| G | Goodyear |

Polesitters of the Indianapolis 500 by year
| Year | Date | Driver | No. | Team | Make | Tire | Speed | | | Finish | Ref |
| Year | Date | Driver | No. | Team | Make | Tire | Time | MPH | KPH | Finish | Ref |
|---|---|---|---|---|---|---|---|---|---|---|---|
| 1911 | May 26 | Lewis Strang (USA)* | 1 | Case Corporation | Case-Wisconsin | Unk | Passed 5/26 | | | 29 | |
| 1912 | May 27 | Gil Andersen (USA)*‡ | 1 | Ideal Motor Car Company | Stutz-Wisconsin | Unk | 1:51.20 | 80.93 (Note: David Bruce-Brown was the fastest overall qualifier with a speed of 88.45 mph (142.35 km/h).) | 130.24 | 16 | |
| 1913 | May 27 | Caleb Bragg (USA)†‡ | 19 | Mercer Automobile Company | Mercer | Unk | 1:42.86 | 87.34 (Note: Jack Tower was the fastest overall qualifier with a speed of 88.23 mph (141.99 km/h).) | 140.56 | 15 | |
| 1914 | May 26 | Jean Chassagne (FRA) (R)†‡ | 12 | Sunbeam Motor Car Company | Sunbeam | Unk | 1:41.91 | 88.31 (Note: Georges Boillot was the fastest overall qualifier with a speed of 99.86 mph (160.71 km/h).) | 142.12 | 29 | |
| 1915 | May 23 | Howdy Wilcox (USA) | 1 | Stutz Motor Car Company | Stutz | Unk | 1:31.00 | 98.80 | 159.00 | 7 | |
| 1916 | May 26 | Johnny Aitken (USA) | 18 | Indianapolis Speedway Team Company | Peugeot EX3 | Unk | 1:33.83 | 95.90 | 155.61 | 15 | |
| 1917–1918 | Not held as a result of World War I | | | | | | | | | | |
| 1919 | May 27 | René Thomas (FRA) | 31 | Ernest Ballot | Ballot | Unk | 1:25.89 | 104.78 | 168.63 | 11 | |
| 1920 | May 26 | Ralph DePalma (USA) | 2 | Ralph DePalma | Ballot | Unk | 1:30.08 | 99.15 | 159.57 | 5 | |
| 1921 | May 25 | Ralph DePalma (USA) | 4 | Ralph DePalma | Ballot | Unk | 1:29.11 | 100.75 | 162.14 | 12 | |
| 1922 | May 25 | Jimmy Murphy (USA) | 35 | Jimmy Murphy | Duesenberg-Miller | F | 5:58.24 | 100.50 | 161.74 | 1 | |
| 1923 | May 26 | Tommy Milton (USA) | 1 | H. C. S. Motor Company | Miller | F | 5:32.81 | 108.17 | 174.08 | 1 | |
| 1924 | May 26 | Jimmy Murphy (USA) | 2 | Jimmy Murphy | Miller | F | 5:33.20 | 108.037 | 173.869 | 3 | |
| 1925 | May 26 | Leon Duray (USA) | 28 | Harry Hartz | Miller | F | 5:18.03 | 113.196 | 182.171 | 6 | |
| 1926 | May 27 | Earl Cooper (USA) | 5 | Miller Automobiles | Miller | F | 5:22.19 | 111.735 | 179.820 | 16 | |
| 1927 | May 26 | Frank Lockhart (USA) | 2 | Frank S Lockhart | Miller | F | 4:59.75 | 120.100 | 193.282 | 18 | |
| 1928 | May 26 | Leon Duray (USA) | 4 | Leon Duray | Miller | F | 4:54.14 | 122.391 | 196.969 | 19 | |
| 1929 | May 25 | Cliff Woodbury (USA) | 8 | Cliff R Woodbury | Miller | Unk | 4:58.51 | 120.599 | 194.085 | 33 | |
| 1930 | May 24 | Billy Arnold (USA) | 4 | Harry Hartz | Summers-Miller | F | 5:17.83 | 113.268 | 182.287 | 1 | |
| 1931 | May 23 | Russ Snowberger (USA)‡ | 4 | Russell Snowberger | Snowberger-Studebaker | F | 5:19.16 | 112.796 (Note: Billy Arnold was the fastest qualifier but was disqualified for having his brakes disconnected. He set the fastest overall qualifying speed of 116.080 mph (186.813 km/h) and began from 18th.) | 181.528 | 5 | |
| 1932 | May 21 | Lou Moore (USA) | 8 | M. J. Boyle | Miller | F | 5:06.74 | 117.363 | 188.877 | 25 | |
| 1933 | May 20 | Bill Cummings (USA) | 5 | M. J. Boyle | Miller | F | 12:39.30 | 118.530 (Note: Contemporary sources reported that the 1933 average pole speed was 118.521 mph (190.741 km/h).) | 190.756 | 25 | |
| 1934 | May 19 | Kelly Petillo (USA) | 17 | Joe Marks | Adams-Miller | F | 12:34.22 | 119.329 | 192.041 | 11 | |
| 1935 | May 18 | Rex Mays (USA) (Note: Kelly Petillo qualified fastest with an average speed of 121.687 mph (195.836 km/h), but was disqualified for using 5/8 pint too much fuel. Mays was elevated to the pole position.) | 33 | Paul Weirick | Adams-Miller | F | 12:25.43 | 120.736 | 194.306 | 17 | |
| 1936 | May 16 | Rex Mays (USA) | 33 | Paul Weirick | Adams-Sparks | F | 12:32.23 | 119.644 | 192.548 | 15 | |
| 1937 | May 15 | Bill Cummings (USA)‡ | 16 | H. C. Henning | Miller-Offenhauser | F | 12:09.67 | 123.343 (Note: Jimmy Snyder in 19th set the fastest qualifying speed of 125.287 mph (201.630 km/h). Contemporary news reports said that the 1937 average pole speed was 123.455 mph (198.682 km/h).) | 198.501 | 6 | |
| 1938 | May 21 | Floyd Roberts (USA)‡ | 23 | Lou Moore | Wetteroth-Miller | F | 11:56.10 | 125.681 (Note: 10th-place qualifier Ronney Householder set the quickest qualifying speed of 125.769 mph (202.406 km/h). Roberts' pole speed was announced as 125.506 mph (201.982 km/h) before it was corrected to 125.681 mph (202.264 km/h).) | 202.264 | 1 | |
| 1939 | May 20 | Jimmy Snyder (USA) | 10 | Thorne Engineering | Adams-Sparks | F | 4:36.63 | 130.138 | 209.437 | 2 | |
| 1940 | May 18 | Rex Mays (USA) | 33 | Bowes Racing | Stevens-Winfield | F | 4:41.58 | 127.850 | 205.755 | 2 | |
| 1941 | May 17 | Mauri Rose (USA) | 3 | Lou Moore | Maserati 8CTF | F | 4:39.74 | 128.691 | 207.108 | 26 | |
| 1942–1945 | Not held as a result of World War II | | | | | | | | | | |
| 1946 | May 18 | Cliff Bergere (USA)‡ | 3 | Shirley Bergere | Wetteroth-Offenhauser | F | 4:44.65 | 126.471 (Note: Ralph Hepburn in 19th recorded the fastest qualifying speed of 133.944 mph (215.562 km/h).) | 203.535 | 16 | |
| 1947 | May 17 | Ted Horn (USA)‡ | 1 | H. C. Henning | Maserati 8CTF | F | 4:44.44 | 126.564 (Note: Bill Holland, who started 8th, recorded the fastest qualifying speed of 128.755 mph (207.211 km/h).) | 203.685 | 3 | |
| 1948 | May 15 | Rex Mays (USA)‡ | 5 | Bowes Racing | Kurtis-Winfield | F | 4:35.70 | 130.577 (Note: Duke Nalon set the fastest qualifying speed of 131.603 mph (211.794 km/h) and took 11th.) | 210.143 | 19 | |
| 1949 | May 14 | Duke Nalon (USA) | 54 | W. C. Winfield | Kurtis-Novi | F | 4:38.80 | 132.939 | 213.945 | 29 | |
| 1950 | May 13 | Walt Faulkner (USA) (R) | 98 | J. C. Agajanian | Kurtis KK2000-Offenhauser | F | 4:27.97 | 134.343 | 216.204 | 7 | |
| 1951 | May 12 | Duke Nalon (USA)‡ | 54 | Jean Marcenac | Kurtis-Novi | F | 4:23.75 | 136.498 (Note: The fastest overall qualifier was Walt Faulkner in 14th who recorded a speed of 136.872 mph (220.274 km/h).) | 219.672 | 10 | |
| 1952 | May 17 | Fred Agabashian (USA)‡ | 28 | Cummins Engine Co | Kurtis-Cummins | F | 4:20.85 | 138.010 (Note: The fastest qualifier was Chet Miller who set a speed of 139.034 mph (223.754 km/h) for 27th.) | 222.106 | 27 | |
| 1953 | May 17 | Bill Vukovich (USA) | 14 | Howard B. Keck | Kurtis KK500A-Offenhauser | F | 4:20.13 | 138.392 | 222.720 | 1 | |
| 1954 | May 15 | Jack McGrath (USA) | 2 | Jack B. Hinkle | Kurtis KK500C-Offenhauser | F | 4:15.26 | 141.033 | 226.791 | 3 | |
| 1955 | May 14 | Jerry Hoyt (USA)‡ | 23 | Jim Robbins | Stevens-Offenhauser | F | 4:17.06 | 140.045 (Note: The fastest qualifier was Jack McGrath who set a speed of 142.580 mph (229.460 km/h) for 3rd place.) | 225.381 | 31 | |
| 1956 | May 19 | Pat Flaherty (USA) | 8 | John Zink | Watson-Offenhauser | F | 4:07.26 | 145.596 | 234.314 | 1 | |
| 1957 | May 18 | Pat O'Connor (USA)‡ | 12 | Chapman S. Root | Kurtis KK500G-Offenhauser | F | 4:10.09 | 143.948 (Note: Paul Russo in 10th went fastest overall in qualifying with a speed of 144.817 mph (233.060 km/h).) | 231.662 | 8 | |
| 1958 | May 17 | Dick Rathmann (USA) | 97 | Lee Elkins | Watson-Offenhauser | F | 4:06.62 | 145.974 | 234.922 | 27 | |
| 1959 | May 16 | Johnny Thomson (USA) | 3 | Racing Associates | Lesovsky-Offenhauser | F | 4:06.73 | 145.908 | 234.816 | 3 | |
| 1960 | May 14 | Eddie Sachs (USA)‡ | 6 | Dean Van Lines Racing | Ewing-Offenhauser | F | 4:05.58 | 146.592 (Note: Jim Hurtubise took 20th and went quickest overall in qualifying with a speed of 149.056 mph (239.882 km/h).) | 235.917 | 21 | |
| 1961 | May 13 | Eddie Sachs (USA) | 12 | Dean Van Lines Racing | Ewing-Offenhauser | F | 4:04.10 | 147.481 | 237.348 | 2 | |
| 1962 | May 12 | Parnelli Jones (USA) | 98 | J. C. Agajanian | Watson-Offenhauser | F | 3:59.41 | 150.370 | 241.997 | 7 | |
| 1963 | May 18 | Parnelli Jones (USA) | 98 | J. C. Agajanian | Watson-Offenhauser | F | 3:58.17 | 151.153 | 243.257 | 1 | |
| 1964 | May 16 | Jim Clark (GBR) | 6 | Team Lotus | Lotus 34-Ford | D | 3:46.66 | 158.828 | 255.609 | 24 | |
| 1965 | May 15 | A. J. Foyt (USA) | 1 | Ansted-Thompson Racing | Lotus 34-Ford | G | 3:43.28 | 161.233 | 259.479 | 15 | |
| 1966 | May 14 | Mario Andretti (USA) | 1 | Dean Van Lines Racing | Brawner Hawk Mk I-Ford | F | 3:37.00 | 165.899 | 266.989 | 18 | |
| 1967 | May 13 | Mario Andretti (USA) | 1 | Dean Van Lines Racing | Brawner Hawk Mk II-Ford | F | 3:33.04 | 168.982 | 271.950 | 30 | |
| 1968 | May 18 | Joe Leonard (USA) | 60 | Vel's Parnelli Jones Racing | Lotus 56-Pratt & Whitney | F | 3:29.84 | 171.559 | 276.097 | 12 | |
| 1969 | May 24 | A. J. Foyt (USA) | 6 | Ansted-Thompson Racing | Coyote-Ford | G | 3:31.06 | 170.568 | 274.503 | 8 | |
| 1970 | May 16 | Al Unser (USA) | 2 | Vel's Parnelli Jones Racing | Colt 70-Ford | F | 3:31.49 | 170.221 | 273.944 | 1 | |
| 1971 | May 15 | Peter Revson (USA) | 86 | Team McLaren | McLaren M16-Offenhauser | G | 3:21.46 | 178.696 | 287.583 | 2 | |
| 1972 | May 14 | Bobby Unser (USA) | 6 | All American Racers | Eagle 72-Offenhauser | G | 3:03.73 | 195.940 | 315.335 | 30 | |
| 1973 | May 12 | Johnny Rutherford (USA) | 7 | Team McLaren | McLaren M16C-Offenhauser | G | 3:01.44 | 198.413 | 319.315 | 9 | |
| 1974 | May 11 | A. J. Foyt (USA) | 14 | Gilmore Racing Team | Coyote-Ford | G | 3:07.86 | 191.632 | 308.402 | 15 | |
| 1975 | May 10 | A. J. Foyt (USA) | 14 | Gilmore Racing Team | Coyote-Ford | G | 3:05.59 | 193.976 | 312.174 | 3 | |
| 1976 | May 15 | Johnny Rutherford (USA)‡ | 2 | Bruce McLaren Motor Racing | McLaren M16E-Offenhauser | G | 3:10.52 | 188.957 (Note: The fastest overall qualifier was Mario Andretti with a speed of 189.404 mph (304.816 km/h) for 19th.) | 304.097 | 1 | |
| 1977 | May 14 | Tom Sneva (USA) | 8 | Penske Racing | McLaren M24-Cosworth | G | 3:01.01 | 198.884 | 320.073 | 2 | |
| 1978 | May 20 | Tom Sneva (USA) | 1 | Penske Racing | Penske PC-6-Cosworth | G | 2:58.08 | 202.156 | 325.339 | 2 | |
| 1979 | May 13 | Rick Mears (USA) | 1 | Penske Racing | Penske PC-6-Cosworth | G | 3:05.82 | 193.736 | 311.788 | 1 | |
| 1980 | May 10 | Johnny Rutherford (USA) | 4 | Chaparral Racing | Chaparral 2K-Cosworth | G | 3:07.25 | 192.256 | 309.406 | 1 | |
| 1981 | May 16 | Bobby Unser (USA)‡ | 3 | Penske Racing | Penske PC9B-Cosworth | G | 2:59.51 | 200.546 (Note: The fastest overall qualifier was Tom Sneva with a speed of 200.691 mph (322.981 km/h) that put him 20th.) | 322.748 | 1 | |
| 1982 | May 15 | Rick Mears (USA) | 1 | Penske Racing | Penske PC10B-Cosworth | G | 2:53.91 | 207.004 | 333.141 | 2 | |
| 1983 | May 21 | Teo Fabi (ITA) (R) | 33 | Forsythe Racing | March 83C-Cosworth | G | 2:53.582 | 207.395 | 333.770 | 26 | |
| 1984 | May 12 | Tom Sneva (USA) | 1 | Mayer Motor Racing | March 84C-Cosworth | G | 2:51.405 | 210.029 | 338.009 | 16 | |
| 1985 | May 11 | Pancho Carter (USA) | 6 | Galles Racing | March 85C-Buick | G | 2:49.346 | 212.583 | 342.119 | 33 | |
| 1986 | May 10 | Rick Mears (USA) | 4 | Penske Racing | March 86C-Cosworth | G | 2:46.030 | 216.828 | 348.951 | 3 | |
| 1987 | May 9 | Mario Andretti (USA) | 5 | Newman/Haas Racing | Lola T87/00-Chevrolet | G | 2:47.135 | 215.390 | 346.637 | 9 | |
| 1988 | May 14 | Rick Mears (USA) | 5 | Penske Racing | Penske PC-17-Chevrolet | G | 2:44.235 | 219.198 | 352.765 | 1 | |
| 1989 | May 14 | Rick Mears (USA) | 4 | Penske Racing | Penske PC-18-Chevrolet | G | 2:40.797 | 223.885 | 360.308 | 23 | |
| 1990 | May 13 | Emerson Fittipaldi (BRA) | 1 | Penske Racing | Penske PC-19-Chevrolet | G | 2:39.786 | 225.301 | 362.587 | 3 | |
| 1991 | May 11 | Rick Mears (USA)‡ | 3 | Penske Racing | Penske PC-20-Chevrolet | G | 2:40.633 | 224.113 (Note: The fastest overall qualifier was Gary Bettenhausen with a speed of 224.468 mph (361.246 km/h) that put him 13th.) | 360.675 | 1 | |
| 1992 | May 9 | Roberto Guerrero (COL) | 36 | King Racing | Lola T92/00-Buick | G | 2:34.851 | 232.482 | 374.144 | 33 | |
| 1993 | May 15 | Arie Luyendyk (NLD) | 10 | Chip Ganassi Racing | Lola T93/00-Ford | G | 2:40.738 | 223.967 | 360.440 | 2 | |
| 1994 | May 14 | Al Unser Jr. (USA) | 31 | Penske Racing | Penske PC-23-Mercedes-Benz | G | 2:37.887 | 228.011 | 366.948 | 1 | |
| 1995 | May 13 | Scott Brayton (USA) | 60 | Team Menard | Lola T95/00-Buick/Menard | G | 2:35.438 | 231.604 | 372.731 | 17 | |
| 1996 | May 11 | Tony Stewart (USA) (Note: Scott Brayton was the fastest in qualifying, but his car was taken over by Danny Ongais after he died in a practice accident. Arie Luyendyk was disqualified from second place as his car was 7 lb (3.2 kg) underweight. All this promoted Stewart to the pole position.) (R)‡ | 20 | Team Menard | Lola T95/00-Buick/Menard | F | 2:34.440 | 233.100 (Note: Arie Luyendyk set the one-lap IMS record of 237.498 mph (382.216 km/h) and the four-lap track record of 236.986 mph (381.392 km/h) in the second day of qualifying and qualified 20th.) | 375.138 | 24 | |
| 1997 | May 10 | Arie Luyendyk (NLD) | 5 | Treadway Racing | G-Force GF01-Oldsmobile Aurora | F | 2:44.939 | 218.263 | 351.260 | 1 | |
| 1998 | May 16 | Billy Boat (USA) | 11 | A. J. Foyt Racing | Dallara IR-7-Oldsmobile Aurora | G | 2:40.072 | 223.503 | 359.693 | 23 | |
| 1999 | May 22 | Arie Luyendyk (NLD) | 5 | Treadway Racing | G-Force GF01-Oldsmobile Aurora | F | 2:39.873 | 225.179 | 362.390 | 22 | |
| 2000 | May 20 | Greg Ray (USA) | 1 | Team Menard | Dallara IR-00-Oldsmobile Aurora | F | 2:41.095 | 223.471 | 359.672 | 33 | |
| 2001 | May 12 | Scott Sharp (USA) | 8 | Kelley Racing | Dallara IR-01-Oldsmobile Aurora | F | 2:39.2658 | 226.037 | 363.771 | 33 | |
| 2002 | May 11 | Bruno Junqueira (BRA) | 33 | Chip Ganassi Racing | G-Force GF05-Chevrolet | F | 2:35.6136 | 231.342 | 372.309 | 31 | |
| 2003 | May 11 | Hélio Castroneves (BRA) | 3 | Team Penske | Dallara IR-03-Toyota | F | 2:35.3564 | 231.725 | 372.925 | 2 | |
| 2004 | May 15 | Buddy Rice (USA) | 15 | Rahal Letterman Racing | Panoz G-Force GF09-Honda | F | 2:42.1445 | 222.024 | 357.313 | 1 | |
| 2005 | May 15 | Tony Kanaan (BRA)‡ | 11 | Andretti Green Racing | Dallara IR-03-Honda | F | 2:38.1961 | 227.566 (Note: Kenny Bräck recorded the fastest overall speed of 227.598 mph (366.283 km/h) in qualifying to start from 23rd place.) | 366.232 | 8 | |
| 2006 | May 20 | Sam Hornish Jr. (USA) | 6 | Team Penske | Dallara IR-03-Honda | F | 2:37.2155 | 228.985 | 368.516 | 1 | |
| 2007 | May 12 | Hélio Castroneves (BRA) | 3 | Team Penske | Dallara IR-05-Honda | F | 2:39.4214 | 225.817 | 363.417 | 3 | |
| 2008 | May 10 | Scott Dixon (NZL) | 9 | Chip Ganassi Racing | Dallara IR-05-Honda | F | 2:39.0348 | 226.366 | 364.301 | 1 | |
| 2009 | May 9 | Hélio Castroneves (BRA) | 3 | Team Penske | Dallara IR-05-Honda | F | 2:40.0967 | 224.864 | 361.880 | 1 | |
| 2010 | May 22 | Hélio Castroneves (BRA) | 3 | Team Penske | Dallara IR-05-Honda | F | 2:37.9154 | 227.970 | 367.809 | 9 | |
| 2011 | May 21 | Alex Tagliani (CAN) | 77 | Sam Schmidt Motorsports | Dallara IR-05-Honda | F | 2:38.2613 | 227.472 | 366.081 | 28 | |
| 2012 | May 19 | Ryan Briscoe (AUS) | 2 | Team Penske | Dallara DW12-Chevrolet | F | 2:38.9514 | 226.484 | 364.491 | 5 | |
| 2013 | May 18 | Ed Carpenter (USA)‡ | 20 | Ed Carpenter Racing | Dallara DW12-Chevrolet | F | 2:37.3689 | 228.762 (Note: Will Power had the fastest qualifying speed of 228.844 mph (368.289 km/h).) | 368.156 | 10 | |
| 2014 | May 18 | Ed Carpenter (USA) | 20 | Ed Carpenter Racing | Dallara DW12-Chevrolet | F | 2:35.7992 | 231.067 | 371.866 | 27 | |
| 2015 | May 17 | Scott Dixon (NZL) | 9 | Chip Ganassi Racing | Dallara DW12-Chevrolet | F | 2:38.7579 | 226.760 (Note: Ryan Hunter-Reay had the fastest overall qualifying speed of 229.845 mph (369.900 km/h) but it was voided because of inclement weather on the first day of qualifying.) | 364.935 | 4 | |
| 2016 | May 22 | James Hinchcliffe (CAN) | 5 | Schmidt Peterson Motorsports | Dallara DW12-Honda | F | 2:36.0063 | 230.760 (Note: The fastest overall qualifying speed of 230.946 mph (371.672 km/h) was recorded by Hinchcliffe during the first day of qualifying.) | 371.371 | 7 | |
| 2017 | May 21 | Scott Dixon (NZL) | 9 | Chip Ganassi Racing | Dallara DW12-Honda | F | 2:35.0630 | 232.164 | 373.632 | 32 | |
| 2018 | May 20 | Ed Carpenter (USA) | 20 | Ed Carpenter Racing | Dallara DW12-Chevrolet | F | 2:36.7818 | 229.618 | 369.534 | 2 | |
| 2019 | May 19 | Simon Pagenaud (FRA)‡ | 22 | Team Penske | Dallara DW12-Chevrolet | F | 2:36.5271 | 229.992 (Note: Spencer Pigot recorded the fastest qualifying speed of 230.083 mph (370.283 km/h) in the first day of qualifying.) | 370.136 | 1 | |
| 2020 | August 16 | Marco Andretti (USA) | 98 | Andretti Herta Autosport w/ Marco Andretti & Curb-Agajanian | Dallara DW12-Honda | F | 2:35.7985 | 231.068 (Note: Marco Andretti posted the fastest qualifying attempt of 231.351 mph (372.323 km/h) on qualifying's first day.) | 371.868 | 13 | |
| 2021 | May 23 | Scott Dixon (NZL) | 9 | Chip Ganassi Racing | Dallara DW12-Honda | F | 2:35.3837 | 231.685 (Note: Scott Dixon recorded the fastest overall speed of 231.828 mph (373.091 km/h) during the first day of qualifying.) | 372.861 | 17 | |
| 2022 | May 22 | Scott Dixon (NZL) | 9 | Chip Ganassi Racing | Dallara DW12-Honda | F | 2:33.8162 | 234.046 | 376.661 | 21 | |
| 2023 | May 21 | Álex Palou (ESP) | 10 | Chip Ganassi Racing | Dallara DW12-Honda | F | 2:33.7037 | 234.217 | 376.936 | 4 | |
| 2024 | May 19 | Scott McLaughlin (NZL) | 3 | Team Penske | Dallara DW12-Chevrolet | F | 2:33.7017 | 234.220 | 376.940 | 6 | |
| 2025 | May 18 | Robert Shwartzman (ISR) (R) | 83 | Prema Racing | Dallara DW12-Chevrolet | F | 2:34.6459 | 232.790 (Note: Alex Palou recorded the fastest overall speed of 233.043 mph (375.046 km/h) during the first day of qualifying.) | 374.639 | 26 | |
| 2026 | May 17 | Álex Palou (ESP) | 10 | Chip Ganassi Racing | Dallara DW12-Honda | F | 2:35.0066 | 232.248 (Note: Felix Rosenqvist recorded the fastest overall speed of 232.599 mph (374.332 km/h) during the first qualifying session.) | 373.767 | 7 | |

== By driver ==
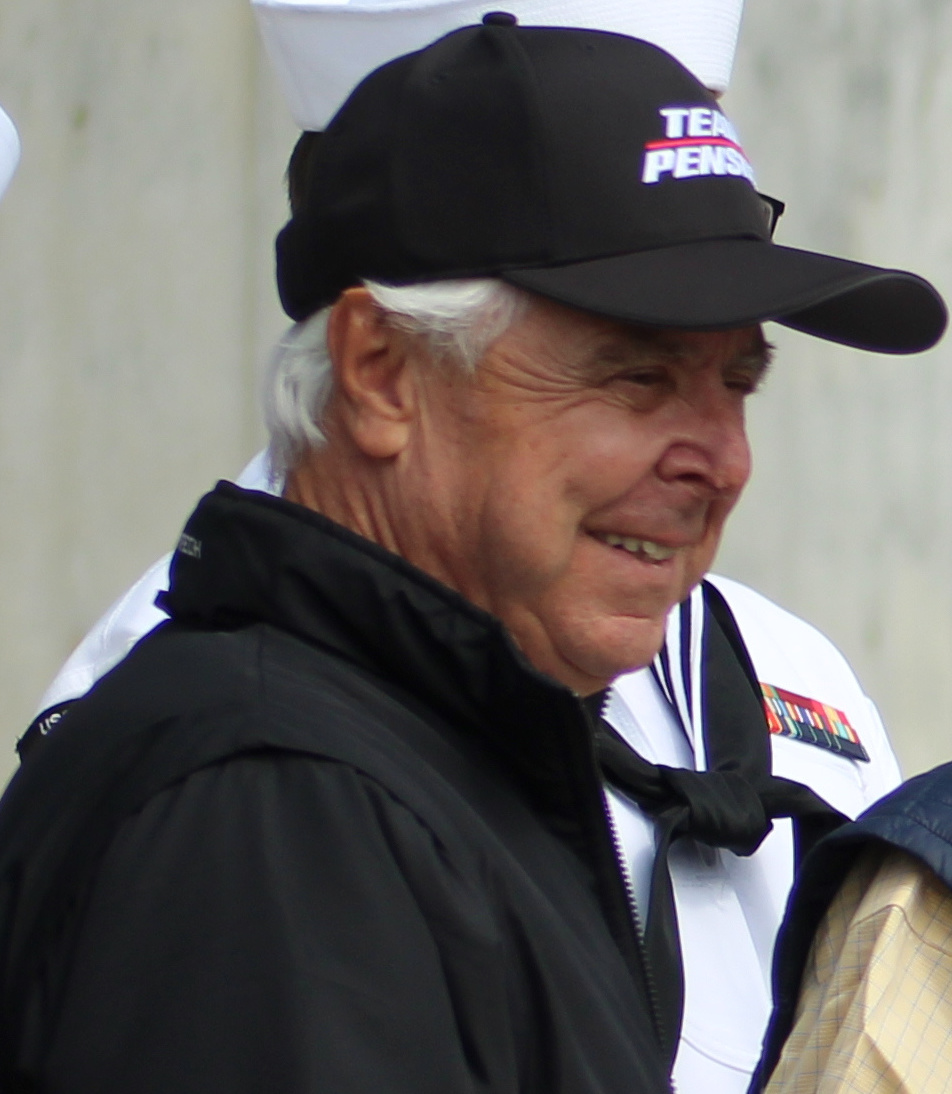
Rick Mears (pictured in 2021) holds the record for the most pole positions in the Indianapolis 500 with six.

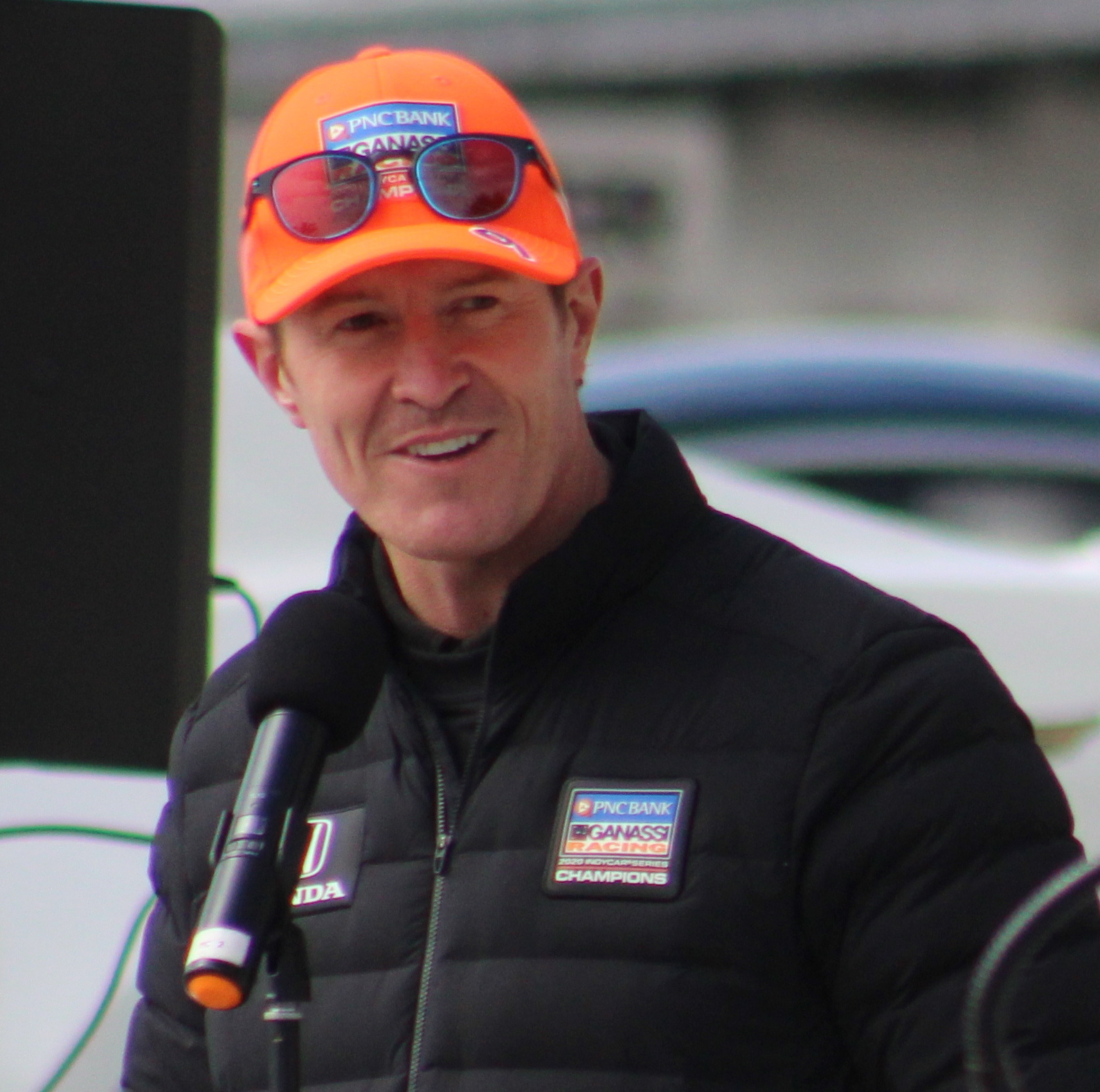
Scott Dixon (pictured in 2021) has qualified on pole position for the race on five occasions.

Multiple pole positions by driver
| Driver | Poles | Years |
|---|---|---|
| Rick Mears | 6 | 1979, 1982, 1986, 1988, 1989, 1991 |
| Scott Dixon | 5 | 2008, 2015, 2017, 2021, 2022 |
| Hélio Castroneves | 4 | 2003, 2007, 2009, 2010 |
| A. J. Foyt | 4 | 1965, 1969, 1974, 1975 |
| Rex Mays | 4 | 1935, 1936, 1940, 1948 |
| Mario Andretti | 3 | 1966, 1967, 1987 |
| Ed Carpenter | 3 | 2013, 2014, 2018 |
| Arie Luyendyk | 3 | 1993, 1997, 1999 |
| Johnny Rutherford | 3 | 1973, 1976, 1980 |
| Tom Sneva | 3 | 1977, 1978, 1984 |
| Bill Cummings | 2 | 1933, 1937 |
| Ralph DePalma | 2 | 1920, 1921 |
| Leon Duray | 2 | 1925, 1928 |
| Parnelli Jones | 2 | 1962, 1963 |
| Jimmy Murphy | 2 | 1922, 1924 |
| Duke Nalon | 2 | 1949, 1951 |
| Álex Palou | 2 | 2023, 2026 |
| Eddie Sachs | 2 | 1960, 1961 |
| Bobby Unser | 2 | 1972, 1981 |

== By driver nationality ==
List of pole positions won, by nationality of driver
| Rank | Licence | Poles | Drivers |
|---|---|---|---|
| 1 | United States | 82 | 50 |
| 2 | Brazil | 7 | 4 |
| 3 | New Zealand | 6 | 2 |
| 4 | France | 3 | 3 |
| 4 | Netherlands | 3 | 1 |
| 6 | Canada | 2 | 2 |
| 6 | Spain | 2 | 1 |
| 7 | Australia | 1 | 1 |
| 7 | Colombia | 1 | 1 |
| 7 | Israel | 1 | 1 |
| 7 | Italy | 1 | 1 |
| 7 | United Kingdom | 1 | 1 |

== By team ==
Teams by number of Indianapolis 500 pole positions
| Teams | Poles | Year(s) |
|---|---|---|
| Team Penske | 19 | 1977–1979, 1981–1982, 1986, 1988–1991, 1994, 2003, 2006–2007, 2009–2010, 2012, 2019, 2024 |
| Chip Ganassi Racing | 9 | 1993, 2002, 2008, 2015, 2017, 2021–2023, 2026 |
| Dean Van Lines Racing | 4 | 1960–1961, 1966–1967 |
| A. J. Foyt Racing | 3 | 1974–1975, 1998 |
| Ed Carpenter Racing | 3 | 2013–2014, 2018 |
| J. C. Agajanian | 3 | 1950–1962–1963 |
| Team McLaren | 3 | 1971, 1973, 1976 |
| Team Menard | 3 | 1995, 1996, 2000 |
| Andretti Autosport | 2 | 2005, 2020 |
| Ansted-Thompson Racing | 2 | 1965, 1969 |
| Bowes Racing | 2 | 1940, 1948 |
| H. C. Henning | 2 | 1937, 1947 |
| Harry Hartz | 2 | 1925, 1930 |
| Jimmy Murphy | 2 | 1922, 1924 |
| Lou Moore | 2 | 1938, 1941 |
| M. J. Boyle | 2 | 1932, 1933 |
| Paul Weirick | 2 | 1935, 1936 |
| Ralph DePalma | 2 | 1920, 1921 |
| Schmidt Peterson Motorsports | 2 | 2011, 2016 |
| Treadway Racing | 2 | 1997, 1999 |
| Vel's Parnelli Jones Racing | 2 | 1968, 1970 |
| All American Racers | 1 | 1972 |
| Case Corporation | 1 | 1911 |
| Chaparral Racing | 1 | 1980 |
| Chapman S. Root | 1 | 1957 |
| Cliff R Woodbury | 1 | 1929 |
| Cummins Engine Co | 1 | 1952 |
| Ernest Ballot | 1 | 1919 |
| Forsythe Racing | 1 | 1983 |
| Frank S Lockhart | 1 | 1927 |
| Galles Racing | 1 | 1985 |
| H. C. S. Motor Company | 1 | 1923 |
| Howard B. Keck | 1 | 1953 |
| Ideal Motor Car Company | 1 | 1912 |
| Indianapolis Speedway Team Company | 1 | 1916 |
| Jack B. Hinkle | 1 | 1954 |
| Jean Marcenac | 1 | 1951 |
| Jim Robbins | 1 | 1955 |
| Joe Marks | 1 | 1934 |
| John Zink | 1 | 1956 |
| Kelley Racing | 1 | 2001 |
| King Racing | 1 | 1992 |
| Lee Elkins | 1 | 1958 |
| Leon Duray | 1 | 1928 |
| Mayer Motor Racing | 1 | 1984 |
| Miller Autosports | 1 | 1926 |
| Newman/Haas Racing | 1 | 1987 |
| Prema Racing | 1 | 2025 |
| Racing Associates | 1 | 1959 |
| Rahal Letterman Racing | 1 | 2004 |
| Russell Snowberger | 1 | 1931 |
| Shirley Bergere | 1 | 1946 |
| Stutz Motor Car Company | 1 | 1915 |
| Sunbeam Motor Car Company | 1 | 1914 |
| Team Lotus | 1 | 1964 |
| Thorne Engineering | 1 | 1939 |
| W. C. Winfield | 1 | 1949 |

== By car make ==
Car makes by Indianapolis 500 pole positions
| Make | Poles | Year(s) |
|---|---|---|
| Dallara | 26 | 1998, 2000–2001, 2003, 2005–2026 |
| Miller | 10 | 1923–1929, 1932–1933, 1937 |
| Penske | 9 | 1978–1979, 1981–1982, 1988–1991, 1994 |
| Kurtis Kraft | 8 | 1948–1954, 1957 |
| Lola | 5 | 1987, 1992–1993, 1995, 1996 |
| Adams | 4 | 1934–1936, 1939 |
| A. J. Watson | 4 | 1956, 1958, 1962–1963 |
| Panoz | 4 | 1997, 1999, 2002, 2004 |
| March | 4 | 1983–1986 |
| McLaren | 4 | 1971, 1973, 1976–1977 |
| Ballot | 3 | 1919–1921 |
| Coyote | 3 | 1969, 1974–1975 |
| Lotus | 3 | 1964–1965, 1968 |
| Brawner Hawk | 2 | 1966–1967 |
| Ewing | 2 | 1960–1961 |
| Maserati | 2 | 1941, 1947 |
| Stevens | 2 | 1940, 1955 |
| Stutz | 2 | 1912, 1915 |
| Wetteroth | 2 | 1938, 1946 |
| Case | 1 | 1911 |
| Chaparral | 1 | 1980 |
| Colt | 1 | 1970 |
| Duesenberg | 1 | 1922 |
| Eagle | 1 | 1972 |
| Lesovsky | 1 | 1959 |
| Mercer | 1 | 1913 |
| Peugeot | 1 | 1916 |
| Snowberger | 1 | 1931 |
| Summers | 1 | 1930 |
| Sunbeam | 1 | 1914 |

== By engine manufacturer ==
Engine manufacturers by number of Indianapolis 500 poles
| Manufacturers | Poles | Year(s) |
|---|---|---|
| Offenhauser | 18 | 1937, 1946, 1950, 1953–1963, 1971–1973, 1976 |
| Honda | 15 | 2004–2011, 2016–2017, 2020–2023, 2026 |
| Miller | 14 | 1922–1930, 1932–1935, 1938 |
| Chevrolet | 14 | 1987–1991, 2002, 2012–2015, 2018–2019, 2024–2025 |
| Cosworth | 9 | 1977–1984, 1986 |
| Ford | 9 | 1964–1967, 1969–1970, 1974–1975, 1993 |
| Oldsmobile Aurora | 5 | 1997–2001 |
| Buick | 4 | 1985, 1992, 1995–1996 |
| Ballot | 3 | 1919–1921 |
| Maserati | 2 | 1941, 1947 |
| Menard | 2 | 1995–1996 |
| Novi | 2 | 1949, 1951 |
| Sparks | 2 | 1936, 1939 |
| Wisconsin | 2 | 1911–1912 |
| Cummins | 1 | 1952 |
| Mercer | 1 | 1913 |
| Mercedes-Benz | 1 | 1994 |
| Peugeot | 1 | 1916 |
| Pratt & Whitney | 1 | 1968 |
| Studebaker | 1 | 1931 |
| Stutz | 1 | 1915 |
| Sunbeam | 1 | 1914 |
| Toyota | 1 | 2003 |
| Winfield | 1 | 1940 |

== By tire make ==
Indianapolis 500 pole positions by tire manufacturer
| Rank | Manufacturer | | Poles | Year(s) |
|---|---|---|---|---|
| 1 | F | Firestone | 71 | 1922–1928, 1930–1963, 1966–1968, 1970, 1996–1997, 1999–2026 (Note: All tires have been provided by Firestone since 2000.) |
| 2 | G | Goodyear | 28 | 1965, 1969, 1971–1995, 1998 |
| 3 | D | Dunlop | 1 | 1964 |

== Bibliography ==
- Popely, Rick; Riggs, L. Spencer (1998). Indianapolis 500 Chronicle. Lincolnwood, Illinois: Publications International. ISBN 0-7853-2798-3 – via Internet Archive.
- Davidson, Donald; Shaffer, Rick (2013). Autocourse Official History of the Indianapolis 500 (Second ed.). Malvern, Worcestershire, England: Icon Publishing. ISBN 978-1-905334-82-7 – via Internet Archive.
