= Sleep in the NBA =

Sleep is an important issue in the National Basketball Association (NBA). Traveling and packed game schedules are among aspects of the NBA calendar that affect the sleep of NBA personnel. Due to these and other factors, sleep deprivation has become a prevalent issue affecting player performance.

To help combat sleep deprivation, NBA organizations have employed scientists or doctors specializing in sleep or sleep medicine on their staffs.

== History of sleep deprivation in the NBA ==
NBA players have long cited having issues sleeping or suffering from sleep deprivation. Aspects contributing to sleep deprivation include frequent travel across multiple time zones throughout a season, as well as constant circadian rhythm disruption. The issue has been noted to affect both in-game performances and mobility, as well as player recovery and mindset. The attitudes of players and organizations around the league, in regard to sleeping have changed over time. Starting in the late 2000s, NBA teams began to pay more attention to their players' sleeping habits.

According to a 2009 report by The Atlantic, players and coaches seldom slept for more than two or three hours at a time in between back-to-back games. During travel, both players and coaches were asked to sleep on the plane, the report stated. That year, NBA journalist Howard Beck wrote:

The typical night game ends at about 10 p.m. By the time players shower, dress and speak with the news media, it is close to 11 p.m. They are usually famished, so everyone eats a late dinner. Even the most conservative players—those who do not frequent nightclubs—will not get to sleep until at least 2 a.m. If the team is traveling, players may not reach their hotel until 3 a.m. For a shoot-around or practice that starts at 10 a.m., players have to arrive as early as 9 a.m. to lift weights, receive treatment or be taped.

Kobe Bryant stated in a 2014 interview that he used to "get by on three or four hours a night", before increasing the amount to between six and eight. By 2015, teams were still dealing with packed schedules, having to sometimes play four games in five nights or six in nine, respectively. These schedules often were cited as detrimental to players' energy and sleeping. LeBron James opined that sleep is the "most important" factor in player recovery but added that an NBA player's schedule makes it difficult to attain such sleep.

I think in a couple years, [sleep deprivation] will be an issue that's talked about, like the NFL with concussions.

— Tobias Harris (in 2017–18), as per Baxter Holmes, ESPN (2019)

During the 2017–18 season, then-Charlotte Hornets head coach Steve Clifford was told by a doctor that the major headaches he was suffering were due to sleep deprivation. Clifford had routinely slept four or five hours per night before waking up and working throughout his career. Later in 2018, Jake Fischer of Sports Illustrated wrote that scientific data showing the effects of sleep deprivation on players of sports came to the forefront of team personnel's attention, leading to a greater focus on players' sleep and overall well-being that year. Also in 2018, a study by Lauren Hale of Stony Brook University showed that late-night use of Twitter had effects on players' performances during the day, with shooting accuracy, ability to rebound, and number of points scored negatively affected.

Despite greater importance placed on helping players receive better sleep, the issue of sleep deprivation persisted. Hassan Whiteside, then with the Miami Heat, stated "it's impossible" to get a good night of sleep within the NBA schedule. A 2019 ESPN report cited five NBA athletic training staff members who separately noted that players netted an average six hours of sleep per 24 hours, this figure combining nightly sleep and pregame naps. Ahead of the 2019–20 season, one NBA general manager anonymously told the outlet that the NBA community has "a large population of vampires", adding that traveling logistics compounded the issue.

The NBA officially commented on the issue, maintaining that player health and wellness was a main priority for the league and stating "significant game schedule changes, an investment in a new airline charter program, a focus on mental health and wellness, and the advancement of wearable technology. ... Sleep is an area we look at closely as part of this effort." The importance emphasized on sleeping in the late 2010s came during a time when NBA coaches also began to place higher amounts of care on other off-court aspects of a player's routine. By 2019, the NBA Coaches Association had hired specialists to offer guidance to players on forming healthy habits, encompassing sleep, mental health, diet and exercise.

== Sleep science in the NBA ==
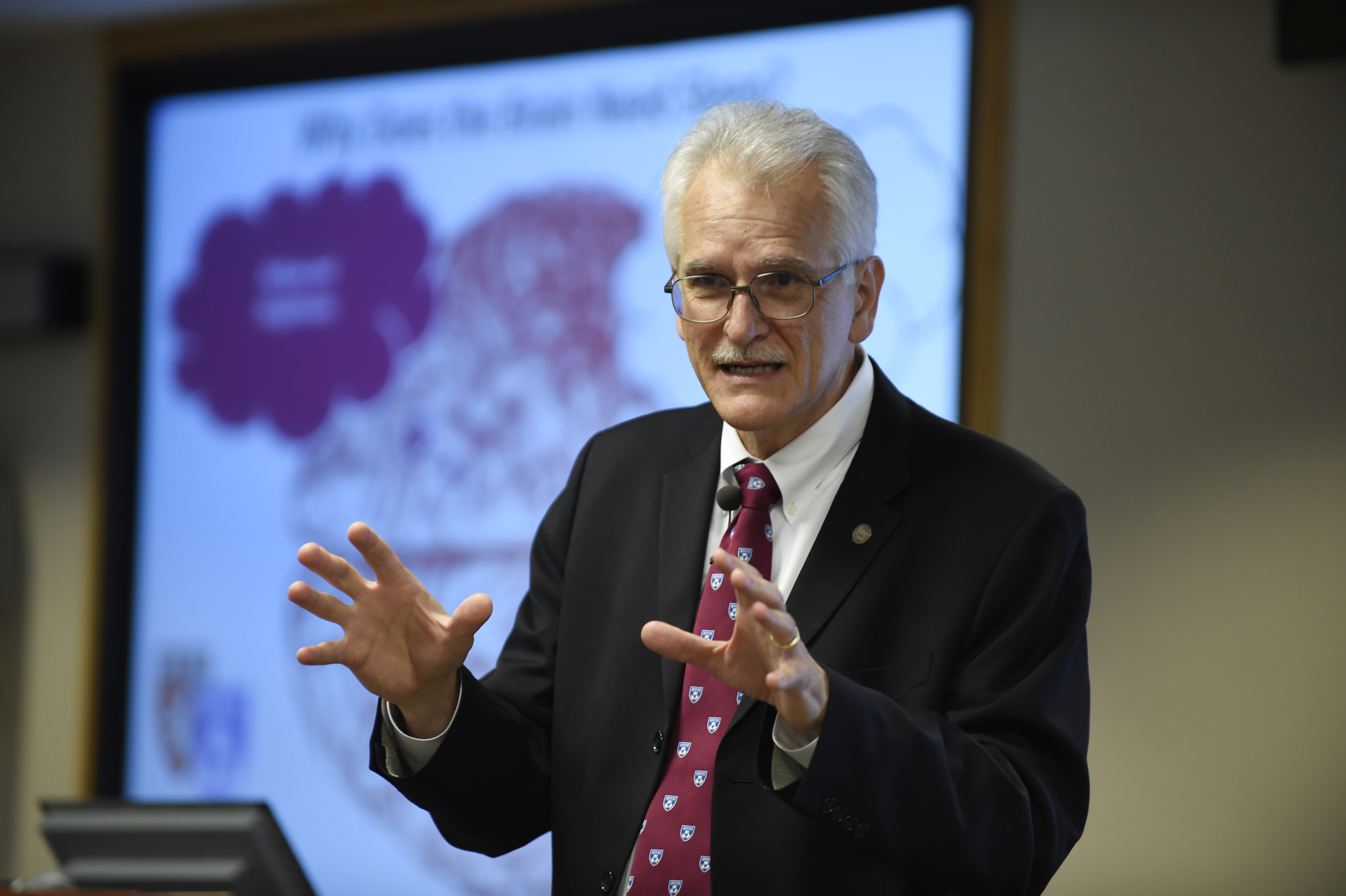
Having begun advising teams on sleep science in 2009, Charles Czeisler garnered the nickname "Sleep Doctor" in NBA circles.

In 2009, an increasing interest in sleep science and the understanding that recovery time for players was important inspired then-Boston Celtics head coach Doc Rivers to eliminate the morning shoot-around from his players' game-day routine. The San Antonio Spurs and Portland Trail Blazers also dropped the routine, while the New York Knicks only practiced it during road games. 2009 also marked when Charles Czeisler, the director of the Division of Sleep Medicine at Harvard Medical School, began working with the Blazers. Czeisler became known as the "Sleep Doctor" in NBA circles.

During the 2009–10 season, the Spurs invited a sleep specialist from Stanford University to teach them how to optimize players' rest. As part of a trial run, the team decided to shift their practice schedule from mornings to afternoons, with the expectation that players would have more time to sleep in the morning. The aim was to provide players with a continuous sleep time of 8 to 10 hours. After the trial, the Spurs reverted to morning practices. The Spurs organization would, however, continue efforts to help players with their sleeping habits; each season, the team provides wristbands to its players that track their sleeping habits and send them their personal sleep data.

Cheri Mah was also noted by media outlets to assist NBA players with their sleeping. A physician scientist at the University of California, Mah has assisted Stephen Curry with his sleeping habits.

In the 2016–17 season, the Orlando Magic staff began using mobile polysomnographs and wearable devices to measure players' sleep across the season. By the end of the season, they noticed players were obtaining minimal or no restorative REM sleep.

By 2019, many teams had begun hiring so-called sleep coaches to their staffs. Then–Celtics coach Brad Stevens noted that the team speaks "with each player on their roster about maximizing their sleep and planning their routines." Teams also began using technology to help players focus on their sleep, such as a sleep tracking device placed underneath the mattress. However, Chip Schafer, the Chicago Bulls' director of performance health, noted that players' compliance was an issue with the technology.

=== Effect on player habits ===
NBA players in 2022

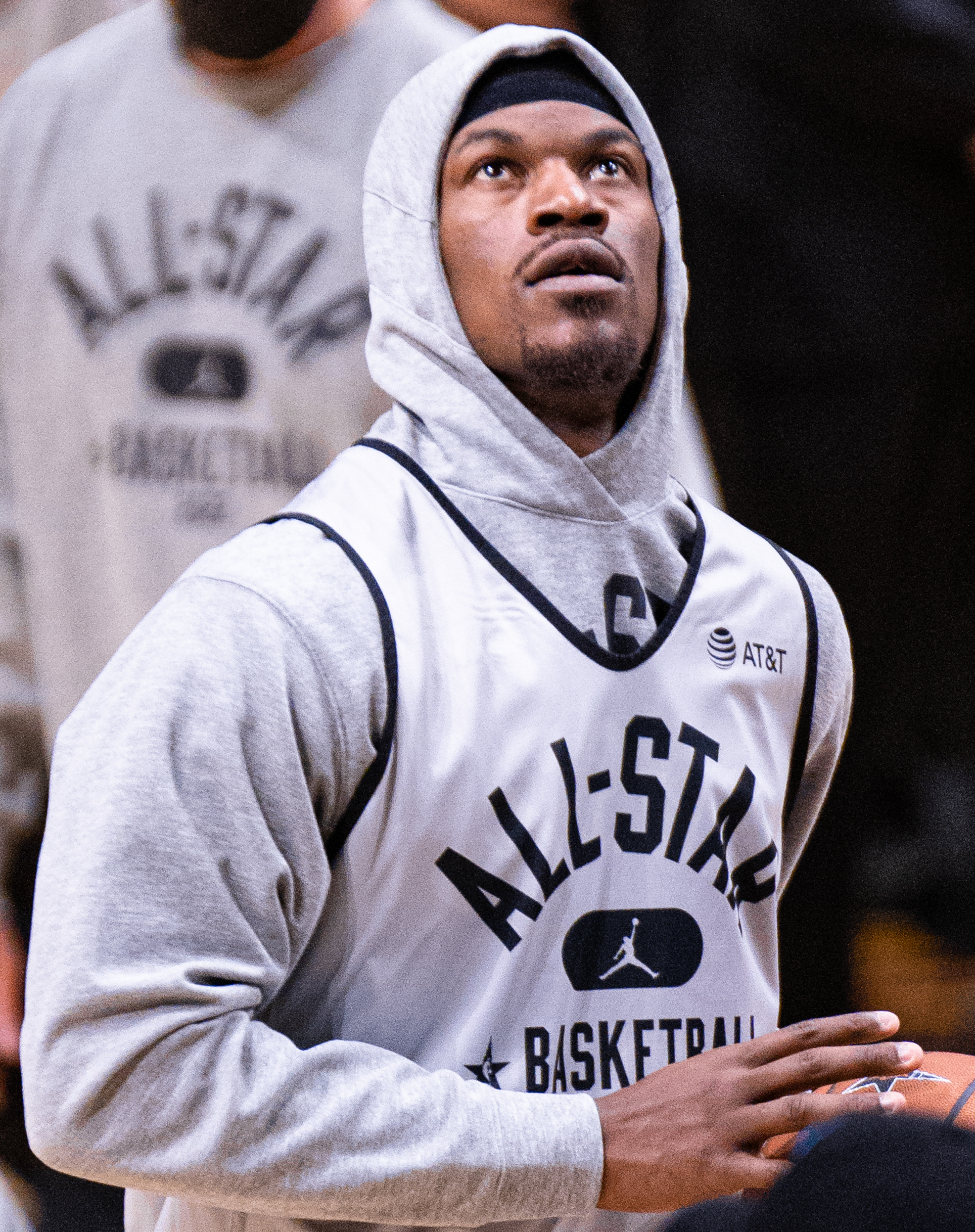
Jimmy Butler

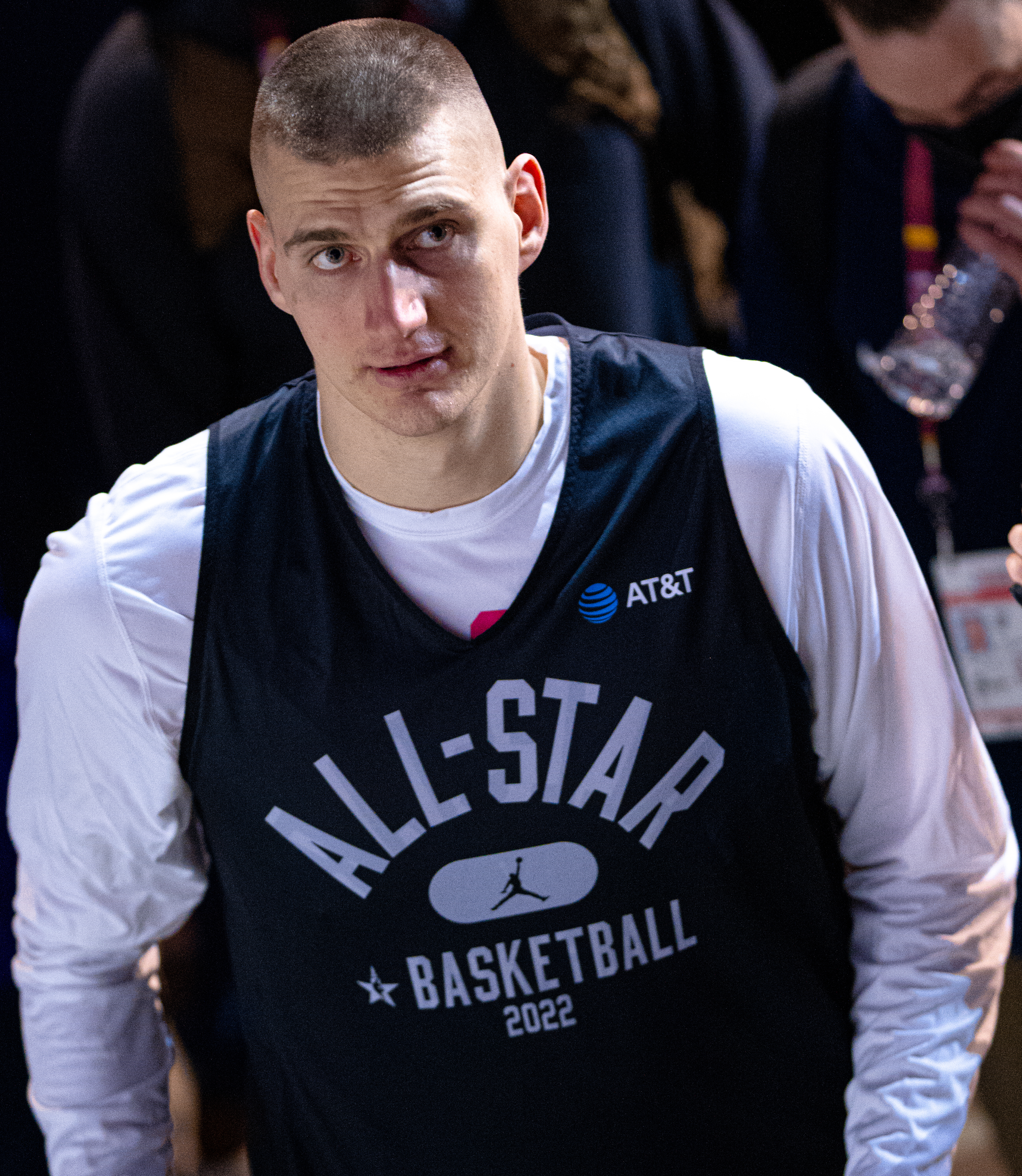
Nikola Jokić

Butler (left) has been noted for employing specific preparations to sleep, while Jokić (right) has been cited as a rare "non-napper" in the NBA.

Players' sleep schedules are extremely programmed. Many NBA players have cited mid-day naps on game days as being critical or vital. In 2011, Adam Silver, then the NBA's deputy commissioner, stated "Everyone in the league office knows not to call players at 3 p.m. It's the player nap." The length of naps varies from player-to-player. NBA guard Ty Lawson noted that he sleeps five hours during the night and then takes a three-hour nap during the daytime. Denver Nuggets guard Jamal Murray has stated that while in the NBA bubble, he slept for five hours following shoot-around, and regularly sleeps for two hours prior to games. Murray's teammate, Nikola Jokić sleeps for eight hours at night, though his status as a "non-napper" is considered rare in the NBA. Those players who do routinely employ scheduled naps have been noted to become irritable when their naps are interrupted.

In 2016, Ken Berger of CBS Sports wrote that NBA trainers, coaches, and owners had only then began realizing the devastating impact poor sleep habits can have on a player's longevity and injury rates, as well as an organization's financial bottom line. Some players, such as Danny Green and Rajon Rondo, have noted that early afternoon games disrupt their napping schedules.

Wanting to minimize the effects of travel on his sleeping patterns, NBA forward Tobias Harris was noted by ESPN to travel with an electroencephalogram (EEG) machine. Though having an efficacy debated by medical experts, Harris uses the EEG machine in order to engage in neurofeedback, believing that his daily 45-minute training sessions provide him with data to combat against fatigue. Some players ensure their sleeping is directly preceded by entering amply prepared environments, with LeBron James and Jimmy Butler being cited examples. James has been noted to employ a specific sleeping routine while playing on the road: in hotel rooms, James sets the temperature to between 68 °F (20 °C) and 70 °F (21 °C), shuts off nearby electronics 30 to 45 minutes before settling into bed, and uses the meditation app Calm to play back a field recording of rain falling on leaves in order to soothe him to sleep. Meanwhile, Butler targets nine hours of sleep, beginning at 7 p.m., which he prepares for by drinking herbal tea three hours earlier, avoiding all screen use, and using a cold air diffuser.

== See also ==
- Concussions in American football
- Sleep debt
