= Dave Finocchio =

American businessman

- Born: Mountain View, California
- Education: University of Notre Dame (B.A.)
- Occupations: Co-founder and CEO of Bleacher Report
- Spouse: Lauren

Dave Finocchio is an American businessman who co-founded the sports news website Bleacher Report, which is the second-largest digital sports publisher with over 45 million monthly readers. In 2012, Finocchio led the company through an acquisition by Turner Broadcasting System for approximately $175 million. He stepped away from daily operations of Bleacher Report in 2014 but returned to the company as its CEO in 2016.

== Career ==
Finocchio graduated from the University of Notre Dame with a bachelor's degree in economics and history. He lived in Alumni Hall.

=== Bleacher Report ===
Bleacher Report was founded in 2005 by David Finocchio, Alexander Freund, Bryan Goldberg, and Dave Nemetz while they were working in Silicon Valley—four friends and sports fans who had been high school classmates at Menlo School in Atherton, California. They saw that sports was not entertaining enough for younger fans, and sports journalists were out of touch with the college demographic. Finocchio found that events such as the NFL draft, the NBA free-agency window and the NBA trade deadline were not fully covered by sports journalism at the time. Using Google Insights, Finocchio discovered the stories people were searching for to build a media company. He mined data based on search traffic to discover what people wanted to see about every sport and team on a daily basis. Rather than focus on individual site views, Finocchio and his team focused on scaling their audience and introduced hundreds of newsletters based on specific teams and leagues. The newsletters showed high engagement rates with over 70 percent open rates. The newsletters, sent three times a week, included relevant stories from both Bleacher Report and other sources. Eventually, the newsletters were converted into a mobile app. The content was later adapted to social platforms as well.

During the first two years of running Bleacher Report, Finocchio worked part-time in private equity before leaving the industry to work with Bleacher Report full-time. In 2012, Turner Media acquired Bleacher Report for $175 million. In 2014, Finocchio stepped away from day-to-day responsibilities in the company. However, in 2016, he returned to the company as its CEO. In February 2019, Finocchio announced that he would step down as the company's CEO to be replaced by Howard Mittman.

=== The Cool Down ===
In 2022, Finocchio co-founded The Cool Down, a media platform covering climate solutions and environmentally-friendly living.

== Media appearances ==
Since the foundation of Bleacher Report, Finocchio has given commentary about what makes media companies successful and the future of the industry. His opinions have been featured in publications such as Business Insider, Digiday, Recode, Reuters, and Wired. In 2013, he spoke at the MIT Sloan Sports Analytics Conference sponsored by ESPN. Finocchio was also a speaker at Business Insider's Ignition conference in 2016, as well as GeekWire's Sports Tech Summit in 2017, where he discussed the future of sports media.
