= Lisa Dilling =

Climate scientist

- Education: Ph.D. University of California, Santa Barbara; B.A. Harvard University
- Awards: Leverhulme Visiting Professorship 2016-2017
- Scientific career
- Fields: climate change, decision making, science policy
- Workplaces: NOAA; NCAR; University of Colorado Boulder
- Website: https://www.colorado.edu/envs/lisa-dilling

Lisa Dilling is an interdisciplinary scholar who focuses on the energy transition, climate adaptation, decision making, the use of information, and science policy. She aims to improve the effectiveness of policies for climate change. Dilling is Associate Chief Scientist at the Environmental Defense Fund, an environmental non-profit that works on climate change, clean air and public health, and supporting the ability of people and nature to thrive.

== Early life and education ==
Born in Washington State, Dilling moved between the United States and Europe before college. Dilling graduated from the Menlo School in Atherton, California and went on to receive her Bachelor of Arts in Biology from Harvard University, graduating magna cum laude.| Dilling earned her Ph.D. from University of California, Santa Barbara in biological sciences, where she worked with Alice Alldredge. She went on to work for the National Oceanic and Atmospheric Administration (NOAA) and the National Center for Atmospheric Research (NCAR).

== Career and research ==
Lisa Dilling is known for her research on the usability of science in decision making, particularly in regard to managing climate changes. Specific research topics include: the energy transition, urban and rural water systems, climate resiliency of cities and municipalities, carbon management, geoengineering, and climate adaptation. Dilling studies how we make policy decisions about climate change, and focuses on the use of science in decision making for climate.

From 1995–2002 Dilling worked for the National Oceanic and Atmospheric Administration in the Office of Global Programs, managing a program on carbon cycle science research and collaborating across agencies in the U.S. Global Change Research Program. From 2002–2004 she worked at NCAR, and from 2004-2007 was a visiting fellow with CIRES. Dilling was co-lead of the first State of the Carbon Cycle Report, also known as Synthesis and Assessment Product 2.2.

From 2015 to 2023, Dilling was Professor of Environmental Studies at the University of Colorado, Boulder, a Fellow of the Cooperative Institute for Research in Environmental Sciences (CIRES), and a member of the Center for Socio-Environmental Futures (C-SEF). From 2014 to 2021, she was director of the Western Water Assessment, a CU Boulder and NOAA Regional Integrated Sciences and Assessment (RISA) program that works with decision makers to improve the use of science in managing the impacts of climate variability and climate change on water resources.

Dilling is Associate Chief Scientist/Vice President at the Environmental Defense Fund where she supports teams of scientists who produce cutting-edge research in service of protecting people and the planet. She is a member of the Board on Environmental Change and Society of the National Academies of Sciences, Engineering, and Medicine.

== Awards and honors ==
- National Science Foundation Graduate Fellowship in 1991-1993
- Dean John A. Knauss Marine Policy Fellowship in 1995
- CIRES Visiting Fellowship in 2004-2007
- Leverhulme Visiting Professorship at the University of Oxford in 2016-2017

== Publications ==
Lisa Dilling has published numerous articles and a book in her years of work, the majority of which focuses on the use of science and decision making for climate risk . Her earlier work focused on how various factors like marine snow affected marine life, such as zooplankton, and can impact the ocean's ability to cycle carbon. In the last two decades, Dilling has published several papers on carbon management, climate adaptation on public lands, geoengineering, the use of tools in water management, stakeholder needs and building networks for adaptive capacity, and the dynamics of vulnerability. Listed below are some of Dilling's most cited publications:

- "Creating usable science: Opportunities and constraints for climate knowledge use and their implications for science policy," Global Environmental Change, 2011
- "Making Climate HOT," Environment: Science and Policy for Sustainable Development, 2004.
- "Communicating Climate Change: Closing the Science-Action Gap," chapter in The Oxford Handbook of Climate Change and Society, 2011
- Creating a Climate for Change: Communicating Climate Change and Facilitating Social Change, a book Dilling co-edited and published, 2007
