= Menlo School =

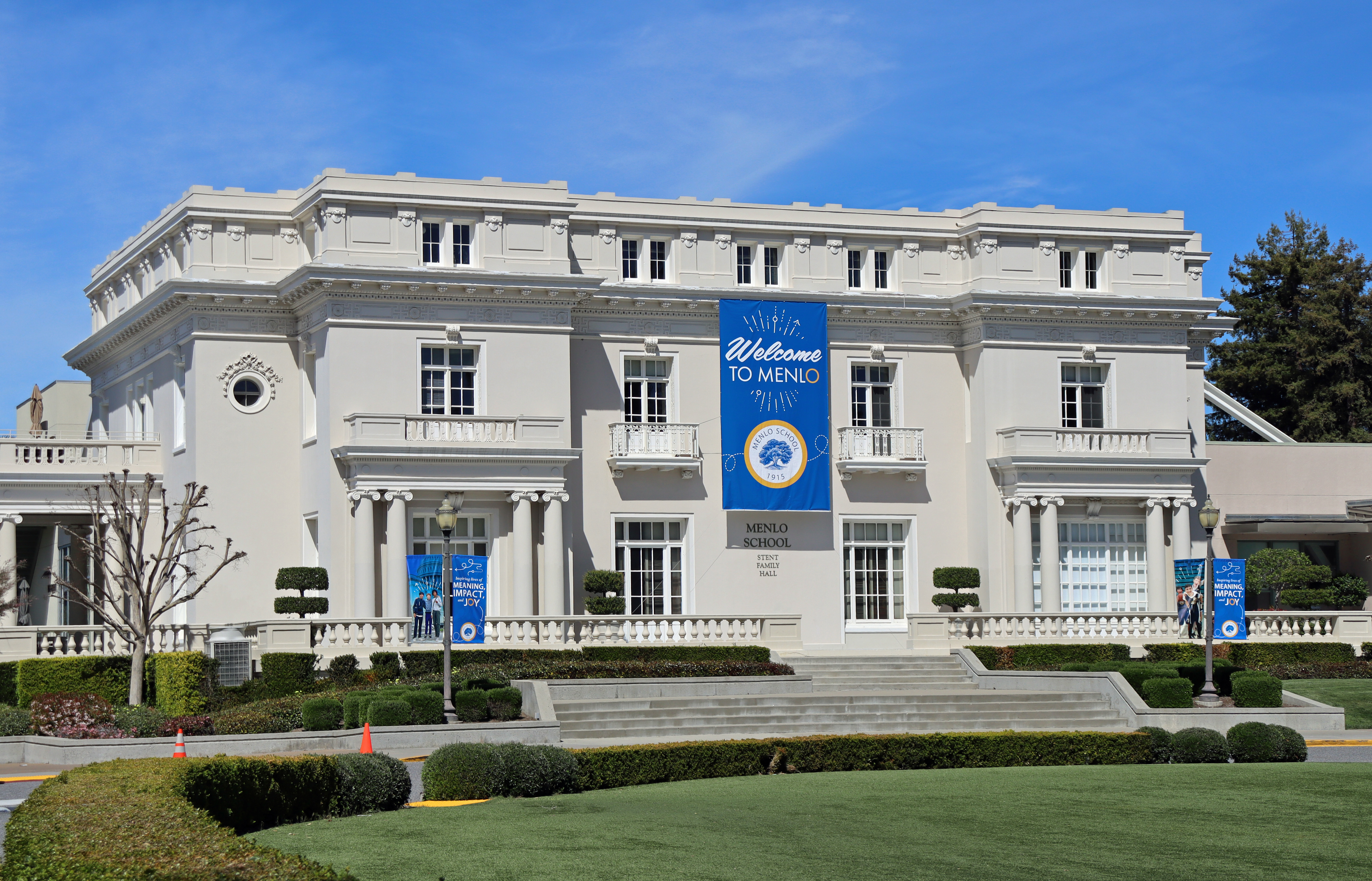
- Stent Hall

Location
- 50 Valparaiso Avenue; Atherton, California 94027; United States; 37°27′12″N 122°11′30″W

Information
- Former name: William Warren School
- Type: Independent
- Established: 1915
- Head of school: Than Healy
- Faculty: 106; 79 full-time 27 part-time
- Grades: 6–12
- Gender: coeducational
- Enrollment: 805 total 594 upper 211 middle
- Average class size: 18 students upper 18 students middle
- Student to teacher ratio: 8:1 upper 9:1 middle
- Colors: Navy and gold
- Mascot: Knight
- Annual tuition: $64,718 ['25/'26]
- Website: www.menloschool.org

Menlo School, commonly referred to as just Menlo, is a private college preparatory school in Atherton, California, United States. The school comprises a middle school, grades 6–8, with approximately 230 students and a high school, grades 9–12, with about 600 students. The middle and high school share a campus and have some overlapping administration, such as the Head of School.

Menlo was established in 1915 and in 1927, a junior college was added, which later became Menlo College. The college was formally separated from Menlo School in 1994, but the two institutions shared a number of facilities, including a single dining hall, until 2017, when Menlo School built a separate cafeteria.

Menlo School is accredited by the Western Association of Schools and Colleges and is a member of the National and California Associations of Independent Schools.

Menlo's tuition for the 2025–2026 school year is $64,718, a 20.28% increase from the 2014–2015 school year, adjusted for inflation using the Consumer Price Index.

== History ==
Menlo School was founded in 1915 as the William Warren School, an all-male military school with an inaugural enrollment of 13 boys. Warren, the founder and headmaster, sold the school in 1924 to a group of parents, who dropped the military focus and formed a new corporation under the name Menlo School for Boys.

In 1927, Menlo became a non-profit governed by a newly created board of trustees. A two-year junior college, Menlo College, was created that year as an expansion of the school. During the college's early years, Menlo offered a hybrid prep school and junior college education. Students would attend the school for the latter two years of high school, then the college for two years, and then transferred directly into four-year universities as upper-division students.

In the fall of 1979, Menlo School began transitioning from a boys-only school with a small boarding program to a coeducational day school. In the 1993–1994 academic year, Menlo further moved to increase the upper school's enrollment, added grade 6 to the middle school, and further expanded its female enrollment.

The college and school were split on June 30, 1994, with further, more specific separations following. Menlo School and Menlo College became formally independent entities with separate boards, administrations, and faculties. In 2008, they further agreed to the formal legal subdivision of their hitherto shared land into two separate parcels. The only area of the campus that continues to be jointly owned and managed is the Menlo Athletic Quad, consisting of the athletic fields and track.

Following a fundraising effort that began in the late 1990s, both the middle and upper school campuses have been mostly rebuilt. The projects were completed in 1999 and 2004, respectively.

== Student life ==
Menlo offers more than 50 student clubs in the Upper School and 25 in middle school. These include a chapter of the Fellowship of Christian Athletes, Model United Nations organization, Junior Classical League, Surfrider Foundation, Mock Trial (winner of many competitions), cybersecurity club, beekeeping club, chess club, garden club, and environmental club. In total, the Upper School has over 50 clubs and affinity groups. Both the Upper and Middle schools have active student councils.

=== Student publications ===
The Upper School's student-run newspaper, The Coat of Arms, has won awards, including Top Honors – First Place with Special Merit from the American Scholastic Press Association. The Coat of Arms releases roughly six issues a year. It produces content for its online site and Instagram every few days.

The Coat of Arms periodically publishes special editions on sensitive topics. In March 2023, a special edition covering sexual assault and harassment contained a collection of articles about those topics, including survivor stories from students at Menlo's Upper School, as well as statistical information from a survey the school conducted about the prevalence of sexual assault and harassment in student's lives.

The Menlo Bard is a student-produced digital news magazine about arts and lifestyles. It has been around since 2012 and it is currently published semiannually.

=== Mock Trial ===
As of March 2026, Menlo's Mock Trial team has won San Mateo County competitions in 17 out of the past 19 years and has been in the top 8 at the California State Championships in 10 of the last 14 years. From 2011 to 2018, it had a perfect 80–0 record in the county. The team won the California State Championship in 2014, defeating the three-time defending champion La Reina High School of Ventura County. In 2019, they won against Shasta High School of Shasta County. They also won in the state championship in 2023. Outside California, the team won the Providence Cup, a pre-season national mock trial tournament held in Denver, Colorado, in 2011, 2012, 2014, 2015, 2016, 2019, 2020, and 2021. In 2023, Menlo School placed second at Providence. Menlo won the American Championship Invitational, a tournament for states' second and third place squads, in 2009. Team members Andy Parker and Tiffany Tam won the Gladiator Individual World Championships in 2016 and 2018, respectively.

With Stanford Mock Trial, Menlo also hosts the annual NorCal Mock Trial Invitational, the first tournament in California outside the normal CRF competition to be scored; as of April 2022 they have won the tournament in 7 of the past 11 years.

=== Other activities ===
The school puts on musicals and plays. Artistic groups include Menlo Dance Enrichment, who produce an annual dance show, a chamber orchestra, and three choruses.

Athletics teams include baseball, basketball, cross-country, boys football, girls flag football, golf, lacrosse, soccer, softball, swimming, tennis, track, water polo, and volleyball. The Knights previously competed in the Peninsula Athletic League, and now compete in the West Bay Athletic League. During the 2009–2010 school year, every varsity team participated in postseason competition, and some went on to state competitions. The boys' tennis team claimed the national tennis title at the National High School All-American Foundation in 2010, placed second in 2011, and won again in 2012 and 2018.

=== MTerm ===
MTerm is an end-of-year enrichment opportunity for freshman, sophomore, and junior classes. In the 2017–2018 school year, it replaced Knight School, which was a one-week period that offered experiences such as volunteer trips to work with Habitat for Humanity in New Orleans, cooking classes, and video game design seminars instead of conventional classes.

During MTerm, which takes place in May, each grade level focuses on a different topic. Freshmen study environmental issues and spend half of MTerm on campus, participating in educational activities and workshops, and the other half on day trips to explore local ecosystems and conservation efforts. Sophomores delve into social issues such as equity and justice, participating in discussions and activities that explore these topics in depth. Juniors participate in a Junior Project, where they research and investigate a topic of their choice and present their findings to their grade. Seniors, through a program called Life After Menlo, focus on life after high school and building connections with their classmates before they graduate and move on to college. All students in grades 9–11 have the option to participate in a travel program as part of their MTerm experience.

In 2022, due to the ongoing COVID-19 pandemic and the complications it caused for global travel, the traditional Menlo Abroad program was temporarily suspended. In its place, the school introduced The Borderlands program, which focused on trips to Arizona and Texas to educate students about the Navajo Nation, issues of sustainability, and the complexities of the US–Mexico border. In 2023, the travel programs offered consisted of the three Borderlands trips from 2022, as well as a Menlo Abroad trip to Costa Rica. The program added trips to Cambodia and Tanzania in 2024.

== Buildings ==
Menlo's athletic center contains two basketball courts, one full-sized, with drop-down volleyball nets. The gym also has athletic training rooms, a dance room, conference rooms, offices, workout facilities, and locker rooms.

The Creative Arts and Design Center contains spaces for artists in the upper school, and has band and dance rooms. The upper floor includes drama, photography, journalism and computer science classrooms.

The Spieker Center for the Arts was finished and unveiled in 2021 and includes a theater. The Spieker Center's basement houses storage spaces along with a green room and dressing rooms.

Stent Hall, once a mansion called Douglass Hall, was badly damaged in the 1989 Loma Prieta earthquake and was closed for several years. At first the school wanted to demolish it, but protests convinced them to restore it. A new dining hall, student center and library were added on to Stent Hall in 2017. Structural steel and concrete shear walls were used in the new classroom and adjacent new library to help bolster up the hall.

== Academic programs ==
In order to graduate, upper school students are required to complete 10 community service credits each year, events put on by the school or another organization. Menlo also has peer leadership and advocacy programs where students advocate within their group for all four years of high school.

== Faculty ==
Nathaniel (Than) Healy has been the head of school since 2013 after replacing Norm Colb. John Schafer has been the Upper School Director since 2007. La Vina Lowery joined Menlo in 2015 as the Middle School Director. The Director of Athletics is John Farmer.

== Demographics ==
Menlo School Student Demographic Profile (NH = Non-Hispanic)
Race	% 2022–2023
White (NH)	42%
Asian (NH)	25%
Mixed race (NH)	13%
Hispanic or Latino (any race)	10%
Black or African American (NH)	3%
Middle Eastern (NH)	2%
Pacific Islander (NH)	2%
Some other race/not reported	3%

In a speech delivered on May 4, 2023, Head of School Than Healy revealed a shift in the demographics of Menlo students. According to Healy, in 2013, 29% of the student body self-identified as students of color, whereas in 2023, this figure had surged to 55%.

This demographic change came after Menlo instituted an Equity, Diversity, Inclusion, and Belonging program. In the 2015–2016 Diversity Strategic Plan, a goal of the school was to admit more students of color. They would achieve by gathering data of which schools students of color came from before conducting visits to these schools to improve bilateral relationships. To ensure Menlo met these goals, they would analyze admissions data to ensure significant demographic "improvements" occurred. Keith B. Wheeler II led the EDIB program until his departure in 2023. Since 2024, Marco Menéndez does. As of the 2025–2026 school year, Carmen Borbón is the current Director of Institutional Belonging.

== Traditions ==
=== Valpo Bowl ===
The Valparaiso (Valpo) Bowl is an annual football game between Menlo School and the neighboring Sacred Heart that raises money for a local educational charity. The first game was held in 2003. The Valpo Bowl name stems from both schools having a main entrance on Valparaiso Avenue.

Menlo won the following years: 2003, 2004, 2006, 2007, 2009, 2011, 2016, 2021, 2024, and 2025.

== Notable alumni ==
- Kevin Bass - All-Star outfielder for the Houston Astros who also played for the Milwaukee Brewers, San Francisco Giants, New York Mets and Baltimore Orioles
- Carlton Beal - American businessman, college professor and polo player
- Jon Beekhuis - former race car driver, television commentator.
- Robert (Bob) Billingham - American sailor and Olympic medalist
- Jaye Boissiere - American professional soccer player
- Mike Bordin - professional drummer for Ozzy Osbourne and co-founder of Faith No More
- Allison Brennan - New York Times bestselling author of thrillers
- Maria Fadiman - ethnobotanist; named a 2006 National Geographic Society Emerging Explorer
- Dave Finocchio, Zander Freund, Bryan Goldberg and Dave Nemetz - founders of Bleacher Report
- Jon Fogarty - professional race car driver
- Daniel Goldstein - musician, electronic music producer, and DJ better known by his stage name Lane 8
- Brad Greenspan - internet entrepreneur and co-founder of Myspace
- Dave Guard - American folk singer and founding member of founding members of the Kingston Trio. Class of 1952
- Lisa Dilling - interdisciplinary scholar and climate scientist
- Scott Harris - President of Baseball Operations for the Detroit Tigers
- Fredric Hobbs - American artist and filmmaker
- Gary Johnson - baseball player, played five games with the Anaheim Angels
- Robby Krieger - guitarist, member of The Doors
- Glenn Layendecker - former professional tennis player
- Richard Li - Hong Kong businessman and philanthropist
- Robert (Bob) Lurie - real estate magnate, philanthropist, and former San Francisco Giants owner
- Rebecca Ma - entrepreneur and social media influencer known as "Becca Bloom"
- John Matteson - biographer, 2008 Pulitzer Prize winner for Eden's Outcasts: The Story of Louisa May Alcott and Her Father
- Ahna O'Reilly - actress
- Chris Paine - filmmaker; writer and director of Who Killed the Electric Car?
- John Paye - former Stanford starting quarterback and basketball point guard; later drafted by the San Francisco 49ers
- Kate Paye - former Stanford women's basketball player; current Stanford Cardinal women's basketball head coach
- Madeline (Maddy) Price - Canadian athlete who competed as part of the Canadian Olympic team at the 2020 Summer Olympics in Tokyo
- Anthony Pritzker, businessman and philanthropist, member of the Pritzker family
- Quadeca - YouTuber, hip hop artist, producer, and former video game commentator
- Eric Reveno - former Stanford basketball player; current men's associate head coach at Stanford
- Jerry Rice Jr. - American former professional football player. Son of Jerry Rice
- Veronica Rossman - United States Appellate Judge. Class of 1990.
- Brandon Schneider - president and COO of the Golden State Warriors who was in the class of 1997 (not to be confused with Brandon Schneider)
- Don Tollefson - American television broadcast journalist. Class of 1969
- Wilfred Steven Uytengsu, Filipino sports and business executive
- Bob Weir - founding member Grateful Dead who attended in 1962
- Nick Woodman - founder and CEO of GoPro

== See also ==
- San Mateo County high schools
- National Association of Independent Schools
