= Jerry Rice Jr. =

American gridiron football player (born 1991)

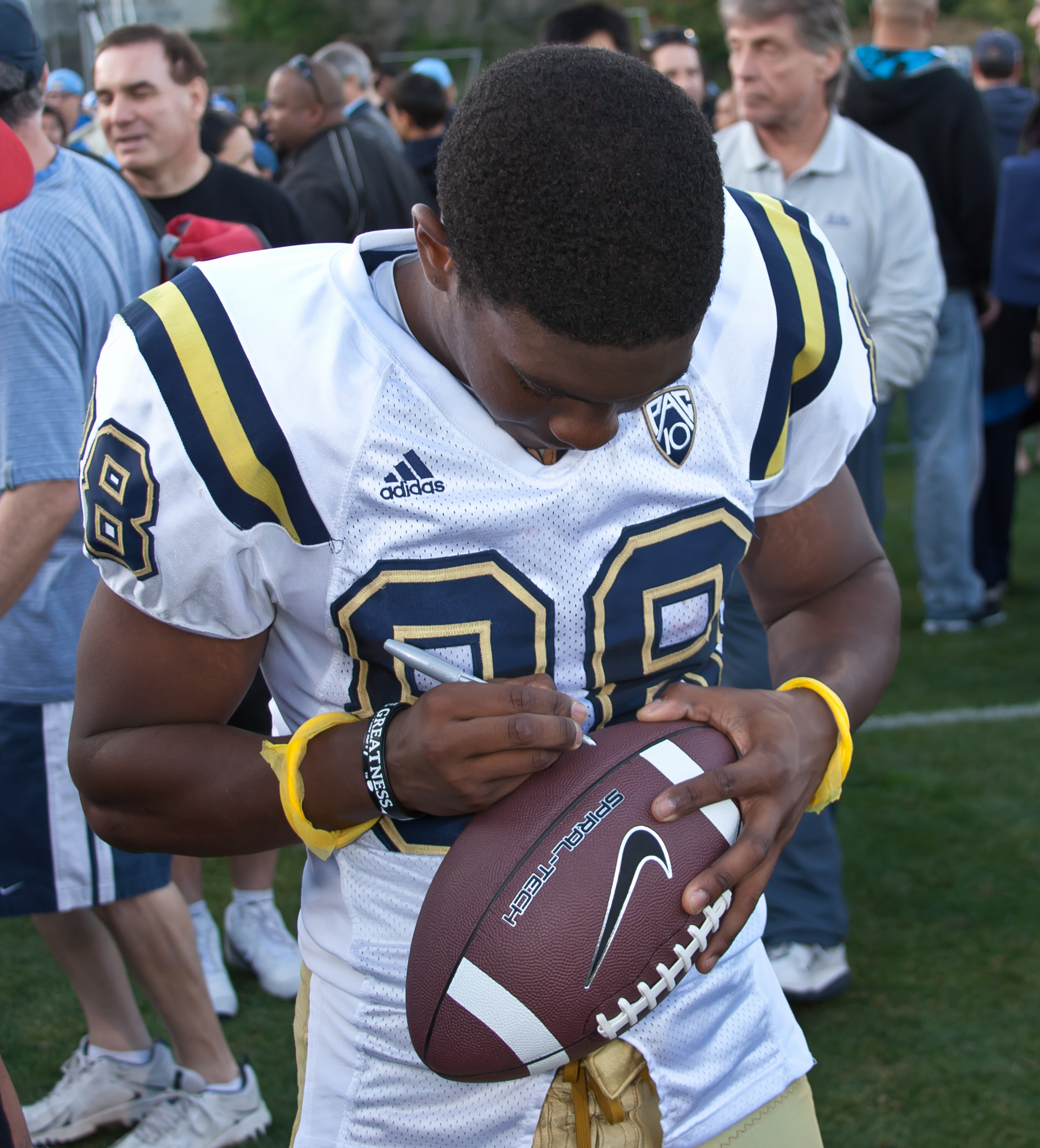
- Rice with UCLA in 2011

No. 82
- Position: Wide receiver

Personal information
- Born: July 27, 1991 (age 35); Atherton, California, U.S.
- Listed height: 5 ft 10 in (1.78 m)
- Listed weight: 185 lb (84 kg)

Career information
- High school: Menlo (Atherton, California)
- College: UCLA (2009–2012); UNLV (2013)
- NFL draft: 2014: undrafted

Career history
- Washington Redskins (2014); Montreal Alouettes (2015–2016)*
- * Offseason or practice squad member only
- Stats at Pro Football Reference

Jerry Lee Rice Jr. (born July 27, 1991) is an American former football wide receiver. He played college football for the UCLA Bruins and UNLV Rebels. He was signed by the Washington Commanders as an undrafted free agent in 2014, but did not play in an NFL game. Rice is the son of Pro Football Hall of Fame receiver Jerry Rice.

== Early life and college ==
Rice was born in Atherton, California and graduated from Menlo School. He played college football at the University of California, Los Angeles, graduating with a bachelor's degree in June 2013. He decided to forgo his final year of eligibility with the Bruins to earn his master's degree at the University of Nevada, Las Vegas, where he also played football with the Rebels.

== Professional career ==
Pre-draft measurables
Height	Weight	Arm length	Hand span	Wingspan	40-yard dash	10-yard split	20-yard split	20-yard shuttle	Three-cone drill	Vertical jump	Broad jump	Bench press
5 ft 10 1/8 in (1.78 m)	185 lb (84 kg)	29 3/8 in (0.75 m)	8 3/4 in (0.22 m)	5 ft 10 5/8 in (1.79 m)	4.68 s	1.62 s	2.75 s	4.43 s	7.27 s	33.0 in (0.84 m)	8 ft 10 in (2.69 m)	9 reps
All values from Pro Day

=== Washington Redskins ===
After his college career, Rice had a try out for the Baltimore Ravens, but wasn't signed. Rice also tried out for the San Francisco 49ers, his father's former team. On June 26, 2014, he signed a contract with the Washington Redskins. On August 1, he suffered a torn labrum in training camp. Two days later, the Redskins waived him with an injury designation. After clearing waivers, he was placed on the Redskins' injured reserve.

On May 4, 2015, he was waived by the Redskins.

=== Montreal Alouettes ===
Rice was signed to the practice roster of the Montreal Alouettes of the Canadian Football League on October 8, 2015. On June 14, 2016, he was released by the Alouettes.

== Personal life ==
Rice is the second oldest of four children and the son of Jerry Rice and older brother of Brenden Rice. He is also the second cousin of Jordan Matthews, who also became an NFL receiver.
