= Allison Brennan =

American novelist (born 1969)

- Born: September 29, 1969 (age 56); San Carlos, California, U.S.
- Education: Menlo School; University of California, Santa Cruz
- Occupation: Novelist
- Spouse: Dan Brennan (1993–present)
- Children: 5
- Writing career
- Language: English
- Period: 2005–present
- Genres: Suspense thrillers, mysteries
- Website: allisonbrennan.com

Allison Brennan (born September 29, 1969) is an American best-selling writer of romantic thriller novels. Her first book was published in 2005.

== Biography ==
Brennan was born in San Carlos, California. In 1987, she graduated from Menlo School in Atherton, California, and attended college at UC Santa Cruz from 1987 to 1989, working as a legislative consultant in the California State Legislature from 1992 to 2005. In 1993, she married Dan Brennan, and they have five children. She currently resides in Arizona.

Since 2005, Brennan has published numerous novels, several of which have been translated into Japanese, Norwegian, German, Spanish, French, and Italian. Most of her books have been New York Times best-sellers.

== Bibliography ==
=== Novels ===
==== Predator trilogy ====
- The Prey (December 27, 2005)
  - Translated into German by Edith Waller as Leichte Beute, 2009, ISBN 9783453722330
  - Translated into Spanish by Alberto Magnet as La presa, 2006
- The Hunt (January 31, 2006)
  - Translated into German by Edith Walter as Lauf oder stirb, 2008
  - Translated into Spanish by Alberto Magnet as La caza, 2007
  - Translated into Japanese by Andō Yukiko yaku as Hanto, 2007
- The Kill (February 28, 2006)
  - Translated into German by Edith Walter as Sieh dich vor, 2009
  - Translated into Spanish by Martín Rodríguez-Courel Ginzo as La trampa, 2007

==== No Evil trilogy ====
- Speak No Evil (January 30, 2007)
  - Translated into German by Sabine Schilasky as Hass soll dich zerstören (2009)
  - Translated into Japanese by Andō Yukiko as 唇...塞がれて. 下 / Kuchibiru fusagarete
- See No Evil (February 27, 2007)
  - Translated into German by Sabine Schilasky as Rache wird dich treffen, 2010
  - Translated into Japanese by Andō Yukiko as 瞳...閉ざされて. 下 / Hitomi tozasarete
- Fear No Evil (March 27, 2007)
  - Translated into German by Sabine Schilasky as Furcht soll dich begleiten (2010)

==== Prison Break trilogy ====
- Killing Fear (January 29, 2008)
  - Translated into Italian by Matteo Diari as Omicidi a luci rosse, 2008, ISBN 9788834714065
- Tempting Evil (May 20, 2008)
- Playing Dead (September 30, 2008)

==== FBI trilogy ====
- Sudden Death (March 24, 2009)
- Fatal Secrets (May 19, 2009)
- Cutting Edge (July 28, 2009)

==== 7 Deadly Sins ====
- Original Sin (February 10, 2010)
  - Translated into German by Irene Eisenhut as Sündenjagd
- Carnal Sin (June 2010)

==== Lucy Kincaid ====
- Love Me to Death (December 28, 2010)
- Kiss Me, Kill Me (February 22, 2011)
- If I Should Die (November 22, 2011, includes novella "Love is Murder")
- Silenced (April 24, 2012)
- Stalked (October 30, 2012)
- Stolen (June 4, 2013)
- Cold Snap (October 29, 2013, includes novella "Reckless" in the mass market paperback)
- Dead Heat (June 3, 2014)
- Best Laid Plans (August 4, 2015)
- No Good Deed (November 3, 2015)
- The Lost Girls (November 1, 2016)
- Make Them Pay (March 7, 2017)
- Breaking Point (January 30, 2018)
- Too Far Gone (October 30, 2018)
- Nothing to Hide (April 30, 2019)
- Cut and Run (March 31, 2019)
- No Way Out (June 2, 2020)

==== Max Revere novels ====
1. Notorious (March 2014)
2. Compulsion (April 2015)
3. Poisonous (April 2016)
4. Shattered (August 2017)
5. Abandoned (August 2018)

=== Short stories and novellas ===
- "Killing Justice" (in Killer Year, January 2008)
- "Deliver Us From Evil" (in What You Can't See, January 2008)
- "A Capitol Obsession" (in Two of the Deadliest, July 2009)
- "Her Lucky Day" (in Blood Lite II, October 2010)
- "Ghostly Justice" (in Entangled, October 2011)
- "Above Reproach" (in Guns N' Roses, February 2012)
- "Vacation Interrupted" (in Love Is Murder, June 2012)
- "Murder in the River City" (digital novella, August 2012)
- "Reckless " (Lucy Kincaid digital novella, March 2013, later appears in print in 2013's Cold Snap)
- "Maximum Exposure" (Max Revere novella, April 2014)
- "Aim to Kill " (novella in Sweet Dreams boxed set, May 2015)
- "Two to Die For" (Max Revere digital novella, September 2017)
- "Storm Warning" (Lucy Kincaid digital novella, April 2019)
- "A Deeper Fear" (Lucy Kincaid digital novella, January 2021)
