= John Matteson =

American journalist

John Matteson (born March 3, 1961) is an American professor of English and legal writing at John Jay College of Criminal Justice in New York City. He won the 2008 Pulitzer Prize for Biography or Autobiography for his first book, Eden's Outcasts: The Story of Louisa May Alcott and Her Father.

Born in San Mateo, California, Matteson is the son of Thomas D. Matteson (1920–2011), an airline executive jointly responsible for developing the theory of reliability-centered maintenance, and Rosemary H. Matteson (1920–2010), who worked as a commercial artist before becoming a homemaker.

Matteson attended Menlo School in Atherton, California. He graduated with an A.B. in history from Princeton University in 1983 after completing an 178-page-long senior thesis titled "The Confederate Cotton Embargo, 1861-1862: A Study in States' Rights." He then received a J.D. from Harvard Law School in 1986, and a Ph.D. in English from Columbia University in 1999. He served as a law clerk for U.S. District Court Judge Terrence W. Boyle before working as a litigation attorney at Titchell, Maltzman, Mark, Bass, Ohleyer & Mishel in San Francisco and with Maupin, Taylor, Ellis & Adams in Raleigh, North Carolina. He has written articles for a wide variety of publications, including The New York Times, The Wall Street Journal, The New England Quarterly, Streams of William James, and Leviathan: A Journal of Melville Studies.

His second book, after Eden's Outcasts, was The Lives of Margaret Fuller. It was published in January 2012 and received the 2012 Ann M. Sperber Prize as the year's outstanding biography of a journalist or other figure in media. It was also a finalist for the inaugural Plutarch Award, the prize for best biography of the year as chosen by the Biographers International Organization (BIO), and was shortlisted for the PEN/Jacqueline Bograd Weld Award for Biography. His W. W. Norton & Company annotated edition of Little Women was published in November 2015, featuring many exclusive photographs from Alcott's childhood home, Orchard House, as well as numerous illustrations and stills from the various film adaptations. Matteson's most recent book, A Worse Place Than Hell: How the Civil War Battle of Fredericksburg Changed a Nation, was published in February 2021. It focuses on Walt Whitman, Oliver Wendell Holmes Jr., Louisa May Alcott, Arthur Buckminster Fuller, and John Pelham.

Matteson appeared in the 2018 documentary Orchard House: Home of Little Women.

Matteson is a former treasurer of the Melville Society and is a member of the Louisa May Alcott Society's advisory board. Matteson is a fellow of the Massachusetts Historical Society and has served as the deputy director of the Leon Levy Center for Biography. He married Michelle Rollo in 1991. Since 2023, Matteson has divided his time between his principal home in the Bronx, New York and a secondary residence in Lyon, France.

He is not the same person as the John Matteson who, as a professor of speech at Los Angeles City College in 2008, allegedly barred a student from giving a classroom speech in opposition to same-sex marriage.
