= Bleacher Report =

Sports-related website

- Company type: Subsidiary
- Owner: Skydance Corporation
- Founders: David Finocchio; Alexander Freund; Bryan Goldberg; Dave Nemetz
- Parent: TNT Sports Interactive
- Subsidiaries: House of Highlights
- Website: bleacherreport.com
- Registration: Optional
- Launched: 2005; 21 years ago

Bleacher Report (often abbreviated as B/R) is a website that focuses on sports and sports culture. Its headquarters are in San Francisco, with offices in New York City and London. Bleacher Report was acquired by Time Warner's Turner Broadcasting System in August 2012 for $175 million. In March 2018, Bleacher Report and Turner Sports launched B/R Live, a subscription video streaming service featuring live broadcasts of several major sports events, although the service was discontinued in 2021 and merged with the company's mobile app. Bleacher Report owns multi-media social network House of Highlights, and its branding was used for Max's sports coverage prior to 2025.

== History ==
=== Founding: 2005–2011 ===
Bleacher Report was formed in 2005 by Dave Finocchio, Zander Freund, Bryan Goldberg, and Dave Nemetz—four friends and sports fans who were high school classmates at Menlo School in Atherton, California. Inspired by Ken Griffey Jr., they wanted to start writing about sports. With the help of two old friends, J. B. Long and Ryan Alberti, the company's nucleus took up residence in a Menlo Park office space, in the spring of 2007, for $650 a month.

Bleacher Report announced the completion of a round of Series A funding on the occasion of its public launch in February 2008. The undisclosed sum came from Hillsven Capital, Transcoast Capital, and Vimeo founder Jakob Lodwick. Eight months later, in October 2008, Bleacher Report secured $3.5 million in Series B funding from Hillsven, Gordon Crawford, and SoftTech VC. Under the Turner corporate umbrella, Finocchio remains at Bleacher Report as the CEO. Goldberg and Nemetz transitioned out of their respective VP roles during the integration process. Freund left the company in 2009. A Series C round in December 2010, led by Crosslink Capital, netted an additional $10.5 million.

Bleacher Report named Brian Grey as its chief executive officer in 2010. Grey came to Bleacher Report from leadership roles at Fox Sports Interactive and Yahoo! Sports. In the first year of Grey's tenure, Bleacher Report filled two more executive-level positions, adding Rich Calacci as chief revenue officer and Drew Atherton as chief financial officer. Calacci joined the company in May 2011; Atherton followed a month later in June.

In August 2011, the company announced a $22 million growth round led by Oak Investment Partners, with participation from Crosslink and Hillsven. At the time, Oak general partner Fred Harman, a board member at both The Huffington Post and Demand Media, characterized the investment as a bet on Bleacher Report's ability to keep pace with real-time fan interest across all forms of social media.

For many years after its founding, Bleacher Report was one of the few mainstream sports websites in the United States that regularly covered professional wrestling, as the genre is generally seen as a form of entertainment within the U.S. due to the open secret that professional wrestling is staged. This continued under Turner ownership, as Turner had once owned World Championship Wrestling. Following WWE and ESPN beginning to collaborate on projects on a regular basis in 2014, other mainstream sports outlets now cover professional wrestling, with Bleacher Report having strengthened theirs by forming a partnership with All Elite Wrestling to be the exclusive home to their pay-per-view events in the United States, as well as parent company Turner having broadcasting rights to AEW Dynamite and AEW Rampage.

=== Turner Sports acquisition: 2012–present ===
Bleacher Report's sale to Time Warner (via Turner Sports) was announced on August 6, 2012. Under the terms of the deal, Grey, Finocchio, Calacci, and CTO Sam Parnell all assumed official Turner Sports titles while retaining their management responsibilities at Bleacher Report. In a press release announcing the purchase, Turner president of sales, distribution, and sports David Levy cited the site's rapid growth and loyal user base as key factors in his company's decision to make a deal—and also alluded to the potential value of Bleacher Report's multimedia platform as an outlet for Turner's various video resources:

As brand builders and content providers, we were attracted to Bleacher Report's fast growth to a leading marketplace position and a valued consumer destination. The site will continue to innovate and provide users and sports fans with branded news and information. With our expansive digital rights and resources, Turner will further ensure Bleacher Report's continued growth and success.

Nemetz continued with the company for eight months after the acquisition, going on to advise and invest in other media platforms including Elite Daily and Bustle. As part of the integration process, Atherton's CFO responsibilities were assumed by Turner corporate in February 2013, and Grey stepped down from the CEO position in October 2013. After Grey's departure, Finocchio headed Bleacher Report, reporting to Turner Sports Chief Operating Officer, Matt Hong, up until September 2014.

In May 2014, Bleacher Report launched Game of Zones, a parody of HBO's Game of Thrones featuring animated NBA figures. In September 2014, Bleacher Report named Dorth Raphaely General Manager, taking over for Finocchio, following his departure as CEO. In 2015, Bleacher Report acquired the popular sports-themed Instagram page House of Highlights. In January 2016, Finocchio returned to Bleacher Report as CEO. In October 2016, Bleacher Report launched Gridiron Heights, a cartoon web series featuring satirical portrayals of NFL stars and executives. In February 2017, the company announced that it was laying off over 50 employees, as the site stepped away from its open content model.

In July 2017, Bleacher Report announced that it named Howard Mittman as chief revenue officer and chief marketing officer. In September 2018, Bleacher Report launched the first episode of The Champions, an animated show involving the current Champions League members of that season. There are currently seven seasons of the show. In February 2019, Turner announced a deal with casino operator Caesars Entertainment Corporation to open a Bleacher Report studio at the Caesars Palace sportsbook, from which the site would produce sports betting-oriented content. Later that month, it named Mittman as CEO, following Finocchio's resignation. In June 2020, Mittman resigned as CEO of Bleacher Report, following staff concerns regarding a lack of diversity at the company. Lenny Daniels, president of Turner Sports, would take over as CEO.

After Game of Zones ended in 2020, it was replaced with another NBA-centric series called Hero Ball, which parodies several anime shows and tropes.

In 2021, in conjunction with the NHL on TNT, Bleacher Report launched a new ice hockey vertical known as B/R Open Ice; the site hired social media personality Andrew "Nasher" Telfer to lead the new outlet.

In January 2025, the National Football League announced an agreement with Bleacher Report, allowing it to distribute video highlights and game recaps via its platforms, as well as receive expanded access to league players, personnel, and tentpole events such as the NFL Scouting Combine, draft, and the Super Bowl as part of its football coverage.

== Verticals ==
Bleacher Report operates various verticals devoted to specific sports and activities, which include dedicated online, video, and social media content;

- B/R Betting: Launched in 2019, and dedicated to sports betting-oriented content.
- B/R Football: Dedicated to soccer (association football) content.
- B/R Gaming: Launched in 2016, and dedicated to video gaming and esports content.
- B/R Gridiron: Launched in August 2019, and dedicated to NFL and college football content. The launch lineup featured web series such as Ditch the Playbook with Adam Lefkoe, the NFL Betting Show, the fantasy football show Your Fantasy Fire Drill, and Untold Stories with Master Tesfatsion, as well as its existing animated shorts Gridiron Heights.
- B/R Cartoons: Launched in May of 2026, and dedicated to cartoon content with series such as Gridiron Heights, The Champions, and Big College Noon Day.
- B/R Hoops: Dedicated to basketball content.
- B/R Kicks: Launched in 2018, and dedicated to sneakers and sneaker collecting.
- B/R Open Ice: Launched in September 2021, and dedicated to the National Hockey League.
- B/R W Sports: Dedicated to women's sports; the vertical was originally established as HighlightHER in 2019, before being relaunched in January 2025.
- House of Highlights: Social media accounts devoted to sports highlight videos; acquired by Bleacher Report in 2015.

== B/R Live ==
In March 2018, Bleacher Report announced a new internet television service known as B/R Live. The service features original studio programming, as well as live event coverage from Turner properties and other sources, including NBA League Pass, all UEFA Champions League and UEFA Europa League matches, the PGA Championship, NCAA championships, the National Lacrosse League, and The Spring League. B/R Live offers both subscription and per-event pricing, and will also support the NBA's planned microtransaction service to allow users to purchase five-minute look-ins of a live game. B/R Live also streams all of the All Elite Wrestling (AEW) pay-per-view events.

On November 23, 2018, the service streamed The Match: Tiger vs. Phil, a match play golf event between Tiger Woods and Phil Mickelson. Meant as a pay-per-view event, the PPV system struggled to keep up with demand, prompting B/R Live to stream the event for free instead, and all buyers being offered refunds.

B/R Live was shut down and merged into the Bleacher Report app in June 2021. As a spiritual successor, TNT Sports launched a Bleacher Report-branded streaming hub on Max in October 2023.

== Reception ==
=== Criticism ===
Early criticism of Bleacher Report stemmed from the network's initial commitment to an open publishing model. Such critiques cited the fact that all registered users on the website were permitted to publish articles on the site, arguing that Bleacher Report's policy resulted in a glut of low-quality content, which made it difficult for the network's readers to find credible coverage of their favorite teams and sports. It was also argued that the model tarnished the reputation of every writer associated with the Bleacher Report brand, which made it difficult for the network's more talented contributors to build loyal audiences, and that it empowered unqualified writers without editorial oversight, which compromised the prestige and credibility of the sports writing profession. SB Nation Senior MMA editor Luke Thomas described it as the "Walmart of Journalism" and its MMA coverage "toothless amateur coverage".

Since abandoning the content farm model in 2010, Bleacher Report has been the subject of continued criticism for its exploitation of unpaid contributors, its blanket policy prohibiting writers from breaking their own news, and its high-volume production of low-quality, search-optimized slideshow content. These critiques found their strongest voice to date in an October 2012 SF Weekly article, in which tech columnist and entrepreneur Vivek Wadhwa was quoted accusing Bleacher Report of "dumbing down of the web" with "custom-manufactured garbage." In December 2012, a lampoon article in The Onion played on the same themes. In July 2014, Deadspin published a lengthy narrative written by Tom Schreier, a former Bleacher Report featured columnist. Detailing his journey from hopeful intern to "just one more drone pumping content to get clicked on," in three years, Schreier "wrote over 500 articles, generated nearly three million page views, and received $200 for [his] services."

=== Response ===
Bleacher Report attempted to address the concerns of its early critics by making substantive reforms to its editorial and personnel policies in 2010 and 2011. These reforms were aimed chiefly at the mechanics of Bleacher Report's Writer Program, with emphasis on enhancing quality and credibility by doing the following:

- Initiating a formal application process for all prospective writers, wherein only the top 20 percent of candidates earn the right to publish on the site.
- Introducing educational resources for new and veteran writers, including the "B/R U" new-media training program.
- Establishing a paid team of Lead Writers to headline the network's sport-specific writer communities.

Although some detractors likened such changes "to spritzing a little room deodorizer after leaving a steaming deposit in the toilet and failing to flush", apart from a published rebuttal disputing the objectivity and accuracy of the October 2012 SF Weekly article, Bleacher Report has mounted a substantive response to ongoing criticism of its contributor compensation structure, news-breaking policy and search-optimization strategies.

In 2013, Bleacher Report hired Mike Freeman as a columnist from CBSSports.com. The company then brought on National Basketball Association reporter Howard Beck from The New York Times. He was convinced by Bleacher Report that they were on the verge of transforming its website. In addition to Beck becoming their lead NBA writer, Bleacher Report also added Ethan Skolnick from The Palm Beach Post to report on the Miami Heat, Kevin Ding of Orange County Register to cover the Los Angeles Lakers, and Jared Zwerling from ESPN to pen NBA features.

== Accolades ==
Forbes.com called Bleacher Report "one of the leaders" among sports startups "figuring out the digital space" in August 2011, noting the company's success in "providing publishing tools to all sorts of knowledgeable sports fans to report and express what they know." Bleacher Report was also named one of Time magazine's "50 Best Websites of 2011", and was picked by Adweek readers as 2011's "Best Sports Media Brand".

In 2017, Bleacher Report was named "Hottest in Sports" in Adweek's Annual Hot List. Game of Zones has received Sports Emmy Award nominations in 2015 and 2018 and was nominated for Outstanding Digital Innovation at the 2017 Emmy Awards.

Bleacher Report has received a number of Clio Sports Awards:

2015

- Gold for "MJ All Day"

2018

- Grand for Game of Zones

- Silver for "NBA Playoff Battle Royale"

- Silver for "Up Your Game"

- Silver for Gridiron Heights
