= Eden's Outcasts =

2007 biography by John Matteson of Louisa May Alcott

- Author: John Matteson
- Language: English
- Subject: Louisa May Alcott
- Genre: Biography
- Publisher: W. W. Norton
- Publication date: 2007
- Publication place: United States

Eden's Outcasts: The Story of Louisa May Alcott and Her Father is a 2007 biography by John Matteson of Louisa May Alcott, best known as the author of Little Women, and her father, Amos Bronson Alcott, an American transcendentalist philosopher and the founder of the Fruitlands utopian community. Eden's Outcasts won the 2008 Pulitzer Prize for Biography.

Matteson, a professor of English at John Jay College of Criminal Justice in New York City, was inspired to write the book by his relationship with his real-life daughter, who, according to the book's acknowledgments, did "more than anyone else" to help him understand the Alcotts. Eden's Outcasts is noteworthy for its sympathetic treatment of Bronson, a figure who has been frequently discounted and even ridiculed by scholars of the Transcendental era, and for its suggestion that both Bronson and Louisa suffered from some form of bipolar disorder. Eden's Outcasts is only the second dual biography ever to have been awarded the Pulitzer Prize for Biography or Autobiography, the first having been Eleanor and Franklin by Joseph P. Lash.
