= Crosslink Capital =

American early-stage venture capital firm

- Type: Private
- Industry: Venture capital
- Founded: 1989; 37 years ago
- Founder: Seymour Franklin Kaufman; Michael Joseph Stark
- Headquarters: 2 Embarcadero Center Suite 2200 San Francisco, California 94111, United States
- Total assets: US$2,000,000,000
- Website: www.crosslinkcapital.com

Crosslink Capital (founded 1989) is a venture capital firm with an asset management business that continues into the public equity market for fast-growing companies. Crosslink Capital has over $3.0 billion in assets under management that it invests in consumer and enterprise businesses.

== Investments ==
Crosslink Capital prefers to partner with companies in venture capital at the earliest stages across all sectors. Crosslink invests in both private and public companies. Some of Crosslink's investments include:

- Coupa (exited)
- Bleacher Report (exited)
- Virage Logic (exited)
