= Dave Nemetz =

American businessman

- Born: 1984 (age 41–42); California, United States
- Education: University of Southern California
- Occupations: Entrepreneur, business executive
- Known for: Co-founding the sports information website the Bleacher Report

Dave Nemetz is an American entrepreneur and business executive best known for co-founding the sports information website the Bleacher Report. He also founded website Inverse in 2015, and was CEO of the company for its first years; he sold it in 2020.

== Early life and education ==
Nemetz is a native of California and is a graduate of Menlo School and the University of Southern California.

== Career ==
Nemetz co-founded Bleacher Report, Inc. in 2007 with three of his high school friends and served as the Vice President of Video and Business Development until 2012 when the company was acquired by Time Warner's Turner Sports for $170 million. He continued with the company for eight months after the acquisition and, afterward, advised and invested in other media companies such as Elite Daily and Bustle.

In 2015, he launched his second digital media venture, Inverse, which is geared toward millennial men. Nemetz started the company from seed funding with its headquarters in San Francisco, California and the editorial staff initially based in Brooklyn, New York. The headquarters has since been moved to SoHo, Manhattan, New York City.

He sold the publication to Bustle Digital Group in 2020 and left inverse in 2021.
