= Office of Global Programs =

Oversight of Climate and Global Change

The Office of Global Programs (OGP) is a division of the United States' National Oceanic and Atmospheric Administration (NOAA) run under the auspices of the Office of Oceanic and Atmospheric Research (OAR).

The purpose of the OGP is to oversee the NOAA Climate and Global Change (C&GC) Program. The OGP assists NOAA in its task of providing climate forecasts by sponsoring focused scientific research, within approximately eleven research elements, aimed at understanding climate variability and its predictability.
