= Howard Beck =

American journalist (born 1968)

- Born: July 6, 1968 (age 58); Oakland, California
- Education: University of California, Davis
- Employers: Los Angeles Daily News; New York Times; Bleacher Report; Sports Illustrated; The Ringer

Howard Beck (born July 6, 1968 in Oakland, California) is an American journalist. Beck has covered the National Basketball Association (NBA) for the Los Angeles Daily News, the New York Times, Bleacher Report and Sports Illustrated. From December 2020 until February 28, 2023, he was an NBA senior writer for Sports Illustrated, where he also co-hosted The Crossover podcast with Chris Mannix. In October of 2022, Beck wrote the introduction for Sports Illustrated "The Greatest Show on Earth - A History of the Los Angeles Lakers' Winning Tradition". On February 15, 2023 he was laid off by Sports Illustrated effective February 28, 2023. On September 18, 2023, Beck announced he was joining The Ringer.

At the Los Angeles Daily News, Beck covered the Los Angeles Lakers. With the New York Times, Beck covered the New York Knicks for most of his tenure with a brief assignment to the Brooklyn Nets during their first season in Brooklyn. In the fall of 2013 Howard left the New York Times for the Bleacher Report to be their national NBA writer. In the fall of 2020 Bleacher Report stopped publishing BR Magazine and laid off various employees including Beck.

From 2017 to 2020, Beck also created and hosted The Full 48 podcast. Guests included NBA commissioner Adam Silver, actor Kelly Aucoin, Los Angeles Lakers owner Jeanie Buss, Counting Crows lead singer Adam Duritz and others. Beck is now also a co-host on the Ringers ‘real ones’ podcast on a Monday where he, Raja Bell, and Logan Murdock discuss the current NBA.

Howard was raised in California and graduated from the University of California, Davis where he served as editor in chief for the California Aggie newspaper. He currently resides in Brooklyn, New York.
