= List of Late Night with Jimmy Fallon episodes (2011) =

- No. of episodes: 194

Release
- Original network: NBC

Season chronology
- ← Previous; 2010 episodes Next → 2012 episodes

This is the list of episodes for Late Night with Jimmy Fallon in 2011.

== 2011 ==
=== January ===
No.	Original release date	Guest(s)	Musical/entertainment guest(s)
369	January 3, 2011	Jeff Musial, Gwyneth Paltrow, Wyatt Cenac	Best Coast
Wheel of Game Shows, The Best of Shazzazz
370	January 4, 2011	Kevin Spacey, DJ Pauly D	Local Natives
Pros & Cons - The NFL Playoffs, Do Not Read List
371	January 5, 2011	Tim McGraw, Emmy Rossum	The Ghost of a Saber Tooth Tiger
Late Night Hashtags - #itsthe011son, Oregon Ducks Power Ballad, Ladder Golf - Fallon vs. McGraw
372	January 6, 2011	Jim Carrey, Dr. Oz, Ted Williams	Iron & Wine
Oregon Ducks Power Ballad, Snooki Karaoke, Jim Carrey Treadmill Interview
373	January 7, 2011	Michelle Williams, Patton Oswalt, Daniel Holzman, Michael Chernow	Tank
Thank You Notes, Pro Bowl Shuffle, Buzzwords
374	January 10, 2011	Winona Ryder, Regina King	Okkervil River
Shout Outs, What's Mine Is Yours, Total Iceholes - Fallon vs. Ryder
375	January 11, 2011	Jennifer Connelly, Jerry O'Connell	Tom Tom Club
Pros & Cons - The Golden Globes, Doll Posin'
376	January 12, 2011	Paul Giamatti, Faith Hill	Cake
Late Night Hashtags - #worstlieievertold, Velvet Elvises, Tackling Snowmen
377	January 13, 2011	Donald Trump, Bobby Moynihan	Neon Trees
Remix the Clips, The Vanilla Wombats Perform "My Upstairs Neighbors Are Having Sex (And Listening to the Black Eyed Peas)", Charades - Fallon & Lil' Jon vs. Trump & NeNe Leakes
378	January 14, 2011	Candice Bergen, Ginnifer Goodwin, Colin Jost	Fantasia Barrino
Thank You Notes, Put It in Reverse
379	January 18, 2011	Steven Tyler, Chace Crawford	Two Door Cinema Club
Pros & Cons - American Idol Season 10, Karate Pinata
380	January 19, 2011	Betty White, Stephen Merchant	Ariel Pink's Haunted Graffiti
Late Night Hashtags - #worstdate, At the Bar with Roger Federer, Password - Fallon vs. White
381	January 20, 2011	Ashton Kutcher, Fred Armisen	Dismemberment Plan
Kicking Stuff, Water War - Fallon vs. Kutcher, Musical Instruments Game - Fred Armisen vs. Carrie Brownstein
382	January 21, 2011	David Duchovny, Greta Gerwig, Tyler Florence	El DeBarge
Thank You Notes, Models and Buckets, Three Point Shootout - Fallon vs. Duchovny
383	January 31, 2011	Bill Paxton, Adam Scott	Edie Brickell
He Said She Said, Freestylin' with the Roots

=== February ===
No.	Original release date	Guest(s)	Musical/entertainment guest(s)
384	February 1, 2011	Ice Cube, Leighton Meester	Todd Rundgren
Pros & Cons - Super Bowl Parties, iPhone Apps, Snowball Throwing - Fallon vs. Ice Cube
385	February 2, 2011	Samuel L. Jackson, Larry the Cable Guy	Phantogram
Late Night Hashtags - #worstpickuplines, Battle of the Instant Dance Crews, Hallway Golf - Fallon Vs. Jackson
386	February 3, 2011	Dana Carvey, Minka Kelly	Ricky Martin
Remix the Clips, How You Like Me Now?, Yngwie Malmsteen sits in with the Roots
387	February 4, 2011	Kate Walsh, Rob Brydon	Lissie
Thank You Notes, Darts of Insanity, Tic-Tac-Toe - Fallon vs. Walsh
388	February 7, 2011	Brooke Shields, Alex Pettyfer, Gail Simmons	...And You Will Know Us by the Trail of Dead
Late Night Perm Week Day 1, Cone Collar Derby
389	February 8, 2011	Kevin Nealon, Timothy Olyphant	Little Big Town
Late Night Perm Week Day 2, Audience Suggestion Box
390	February 9, 2011	Annette Bening, Nick Swardson, Les Stroud	Cowboy Junkies
Late Night Perm Week Day 3, Late Night Hashtags - #screwvalentinesday
391	February 10, 2011	Jennifer Aniston, Piers Morgan, Chef Carla Hall	Ginuwine
Late Night Perm Week Day 4, Reflections with Justin Bieber, Charades - Fallon vs. Aniston
392	February 11, 2011	Adam Sandler, Aziz Ansari	Mike Gordon
Late Night Perm Week Day 5, Thank You Notes
393	February 14, 2011	January Jones, Mike Birbiglia	Greyson Chance
Pros & Cons - Valentine's Day, Name That Guy, Valentine's Crossbow - Fallon vs. Jones
394	February 15, 2011	Victoria Beckham, Jeff Probst, Joe Mauer	Drive-By Truckers
Do Not Read List, Kicking Stuff
395	February 16, 2011	Forest Whitaker, Brandon T. Jackson, Felicia Day	Tyler, the Creator and Hodgy Beats from Odd Future
Late Night Hashtags - #newactionmoviequotes, Dance Your Hat & Gloves Off
396	February 17, 2011	William H. Macy, Michael Showalter, Dan St. Germain	Ne-Yo
Remix the Clips, Wax On Wax Off, Musical Instrument Game - Fallon vs. Macy
397	February 18, 2011	Ann Curry, Patrice O'Neal	Raekwon featuring Ghostface Killah
Thank You Notes, Pictionary - Fallon vs. Curry
398	February 22, 2011	Jeremy Irons, Peter & Bobby Farrelly	Destroyer
Pros & Cons - The 83rd Academy Awards, What's Mine Is Yours
399	February 23, 2011	Liza Minnelli, Anthony Mackie, Joshua Topolsky	Bell Biv DeVoe
Late Night Hashtags - #mygagaentrance
400	February 24, 2011	Nicole "Snooki" Polizzi, Martin Bashir	Laurie Anderson
Real Housewives Of Late Night - Episode 8, The Vanilla Wombats - I Finally Accepted The Fact That I Wear Size 36 Jeans
401	February 25, 2011	Jason Sudeikis, Amber Heard, Chef Cyril Renaud	Charlie Wilson
Thank You Notes, If Puppies Could Vote - Oscars Edition
402	February 28, 2011	Topher Grace, Jim Gaffigan	Glasser
Shout Outs, Competitive Spit-Takes

=== March ===
No.	Original release date	Guest(s)	Musical/entertainment guest(s)
403	March 1, 2011	Universal Record Database, Isla Fisher, Josh Radnor, Dan St. Germain	Keri Hilson
Pros & Cons - Online Dating
404	March 2, 2011	Abigail Breslin, Mike Tyson	Motörhead
Slow Jam The News, Jersey Floor - Episode 1
405	March 3, 2011	Miley Cyrus, Michael Stipe	Lykke Li
Remix the Clips, Lick It for $10
406	March 4, 2011	Kathy Bates, Chris Pratt	Lupe Fiasco
Charlie Sheen Things I Said, Thank You Notes, Charades - Fallon & Bates Vs. Pratt & Fiasco
407	March 14, 2011	Tyra Banks, Holt McCallany	The Chieftains
Obama Expressions, Doll Posin'
408	March 15, 2011	Ted Danson	Kenny Rogers
Pros & Cons - St. Patrick's Day, Jimmy and Higgins visit the Houston Livestock Show and Rodeo
409	March 16, 2011	Amy Poehler, Tiger Woods	Fabolous
LIU Coach Jim Ferry Tribute, Late Night Hashtags - #drunkestievergot
410	March 17, 2011	Howard Stern, Penn & Teller	Leon Russell
Cell Phone Shootout, Bob Dylan - "Charles in Charge"
411	March 18, 2011	Robert De Niro & Bradley Cooper, Pauley Perrette	Chef Marcel Vigneron
Thank You Notes, Password
412	March 21, 2011	Kiefer Sutherland, Emily Browning	Little Dragon
Hot Dog in a Hole: Republican Front Runner Edition, Audience Suggestion Box
413	March 22, 2011	Brian Williams, Dwight Howard	Richard Ashcroft
Pros & Cons - Spring Break, Wheel of Carpet Samples
414	March 23, 2011	Trey Parker & Matt Stone, Geoffrey Canada	Friendly Fires
Late Night Hashtags - #thatwasawkward, Steel Network Sports Freak-out!
415	March 24, 2011	Rachel Maddow, Colin Quinn	Tres MTS.
Do Not Read List, Silent Library
416	March 25, 2011	Billy Crudup, Martha Plimpton, Reggie Fils-Aimé	Cut Copy
Thank You Notes, Put It in Reverse
417	March 28, 2011	Jeff Musial, David Schwimmer, Brock Lesnar	Vanilla Fudge
Fallon/Colbert Project
418	March 29, 2011	Liv Tyler, Jerry Weintraub	Copyright Criminals All Star Band
Fallon/Colbert Project, Pros & Cons - Playing Basketball for VCU, Battle of the Instant Dance Crews
419	March 30, 2011	Russell Brand, Gayle King	The Strokes
Fallon/Colbert Project, Casey Abrams Product Endorsements, Models & Buckets
420	March 31, 2011	Elton John, James Marsden	Duran Duran
Fallon/Colbert Project, Late Night Hashtags - #bestprankever, Name That Guy

=== April ===
No.	Original release date	Guest(s)	Musical/entertainment guest(s)
421	April 1, 2011	Earvin "Magic" Johnson, The Lonely Island	Joey Kola
Thank You Notes, Fallon/Colbert Project
422	April 4, 2011	James Franco, Maria Menounos	Booker T. Jones
He Said She Said, Competitive Spit-Takes, Audience Skeeball - Fallon vs. Franco
423	April 5, 2011	Keanu Reeves, Lorraine Nicholson	Wire
Pros & Cons - Charlie Sheen's "My Violent Torpedo of Truth" Tour, Dance Avenue, Pretty Boys
424	April 6, 2011	Jennifer Garner, Donald Glover	Paul Simon
Late Night Hashtags - #worstspringbreak, Stomp/Paul Simon Performance, Beer Pong - Fallon vs. Garner
425	April 7, 2011	Helen Mirren, Damon Wayans Jr.	Paul Simon
Real Housewives of Late Night - Episode 9, How You Like Me Now?
426	April 8, 2011	Uma Thurman, Anthony Anderson	Marcus Samuelsson
Thank You Notes, iPhone Apps
427	April 25, 2011	Daniel Radcliffe, Aly Michalka	Darius Rucker
Freestylin' with the Roots, Do Not Read List
428	April 26, 2011	Matt Lauer, Miranda Cosgrove, Andy Cohen	Twisted Sister
Pros & Cons - A Donald Trump Presidency, Meat Loaf and Jimmy sing about Bagel Bites
429	April 27, 2011	Seth Meyers, Elvis Duran	Dispatch
Late Night Hashtags - #dontjudgeme, Karate Pinata, Sibling Game - Meyers Brothers
430	April 28, 2011	Ice-T, Paula Patton	Tim McGraw
Shout Outs, Donald Trump Fireside Chat
431	April 29, 2011	Eva Mendes	Aretha Franklin
Thank You Notes, Darts of Insanity, Dancing with the Stars - Fallon & Mendes

=== May ===
No.	Original release date	Guest(s)	Musical/entertainment guest(s)
432	May 2, 2011	LL Cool J, Judd Apatow	Ambrosia
Donald Trump Message, Shared Experience, Yacht Rock Competitive Spit Takes
433	May 3, 2011	Whoopi Goldberg, Jennifer Hudson, Elmo	Jennifer Hudson
Pros & Cons - Mother's Day
434	May 4, 2011	Alec Baldwin, Maggie Q	Louis Katz
Late Night Hashtags - #mymomisnuts, Jacob's Patience
435	May 5, 2011	Tina Fey, Tom Welling	Twin Shadow
Jersey Floor - Episode 2, Password - Fallon vs. Fey
436	May 6, 2011	Edie Falco, Carmelo Anthony, Michael Symon	Lloyd Banks
Thank You Notes, Kentucky Derby Rap, Three-Point Shootout - Fallon vs. Anthony
437	May 9, 2011	Chelsea Handler, Josh Gad, Ziggy Marley	N/A
Obama Expressions, Doll Posin'
438	May 10, 2011	Keira Knightley, John McEnroe	Chris Cornell
Pros & Cons - College Graduation, Battle of the Instant Dance Crews, Beer Pong - Fallon vs. McEnroe
439	May 11, 2011	Keith Richards, Paul Bettany	Jennifer Hudson, Jakob Dylan
Late Night Hashtags - #promdisaster
440	May 12, 2011	Maya Rudolph, Nick Offerman	Lauryn Hill
Letters Home, Let Us Play with Your Look
441	May 13, 2011	Kristen Wiig, Chris Colfer	Lenny Kravitz
Thank You Notes, Audience Suggestion Box
442	May 16, 2011	Howie Mandel, Cee Lo Green	Randy Newman
He Said She Said, Ambiguously Gay Duo (SNL 5/14/11)
443	May 17, 2011	Randy Jackson, Mario Batali	Death Cab for Cutie, Robert Randolph
Pros & Cons - Senior Prom, Wax On Wax Off
444	May 18, 2011	Jim Parsons, Mireille Enos	The Head & the Heart
Late Night Hashtags - #worstgiftever, Put It in Reverse, Pictionary - Fallon vs. Parsons
445	May 19, 2011	Ellen Barkin, Chris Hardwick, Michael Schlow	Kelly Rowland
Sheen'd, Charades - Fallon vs. Barkin
446	May 20, 2011	Jim Belushi, Jennifer Lawrence	Fleet Foxes
Thank You Notes, John Rich - "You're Fired"
447	May 23, 2011	Queen Latifah, Matt Bomer	Bon Iver
How You Like Me Now, Bike Race - Fallon vs. Latifah
448	May 24, 2011	Ed Helms, Andrew Rannells	The Cars
Pros & Cons - Oprah's Last Show, Freestyling with the Roots, Long Pour - Fallon vs. Helms
449	May 25, 2011	Lucy Liu, Justin Tuck, Wavy Gravy	David Crosby, Graham Nash
Late Night Hashtags - #iwentthere, Bob Dylan, David Crosby, & Graham Nash - "Party in the USA", Speed Pool - Fallon Vs. Tuck
450	May 26, 2011	James McAvoy, Gilbert Gottfried	Amos Lee
Oprah Letters, My Kids Are Weird
451	May 27, 2011	John Rich, Stone Cold Steve Austin, Marcela Valladolid	N/A
Thank You Notes, Models & Buckets, Audience Skee-Ball - Fallon vs. Rich

=== June ===
No.	Original release date	Guest(s)	Musical/entertainment guest(s)
452	June 6, 2011	Kathie Lee Gifford, Jason Earles	Mogwai
Fallon/Colbert Emmy Nomination Feud, Dance Your Hat & Gloves Off, Beer/Wine Pong - Fallon vs. Gifford
453	June 7, 2011	Larry King, Kourtney Kardashian, Khloé Kardashian Odom	My Morning Jacket
Weiner Apology, Pros & Cons - Sarah Palin Bus Tour, Larry King LIVE Phone Call Questions
454	June 8, 2011	Jeff Musial, Glenn Close, Zoe Kravitz	Joe Jackson
Late Night Hashtags - #mypetisweird, Sumo Wrestling - Fallon vs. Close
455	June 9, 2011	Kirstie Alley, Jessica Chastain	Robbie Robertson
Do Not Read Beach Edition, Sports Freak Out, Total Iceholes - Fallon vs. Alley
456	June 10, 2011	Jason Lee, Emma Roberts	Julian McCullough
Thank You Notes, Shout Outs
457	June 13, 2011	Jada Pinkett Smith, Simon Pegg, Modern Warfare 3	Givers
Celebrity Whispers, Cell Phone Shootout, Modern Warfare 3 Demo
458	June 14, 2011	Betty White, Jeff Gordon, Gears of War 3	Lauryn Hill
Pros & Cons - Father's Day, Password - Fallon vs. White, Gears of War 3 Demo
459	June 15, 2011	Cory Monteith, Larry the Cable Guy, Uncharted 3	Paul Williams
Late Night Hashtags - #thatsmydad, Battle of the Instant Bands, Uncharted 3 Demo
460	June 16, 2011	Keith Olbermann, Rosie Huntington-Whiteley, Battlefield 3	Battles
The Ballad of Anthony Weiner, Velvet Elvises, Battlefield 3 Demo
461	June 17, 2011	John C. Reilly, Noah Wyle, Reggie Fils-Aimé	Billy Currington
Thank You Notes, Competitive Spit-Takes, The Legend of Zelda: Skyward Sword Demo
462	June 20, 2011	Morgan Freeman, Thomas Lennon, Kemba Walker	Mint Condition
Cupid's Arrow, Name That Guy, Three-Point Shootout - Fallon vs. Walker, "Weird Al" Yankovic sits in with the Roots
463	June 21, 2011	Cameron Diaz, Charlie Day	Bon Iver, Big Sean
Pros & Cons - Obama's Weekend "Golf Summit", Other Voices, Long Pour - Fallon vs. Day
464	June 22, 2011	Elijah Wood, Michael Rapaport	Bob Mould
Late Night Hashtags - #worstsummervacation, Audience Suggestion Box, Stump - Fallon vs. Wood
465	June 23, 2011	Selena Gomez, Jon Benjamin	N/A
Jackie Neptune & the Planetariums, Karate Pinata, Shoe Golf - Fallon vs. Gomez
466	June 24, 2011	Bob Costas, Raven-Symoné	Archers of Loaf
Justin Bieber's Someday Commercial, Thank You Notes

=== July ===
No.	Original release date	Guest(s)	Musical/entertainment guest(s)
467	July 11, 2011	Kid Rock, Emily Rose	Panda Bear
Obama Expressions, Freestylin' with the Roots, Horseshoes - Fallon vs. Rock
468	July 12, 2011	Seth Green, Chris Evans	Eric Bromberg, Bruce Bromberg
Pros & Cons - The Last Harry Potter Movie, Models & Buckets, Beer Pong - Fallon vs. Evans
469	July 13, 2011	Gabourey Sidibe, Blake Shelton	Joe Jonas
Celebrity Whispers, Late Night Hashtags - #beachfail, Pictionary - Fallon vs. Sidibe
470	July 14, 2011	Bob Saget, Neil deGrasse Tyson	James Blake
Cupid's Arrow, Doll Posin'
471	July 15, 2011	Marisa Tomei	Billy Ray Cyrus
Thank You Notes, Wheel of Game Shows, Total Iceholes - Fallon vs. Tomei
472	July 18, 2011	Mila Kunis, Joshua Topolsky	Wye Oak
Herman Cain Album Advertisement, Put It in Reverse, Ladder Golf - Fallon vs. Kunis
473	July 19, 2011	Justin Timberlake, Rose Byrne	Emmylou Harris
"The Dark Knight Rises" Trailer, Pros & Cons - Pool Parties, History of Rap 2
474	July 20, 2011	Ryan Gosling, Andy Cohen	Joseph Arthur
Late Night Hashtags - #SoEmbarrassing, Do Not Read List
475	July 21, 2011	Jeff Musial, Brooke Shields	Ziggy Marley
iPhone Apps
476	July 22, 2011	Kevin Connolly, Brit Marling	Matt Kirshen
Thank You Notes, Darts of Insanity, Box Hockey - Fallon vs. Connolly
477	July 25, 2011	Don Cheadle, The Amazing Kreskin	Ray Davies
Father & Son, Jacob's Patience
478	July 26, 2011	Steve Carell, Marc Maron	Matt & Kim
Pros & Cons - Obama Turning 50, Steel Network Sports Freak-out!, Other Voices
479	July 27, 2011	Neil Patrick Harris, Fran Lebowitz	They Might Be Giants
Late Night Hashtags - #mybossisweird, Water War - Fallon vs. Kattan, Charades - Fallon & Harris vs. Higgins & Kattan
480	July 28, 2011	Julianne Moore, Dominic Cooper	Beyoncé
Cupid's Arrow, Musical Instruments - Fallon vs. Moore
481	July 29, 2011	Brian Williams, Rashad Evans	Big Sean
Slow Jam the News, Thank You Notes, Shout Outs

=== August ===
No.	Original release date	Guest(s)	Musical/entertainment guest(s)
482	August 1, 2011	Cory Monteith, Lou Dobbs	Tune-Yards
Shark Facts, Animal Thoughts, Competitive Spit-Takes, Jelly Donut Shootout - Fallon vs. Monteith
483	August 2, 2011	Danny McBride, Dianna Agron	The Sheepdogs
Shark Facts, Pros & Cons - Jersey Shore In Italy, Wheel of Carpet Samples
484	August 3, 2011	Jason Bateman, Freida Pinto, Tony Bennett	Big Audio Dynamite
Jimmy Wishes Tony Bennett a Happy Birthday, Shark Facts, Late Night Hashtags - #campingfail, Teen Wolf Too Scene Revisited
485	August 4, 2011	Ryan Reynolds, Viola Davis	Fountains of Wayne
Shark Facts, Jersey Shore Shared Experiences, Jersey Shore Bottled Water, Pearls of Wisdom with Goat Leg Greg
486	August 5, 2011	Horatio Sanz, Triple H	Voca People
Shark Facts, Thank You Notes, Drawer Full of Memories
487	August 8, 2011	Rudy Giuliani, Adam Ferrara	My Chemical Romance
Celebrity Whispers, Wax On Wax Off, Green Machine Race - Fallon vs. Ferrara
488	August 9, 2011	Katie Holmes, Joe Bastianich	The Kills, Gary Clark Jr.
Pros & Cons - Congress on Vacation, Models & Buckets, Pictionary - Fallon vs. Holmes
489	August 10, 2011	Nicole "Snooki" Polizzi, Joe Buck	Tig Notaro
Late Night Hashtags - #whodoesthat, Audience Suggestion Box, Shoe Golf - Fallon vs. Polizzi
490	August 11, 2011	Emma Stone, Stephen Moyer	Fabio Viviani
Late Night E-Cards, Dance Challenge 2 Contest Announcement, Ew!
491	August 12, 2011	Julia Stiles, Jennifer Farley	Tame Impala
Thank You Notes, Jose the Correspondent (segment filmed prior to episode's taping), Charades - Fallon & Farley vs. Stiles & Black Thought
492	August 29, 2011	Robert Duvall, Emmanuelle Chriqui	The Cars
Freestyling with the Roots, Do Not Read List
493	August 30, 2011	Will Forte, Amy Sedaris	Stephen Malkmus, The Jicks
Pros & Cons - Labor Day Weekend
494	August 31, 2011	Jeff Musial, Christina Ricci, Jim Gaffigan	Kirk Franklin
Late Night Hashtags - #dadquotes, Total Iceholes - Fallon vs. Ricci

=== September ===
No.	Original release date	Guest(s)	Musical/entertainment guest(s)
495	September 1, 2011	Al Roker, Wayde King, Brett Raymer	Lenny Kravitz
Cupid's Arrow, Karate Pinata, Pictionary - Fallon vs. Roker
496	September 2, 2011	Jason Sudeikis, Deena Nicole Cortese	Jon Rineman
Thank You Notes, Mets Bucket Hat Guy, Bow & Arrow Darts - Fallon vs. Sudeikis
497	September 6, 2011	Denis Leary, Olivia Munn	The Antlers
Pros & Cons - Return to College, Chicken Wing Eating Contest, Box Hockey - Fallon vs. Leary
498	September 7, 2011	Marion Cotillard, Nick Swardson, David Neville, Marcus Wainwright	Anthrax
Late Night Hashtags - #whyimsingle, 2011 NFL Puppy Predictors, Squeef Brothers
499	September 8, 2011	Tom Selleck, Cameron Crowe	Pearl Jam
2011 NFL Puppy Predictors, "Balls in Your Mouth" Ballad with Eddie Vedder
500	September 9, 2011	Lauren Graham, Joel Edgerton	Pearl Jam
Thank You Notes, 2011 NFL Puppy Predictors, At the Bar with Roger Federer, Charades - Fallon vs. Graham
501	September 12, 2011	Sarah Michelle Gellar, Alexander Skarsgard	The Zombies
2011 NFL Puppy Predictors, Letters Home, Taboo - Fallon vs. Gellar
502	September 13, 2011	Will Arnett, Richard Branson	Girls
Pros & Cons - New Season of Dancing with the Stars, 2011 NFL Puppy Predictors Super Bowl Winners, Space Train. Also a special appearance by the 2011 US Open winner Novak Djokovic.
503	September 14, 2011	Greg Kinnear, Bear Grylls	Neon Indian
Late Night Hashtags - #myteacherisweird, Name That Guy, Machete Ping Pong - Fallon vs. Grylls
504	September 15, 2011	Zooey Deschanel, Jason "Mayhem" Miller	Jean-Georges Vongerichten
He Said She Said, Put It on a Cracker, Musical Instrument Game - Fallon vs. Deschanel
505	September 16, 2011	Kate Bosworth, Paul Wesley	Nick Turner
Thank You Notes, Fallon & Colbert's Friendship, Beer Pong - Fallon vs. Bosworth
506	September 20, 2011	Dana Carvey, Demi Lovato	Clap Your Hands Say Yeah
Charlie Sheen Roasting, Dance Your Hat & Gloves Off, Tumbleweed Canyon
507	September 21, 2011	Jonah Hill, Whitney Cummings	Elbow
Late Night Hashtags - #akwarddate, Jersey Floor - Episode 3
508	September 22, 2011	Julianna Margulies, Wyatt Cenac	Telekinesis
Celebrity Whispers, Darts of Insanity, Speed Celebrity - Fallon vs. Margulies
509	September 23, 2011	Taylor Lautner, Florence Henderson	Giada De Laurentiis
Thank You Notes
510	September 26, 2011	Andy Samberg, Elmo, Nick Mason	the Shins
Jonah Hill/Matthew Morrison Feud, Models & Buckets
511	September 27, 2011	Joseph Gordon-Levitt, Roger Waters	Foo Fighters
Pros & Cons - New Changes to Facebook, iPhone Apps, Late Night Karaoke
512	September 28, 2011	Anna Faris, Michael Emerson, Dwyane Wade	MGMT
Late Night Hashtags - #partyfail, Put It in Reverse, Three Point Shootout - Fallon vs. Wade
513	September 29, 2011	Melissa McCarthy, Steven Ward, JoAnn Ward	Dierks Bentley
Audience Suggestion Box, Girl Talk Jenga - Fallon vs. McCarthy
514	September 30, 2011	Jeff Musial, Claire Danes, Rev. Al Sharpton	Pearl Jam
Thank You Notes, Ew!

=== October ===
No.	Original release date	Guest(s)	Musical/entertainment guest(s)
515	October 3, 2011	Kathy Bates, Paul Scheer, Sean Parker	Radiohead
Andy Rooney Retirement, Doll Posin'
516	October 4, 2011	Simon Cowell, Laura Dern, Ben Cohen, Jerry Greenfield	Bobby Flay
Other Voices
517	October 5, 2011	Shaquille O'Neal, Evan Rachel Wood	Portishead
Late Night Hashtags - #myroommateiscrazy, NBA Jam Challenge - Fallon vs. O'Neal, Special appearance by former Late Night host Conan O'Brien.
518	October 6, 2011	Hugh Jackman, Rachel Bilson	JEFF the Brotherhood
Do Not Read List, Water War - Fallon vs. Jackman
519	October 7, 2011	Paul Giamatti, Alison Brie	Judas Priest
Thank You Notes, Cell Phone Shootout
520	October 10, 2011	Ice-T, Rich Fulcher	Yo Gabba Gabba!
Obama Expressions!, Pictionary - Fallon & Higgins Vs. Ice-T & Coco
521	October 11, 2011	Samuel L. Jackson, Dylan McDermott	Ra Ra Riot
Pros & Cons - GOP Debate, Shout Outs, Home Run Derby - Fallon Vs. Jackson
522	October 12, 2011	Alan Cumming, Michael Phelps	Chavez
Late Night Hashtags - #yeahididthat, GOP Political Ads, Push The Limit Challenge - Fallon Vs. Phelps
523	October 13, 2011	Cedric the Entertainer, Julianne Hough, Joshua Topolsky	The Moody Blues
Animal Thoughts, Ready Set Flow
524	October 14, 2011	Matthew Broderick, Michael "The Situation" Sorrentino, Bryan Voltaggio, Michael Voltaggio	Monica
Thank You Notes, Jacob's Patience, Demo of Batman: Arkham City
525	October 24, 2011	Naomi Watts, Brian Grazer	Beirut
Late Night E-Cards, Freestyling With The Roots
526	October 25, 2011	Jeff Musial, Abigail Breslin, Jimmie Johnson	Blitzen Trapper
Pros & Cons - Trick Or Treating, Musical Instrument Game - Fallon Vs. Breslin
527	October 26, 2011	Salma Hayek, Elizabeth Olsen	Cyndi Lauper
Late Night Hashtags - #halloweenfail, Wax On Wax Off, Beer Pong - Fallon Vs. Hayek
528	October 27, 2011	Eva Longoria, Kal Penn	Gwar
Slow Jam The News, Velvet Elvises, Speed Celebrity - Fallon Vs. Longoria
529	October 28, 2011	Justin Timberlake, Michael Peña	Kelly Clarkson
Thank You Notes, History Of Rap 3
530	October 31, 2011	Heidi Klum, Bill Burr	Lindsey Buckingham
Celebrity Whispers, Wheel Of Carpet Samples, Pumpkin Bowling - Fallon Vs. Klum

=== November ===
No.	Original release date	Guest(s)	Musical/entertainment guest(s)
531	November 1, 2011	Tracy Morgan, Mario Batali	Pablo Francisco
Pros & Cons - NYC's First Casino, Won't You Pop My Balloon
532	November 2, 2011	Billy Bob Thornton, Taraji P. Henson	Dave Stewart
Robot Voice, Justin Bieber Performs '(It's Not My) Baby', Shoe Golf - Fallon Vs. P. Henson
533	November 3, 2011	Kirsten Dunst, Chris Hardwick	Air Supply
Cupid's Arrow, Sing It Like You Mean It, Catchphrase - Fallon Vs. Dunst
534	November 4, 2011	Eddie Murphy, Drew Carey	Childish Gambino
Thank You Notes, Other Voices
535	November 7, 2011	Anderson Cooper, Armie Hammer	St. Vincent
He Said She Said, Competitive Spit-Takes, Brainstorm
536	November 8, 2011	Michael Moore, Josh Charles	Chromeo
Pros & Cons - Being An NBA Player During Lockout, Barking Points, Football Poker - Fallon Vs. Charles
537	November 9, 2011	Kathy Griffin, Dominic Cooper, David Chang	Keith Sweat
Late Night Hashtags - #mycrazyfamily, Audience Suggestion Box, Pictionary - Fallon Vs. Griffin
538	November 10, 2011	Robert Pattinson, Mike White, Reggie Fils-Aimé	Hunter Hayes
GOP Presidential Ads, Bow & Arrow Darts - Fallon Vs. Pattinson, Legend Of Zelda: Skyward Sword Demo
539	November 11, 2011	Adam Sandler, Chris Martin	Johnny Gill
Thank You Notes, The Doors "Reading Rainbow"
540	November 14, 2011	Jane Lynch, Ron Howard	Béla Fleck and the Flecktones
Americone Dream Contest, Name That Guy, Pan Pong - Fallon Vs. Lynch
541	November 15, 2011	Ben Kingsley, Felicity Jones	Tony Bennett
Pros & Cons - Green Week At NBC, Ready Set Flow
542	November 16, 2011	Martin Short, Kermit & Miss Piggy, Michael Stipe	N/A
Late Night Hashtags - #newthanksgivingsongs, Password - Short & Miss Piggy Vs. Stipe & Kermit
543	November 17, 2011	Bill Maher, Ashley Greene	Dierks Bentley
Jimmy's Favorite Commercials, Do Not Read List
544	November 18, 2011	Michelle Williams, Alton Brown	Iliza Shlesinger
Thank You Notes, Models & Buckets
545	November 21, 2011	Jason Segel, Michele Bachmann, Deepak Chopra	M83
Cupid's Arrow
546	November 22, 2011	Howie Mandel, Chloë Grace Moretz	B.o.B
Pros & Cons - Thanksgiving, Shout Outs, Total Iceholes - Fallon Vs. Moretz
547	November 23, 2011	Jason Schwartzman, Sandra Lee	Rodney Atkins
Thank You Notes, Head Swap, The Turkey Stuffing Song
548	November 28, 2011	Betty White, Jack Huston, Kevin Rose, Alex Albrecht	Jimmy Cliff
Freestyling With The Roots, Password - Fallon Vs. White
549	November 29, 2011	Jesse Eisenberg, Piper Perabo	The Dodos, Neko Case
Herman Cain Press Conference, Ultimate Mustache Fighter 9 - Cain Vs. Super Mario, Catchphrase - Fallon Vs. Eisenberg
550	November 30, 2011	Jeremy Piven, T.I., Andy Cohen	Hot Chelle Rae
Pros & Cons - Holiday Shopping, Karate Pinata

=== December ===
No.	Original release date	Guest(s)	Musical/entertainment guest(s)
551	December 1, 2011	Steve Buscemi, Darrell Hammond, Margot Robbie	Dum Dum Girls
Late Night Hashtags - #newholidaysongs, 12 Days Of Christmas Sweaters Day 12
552	December 2, 2011	Maya Rudolph, Damian Lewis, Richard Blais	Tyrese
Thank You Notes, 12 Days Of Christmas Sweaters Day 11, Christmas Song with Maya Rudolph
553	December 5, 2011	Steve Martin, Emily VanCamp	Snoop Dogg and Wiz Khalifa
Jimmy Beatboxes With The Roots, Obama Expressions, 12 Days Of Christmas Sweaters Day 10
554	December 6, 2011	Sarah Jessica Parker, Patton Oswalt, Willow Smith	The Roots
Pros & Cons - Christmas Specials, 12 Days Of Christmas Sweaters Day 9
555	December 7, 2011	Zac Efron, Method Man	Coldplay
Letters To Santa, 12 Days Of Christmas Sweaters Day 8, Three-Point Shootout - Fallon Vs. Efron
556	December 8, 2011	Ralph Fiennes, Shailene Woodley	Gym Class Heroes featuring Neon Hitch
Late Night Hashtags - #worstxmasgift, 12 Days Of Christmas Sweaters Day 7, 12 Daze of Christmas, Pictionary - Fallon Vs. Fiennes
557	December 9, 2011	Charlize Theron, Aretha Franklin, Sheamus	Aretha Franklin
Thank You Notes, 12 Days Of Christmas Sweaters Day 6, Brainstorm
558	December 19, 2011	Jeremy Renner, Rooney Mara, Michael Lindsay-Hogg	Carole King
12 Days Of Christmas Sweaters Day 5, Late Night Stocking Stuffers, Put It On A Cracker
559	December 20, 2011	Tom Cruise, Joshua Topolsky	Rufus Wainwright
Pros & Cons - Throwing A Holiday Party, 12 Days Of Christmas Sweaters Day 4, Late Night Stocking Stuffers, Audience Suggestion Box, Wreath Toss - Fallon Vs. Cruise
560	December 21, 2011	Louis C.K., Paula Patton	Aretha Franklin
12 Days Of Christmas Sweaters Day 3, Late Night Stocking Stuffers, Late Night Topical Carolers, Beer Pong - Fallon Vs. Patton
561	December 22, 2011	Jeff Musial, Jerry O'Connell, David Alan Grier	The Rockettes
'Twas The Night Before Christmas Mad Lib, 12 Days Of Christmas Sweaters Day 2, Late Night Stocking Stuffers, Shuffleboard - Fallon Vs. O'Connell
562	December 23, 2011	Seth Meyers, Kim Wayans	The Muppets
Thank You Notes, 12 Days Of Christmas Sweaters Day 1, Late Night Stocking Stuffers, Sibling Game - Meyers Brothers
