= Beginning to See the Light (book) =

Essay collection

- First edition cover
- Editor: Ellen Willis
- Language: English
- Genre: Essays, criticism
- Publisher: Knopf, Wesleyan University Press; University of Minnesota Press
- Publication date: 1981, 1992, 2012
- Publication place: United States

Beginning to See the Light is an essay collection by critic Ellen Willis.

Originally published by Knopf in 1981 as Beginning to See the Light: Pieces of a Decade, it was subsequently republished in two more editions (Wesleyan University Press in 1992 and University of Minnesota Press in 2012) as Beginning to See the Light: Sex, Hope, and Rock-and-Roll. The book collects essays Willis wrote between 1967 and 1980. In Tablet, Emily Gould particularly praises the essay "Next Year in Jerusalem" for displaying Willis's "ability, rare among even the most brilliant writers, to consider frightening ideas thoroughly and to hold contradictory ideas in her mind simultaneously, without prejudice or fear."
