= List of Late Night with Jimmy Fallon episodes (2009) =

- No. of episodes: 172

Release
- Original network: NBC

Season chronology
- ← Previous Next → 2010 episodes

This is the list of episodes for Late Night with Jimmy Fallon in 2009.

== 2009 ==
=== March ===
| No. | Original release date | Guest(s) | Musical/entertainment guest(s) |
|---|---|---|---|
| 1 | March 2, 2009 | Robert De Niro, Justin Timberlake, Nick Carter | Van Morrison ("Sweet Thing") |
Cold opening with Conan O'Brien, Slow Jam the News, Target Demographics: Blonde Mothers from Connecticut, Lick It for Ten, Space Train - Robert De Niro
| 2 | March 3, 2009 | Tina Fey, Jon Bon Jovi | Santigold ("Shove It") |
Facebook Status Updates, Jimmy & Mayor Bloomberg at 108, Rejected Chair, IVOD
| 3 | March 4, 2009 | Cameron Diaz, Billy Crudup | Clap Your Hands Say Yeah ("Statues") |
Bromance Novels, Save The Bankers, Beef Solvers, Jimmy and Cameron Dance-Off
| 4 | March 5, 2009 | Donald Trump, Serena Williams | Ludacris ("Last of a Dying Breed"/"I Do It for Hip-Hop") |
Flashback, Trump-Trump's Putt-Putt, President of the Audience, Beer Pong: Jimmy vs. Serena
| 5 | March 6, 2009 | Drew Barrymore, Chace Crawford | Mario Batali |
Who Cares Hindenburg, 7th Floor West - Episode 1, Lick It for Ten Celebrity Edition: Drew Barrymore
| 6 | March 9, 2009 | Amanda Peet, Rose Byrne | Joshua Topolsky |
Magazine Mash-Up, Amanda Atmosphere, Gadsden Purchase Guy, Gadget Demo
| 7 | March 10, 2009 | Emily Blunt, Michael Stipe | Pussycat Dolls ("Jai Ho") |
Wozniak Dancers, Wheel of Carpet Samples, Man on the Street
| 8 | March 11, 2009 | Russell Brand, Kevin Rose & Alex Albrecht | The Virgins ("One Week of Danger") |
Bernie's Bucket List, Demon PA, Letters Home, Diggnation Twitter Stunt
| 9 | March 12, 2009 | Brian Williams, Malin Åkerman | Glen Hansard ("Hairshirt") |
Jimmy Cam, Roots and The Audience, Scumbag Animals, Briant Brinkman Interview
| 10 | March 13, 2009 | Tracy Morgan, Jarod Miller | Trace Adkins ("Marry for Money") |
Shared Experiences, Basketball Overtime
| 11 | March 16, 2009 | Gary Sinise, Colin Hanks | Public Enemy ("Bring the Noise") |
Chattanooga Tournament, Spoiler Alert, Audience Member Interview
| 12 | March 17, 2009 | Bill Paxton, Kim, Kourtney & Khloe Kardashian | The Ting Tings ("That's Not My Name") |
Go Chattanooga Go, Guinness Brewmaster with Kegerator, Jimmy at the Bar
| 13 | March 18, 2009 | Clive Owen, Paul Teutul Sr. | Vampire Weekend ("White Sky") |
Chattanooga Skype and Pep Rally, Grad Students Spring Break
| 14 | March 19, 2009 | Jaime Pressly, Steve Ward | Eric Church ("It Ain't Killed Me Yet") |
Slow Jam the News, 7th Floor West - Episode 2, Chattanooga Results
| 15 | March 20, 2009 | Jason Segel, The Amazing Kreskin | Universal Record Database |
iPhone Apps, Chattanooga Wrap-Up, Statler & Waldorf (Muppets), Universal Record Attempts, Jimmy's Record Attempt
| 16 | March 23, 2009 | Regis Philbin, Kat Von D, Jon Glaser | Morrissey ("Black Cloud") |
Let's Get Quizzical, Target Demographics: Jersey Shore D-Bags
| 17 | March 24, 2009 | Rachel Maddow, John Cena, Anthony Jeselnik | Gabriella Cilmi ("Sweet About Me") |
iPod Playlists, Who Cares Hindenburg, "John Cena's Newest Movies", Rachel Maddow mixes a drink
| 18 | March 25, 2009 | Mike Myers, Anna Kournikova | The All-American Rejects ("Gives You Hell") |
Obama Look Counter, Local Markets, Rand Vendor, Beer Pong: Jimmy vs. Anna
| 19 | March 26, 2009 | Ray Liotta, Cheryl Hines | John Rich ("Shuttin' Detroit Down") |
Putin Photoshop, Redneck Tech, Jimmy's Bully
| 20 | March 27, 2009 | Ted Danson, Fred Armisen | N.E.R.D ("Soldier") |
MeowMe Ink, Saved by the Bell, Beef Solvers
| 21 | March 30, 2009 | Bill Hader, Emma Roberts | Glasvegas ("Geraldine") |
GM Basketball Rejection, Osboune Identity, Lick It for Ten
| 22 | March 31, 2009 | Glenn Close, Kristen Wiig | Gomez ("Airstream Driver") |
Facebook Status, Roots Audience Songs Vol.2

=== April ===
| No. | Original release date | Guest(s) | Musical/entertainment guest(s) |
|---|---|---|---|
| 23 | April 1, 2009 | Noah Wyle, Stevie Nicks | Nick Thune |
Volcano Sacrifice, The Lingerer
| 24 | April 2, 2009 | Seth Rogen, Leighton Meester | Dr. Dog ("The Ark") |
Shared Experiences, People Impressions, Turbo Tax (Live Commercial)
| 25 | April 3, 2009 | Lauren Graham, Judah Friedlander | Cold War Kids ("Relief") |
Cirque du Soleil, Noncompetitive Eaters, Saved By The Bell Reunion Update
| 26 | April 13, 2009 | Denis Leary, Jill Hennessy | Sara Watkins & John Paul Jones ("Long Hot Summer Days") |
Questionable Tax Write-Offs, Pie Sniffer, Air Hockey: Jimmy vs. Denis Leary
| 27 | April 14, 2009 | Tom Brokaw, Tim Heidecker & Eric Wareheim | Akon ("Be With You") |
7th Floor West - Episode 3, Cell Phone Shootout
| 28 | April 15, 2009 | Ice-T, Elmo, Morgan Webb | Yeah Yeah Yeahs ("Heads Will Roll") |
Letters Home
| 29 | April 16, 2009 | Rachel McAdams, Michael Emerson, Matthew Stafford | Solange ("T.O.N.Y.") |
Slow Jam the News: North Korea, Alien Domestic Dispute, Michael Emerson reads Little Boy Blue
| 30 | April 17, 2009 | Matthew Perry, Adam Goldberg | Plain White T's ("1, 2, 3, 4") |
Susan Boyle Reaction, President of the Audience
| 31 | April 20, 2009 | Terrence Howard, Rashida Jones | Rick Ross ("Magnificent") |
Obama Facial Expressions, Ref Fan
| 32 | April 21, 2009 | Jerry O'Connell, Thomas Lennon | Chester French ("She Loves Everybody") |
Target Demographic: Indian Doctors, Lick It For Ten
| 33 | April 22, 2009 | Seth Meyers, Michelle Trachtenberg | Mike Spinner |
Earth Day Murders, Freestylin' With The Roots, Seth and Josh Meyers "Brother Trivia", BMX Bike Tricks
| 34 | April 23, 2009 | Ali Larter, Anthony Anderson | Tinted Windows ("Kind of A Girl") |
Local Market Promos, Beef Solvers
| 35 | April 24, 2009 | Neil Patrick Harris, Emily Deschanel, Larry Fitzgerald | Reggie Watts |
Saved by the Bell Reunion Update, Operation Game

=== May ===
| No. | Original release date | Guest(s) | Musical/entertainment guest(s) |
|---|---|---|---|
| 36 | May 4, 2009 | Jennifer Aniston, Donald Faison | Adele ("Hometown Glory") |
Bad Calenders, Cell Phone Shootout, Grapefruit Bowling
| 37 | May 5, 2009 | J. J. Abrams, Colin Quinn | Sharon Jones & The Dap-Kings ("I'm Not Gonna Cry") |
Bobbing for Tamiflu, Flashback Guy Returns
| 38 | May 6, 2009 | Amy Poehler, Diego Luna & Gael García Bernal | The National ("So Far Around The Bend") |
O and Joe, Downstairs Neighbors, Local News
| 39 | May 7, 2009 | Martha Stewart, Mike Epps | Ben Harper & Relentless7 ("Number with No Name") |
Slow Jam the News, Beaming into the Studio, Martha Stewart Craft Demo
| 40 | May 8, 2009 | Zachary Quinto & Leonard Nimoy, Joan Rivers | Rachael Ray |
Bridge Acting with Zachary Quinto & Leonard Nimoy, iPod Playlists, Cooking Demo: Rachael Ray
| 41 | May 11, 2009 | Susan Sarandon, Randy Jackson | Soulja Boy Tell 'Em ("Turn My Swag On") |
GM's New Cars, Animals with Fake Arms, Jimmy's Degree, Jimmy Hangs Diploma, Randy Jackson "Midnight Special"
| 42 | May 12, 2009 | Andy Samberg, Jorge Garcia | The Lonely Island (I'm On a Boat) |
Trump 108, Jimmy Fallon Dance Challenge
| 43 | May 13, 2009 | Jane Krakowski, Jeff Probst, Beat Freaks | Bo Burnham |
Freestylin' with the Roots, Rollerskating with Jane Krakowski
| 44 | May 14, 2009 | Maya Rudolph, Damon Wayans Jr., Mindy Kaling | Asher Roth ("Be By Myself") |
Lawst, Shared Experiences
| 45 | May 15, 2009 | Shawn & Marlon Wayans, Steve Kroft | Yusuf ("Father and Son") |
Tu-Spock, Facebook Status, Shawn & Marlon Wayans "Brother Trivia"
| 46 | May 18, 2009 | Simon Baker, Carla Gugino | Method Man & Redman ("A-Yo") |
TV Show Mashups, Indy Driver Milk Chugging Contest, Beef Solvers, Surfing Simulater with Simon Baker
| 47 | May 19, 2009 | Matt Lauer, Mary McCormack, Dana White | Iron & Wine ("Godless Brother In Love") |
Who Cares Hindenburg, Lick It for Ten, Matt Lauer and the Deer
| 48 | May 20, 2009 | Jim Cramer, Bryce Dallas Howard | Dierks Bentley ("Sideways") |
College Photos, Lesser-Known Animals, Target Demographics: Models
| 49 | May 21, 2009 | Kiefer Sutherland, Ivanka Trump | Billy Boy On Poison ("On My Way") |
iPhone Apps, Air Drums, Beer Pong: Jimmy vs. Ivanka
| 50 | May 22, 2009 | Keith Olbermann, Sig Hansen | Chrisette Michele ("Epiphany") |
Terminator Eye, Dance Challenge Final Update, Deep Sea Fishing with Sig Hansen
| 51 | May 25, 2009 | Beastie Boys, The Amazing Kreskin | David Cook ("Come Back to Me") |
Smooth Operators, The Amazing Kreskin Demo
| 52 | May 26, 2009 | Whoopi Goldberg, Stephen Baldwin | Keane ("Again and Again") |
Head Swap, Obama Facial Expressions
| 53 | May 27, 2009 | Brooke Shields, Kris Allen, Chris Hardwick | The-Dream ("Walkin' on the Moon") |
Jimmy Fallon Dance Challenge Winner, Hot Dog in the Hole: World Leaders Edition
| 54 | May 28, 2009 | Jack McBrayer, Janeane Garofalo | Rodney Atkins ("15 Minutes") |
Dance Challenge Pay-Off, Too Many Social Networks
| 55 | May 29, 2009 | Justin Long, Tony Hawk | Nacho Figueras |
Take a Knee, Spelling Bee Pep Talk, Freestylin' with the Roots, Tony Hawk Skateboard Stunt, Jimmy & Justin Say Goodbye

=== June ===
| No. | Original release date | Guest(s) | Musical/entertainment guest(s) |
|---|---|---|---|
| 56 | June 1, 2009 | Anne Hathaway, Will Forte, Jon Favreau | Mario Batali |
Slow Jam the News: California Economy, 7th Floor West - Episode 4, Will Forte sings his own Late Night with Jimmy Fallon theme song
| 57 | June 2, 2009 | Steve Martin, Vanessa Williams, Paul Simon | Paul Simon ("Late in the Evening") |
Celebrity Impressions, Steve Martin's Party Photos, Steve Martin & Paul Simon
| 58 | June 3, 2009 | Danny McBride, Sean Riley | Dave Matthews Band ("Funny the Way It Is" and "Why I Am") |
Airbrushing the News, Dave Matthews GPS, National Fist Bump Day
| 59 | June 4, 2009 | Jessica Biel, Rachel Dratch, Jason Sudeikis | Doves ("The Outsiders") |
Old Ladies Under the Stairs, Jason Sudeikis' E3 Footage
| 60 | June 5, 2009 | Bradley Cooper, Denise Richards | Mandy Moore ("I Could Break Your Heart Any Day of the Week") |
Wheel of Carpet Samples, Real Names Real Jobs
| 61 | June 8, 2009 | Kelly Ripa, Mark-Paul Gosselaar | Amadou & Mariam ("Africa") |
Saved by the Bell Reunion Update, 7th Floor West - Episode 5, iPhone Warm-Up, Lick It for Ten: Kelly Ripa
| 62 | June 9, 2009 | Will Ferrell, Kyra Sedgwick | Mos Def ("Casa Bey") |
Beef Solvers: Clay Aiken and Adam Lambert, Let Us Play with Your Look, Will Ferrell Intense Interview
| 63 | June 10, 2009 | John Krasinski, Stephen Moyer, Kudo Tsunoda | Manchester Orchestra ("I've Got Friends") |
Target Demo: Balds, Cell Phone Shootout, Project Natal Demo
| 64 | June 11, 2009 | Betty White, Opie and Anthony (from Opie and Anthony) | Martha Wainwright ("C'est toujours la même histoire") |
Local Market Promos, Hot Dog in a Hole, Beer Pong: Jimmy vs. Betty White
| 65 | June 12, 2009 | Mary J. Blige, Harold Ramis | Jarod Miller |
Jimmy's Failed Sitcoms, Do the Right Bing, Jarod Miller's Animals
| 66 | June 15, 2009 | Matthew Broderick, Sean Avery, Spencer and Heidi Pratt | Jason Aldean ("She's Country") |
7th Floor West - Episode 6, Dance Your Hat and Gloves Off
| 67 | June 16, 2009 | Horatio Sanz, Selena Gomez | Hank Williams Jr. ("Red, White & Pink-Slip Blues") |
"Horacio", Air Drum Contest
| 68 | June 17, 2009 | Al Roker, Gary Vaynerchuk, Joshua Topolsky | Street Sweeper Social Club ("100 Little Curses") |
Obama Fly Swat/Karate Kid, Lick It for Ten, Al Roker Weather Demo, iPhone 3 Demo
| 69 | June 18, 2009 | Ryan Reynolds, Lauren Conrad | The Fray ("Never Say Never") |
iPhone Apps, Rush Limbaugh Karaoke, Beer Shuffleboard: Jimmy vs. Ryan Reynolds
| 70 | June 19, 2009 | Jeff Goldblum, Mike Birbiglia | Tamra Davis |
Audience Endorsement, Goldblum Endorsement, Obama expressions, Who Cares Hindenburg
| 71 | June 22, 2009 | John Leguizamo, Nick Cannon | Sonic Youth ("No Way") |
7th Floor West - Episode 7, Freestylin' with the Roots
| 72 | June 23, 2009 | Abigail Breslin, James Purefoy, Blake Griffin | The BPA featuring Iggy Pop ("He's Frank") |
Celebrity Game Pitch, Head Swap Vol.II, Slam Dunk Contest
| 73 | June 24, 2009 | Richard Branson, Dwight Howard, Neil deGrasse Tyson | The Roots ("How I Got Over") |
Sketch Endings, Jimmy's Businessman Dunk
| 74 | June 25, 2009 | Tiger Woods, Evan Rachel Wood | Dinosaur Jr. ("Pieces") |
Slow Jam the News: Healthcare, Real Animals Fake Arms, Rejected Transformers Catchphrases, Tiger Woods Wii Golf Game
| 75 | June 26, 2009 | Cameron Diaz, Universal Record Database | Grizzly Bear ("Cheerleader") |
Celebrity Fireworks, Mark Sanford Karaoke, Questlove Afro Pick Record, Cameron Diaz Intense Interview

=== July ===
| No. | Original release date | Guest(s) | Musical/entertainment guest(s) |
|---|---|---|---|
| 76 | July 13, 2009 | Dylan McDermott, Wendy Williams | Sam Talbot |
7th Floor West - Episode 8, Cell Phone Shootout
| 77 | July 14, 2009 | Seann William Scott, Keyshawn Johnson | Daniel Merriweather featuring Wale ("Change") |
Letters Home, Extreme Audience Makeunder
| 78 | July 15, 2009 | Kevin Connolly, Alexa Chung | Aimee Mann ("Freeway") |
Shared Experiences
| 79 | July 16, 2009 | Lauren Graham, Bill Engvall | Jonas Brothers ("Paranoid") |
Robert Pattinson vs. Daniel Radcliffe, Lick It for Ten
| 80 | July 17, 2009 | Anna Paquin, Mancow Muller | The Dead Weather ("Treat Me Like Your Mother") |
People's Impressions, Do The Right Bing
| 81 | July 20, 2009 | Will Arnett, Emmanuelle Chriqui | Tom Jones ("Never") |
7th Floor West - Episode 9, iPhone Apps
| 82 | July 21, 2009 | Alec Baldwin, Michael Ian Black, Michael Showalter | Jordin Sparks ("Battlefield") |
Let Us Play with Your Look, Beef Solvers
| 83 | July 22, 2009 | Fred Armisen, The Mighty Boosh | Flo Rida ("Jump") |
Obama Facial Expressions, Hot Dog In A Hole
| 84 | July 23, 2009 | Kevin Nealon, Demi Lovato | Jeff Musial |
Facebook Status Updates, Real Animals, Fake Arms
| 85 | July 24, 2009 | Bob Saget, Anthony Mackie | John Mulaney |
Thank You Notes, HR3200 Infomercial, Bob Saget Driving PSA
| 86 | July 27, 2009 | Holly Hunter, Mark Seliger | Spinal Tap ("Back From The Dead") |
Jimmy at Comic-Con, 7th Floor West - Episode 10
| 87 | July 28, 2009 | Sean Combs, Marissa Jaret Winokur | Tom Colicchio |
Slow Jam The News, Bromance Novels
| 88 | July 29, 2009 | Leslie Mann, Michael Lang | Passion Pit ("The Reeling") |
Head Swap, Dance Your Hat and Gloves Off
| 89 | July 30, 2009 | Ashley Tisdale, Tim Meadows | Jarvis Cocker ("Further Complications") |
Toppy The Topical Newspaper, Air Drum Contest
| 90 | July 31, 2009 | Adam Sandler | Jimmy Buffett ("Margaritaville") |
Rush Limbaugh Karaoke, Thank You Notes

=== August ===
| No. | Original release date | Guest(s) | Musical/entertainment guest(s) |
|---|---|---|---|
| 91 | August 3, 2009 | Marlon Wayans, Judd Apatow | Incubus ("Let's Go Crazy"/"Love Hurts") |
7th Floor West - Episode 11, Watermelon Seed Spitting Competition
| 92 | August 4, 2009 | Channing Tatum, Joan Rivers | Arctic Monkeys ("Crying Lightning") |
Late Night Timeline, Freestylin' With The Roots
| 93 | August 5, 2009 | Chris Kattan, Joe Scarborough | Hannibal Buress |
Jimmy's Failed Sitcoms, Intern Contest Kick-Off, Take a Knee, Paula Abdul
| 94 | August 6, 2009 | Jeremy Piven, Charlyne Yi | Melanie Fiona |
Robert Is Bothered, Wheel Of Carpet Samples
| 95 | August 7, 2009 | Paul Giamatti, Ken Jeong | Julian Plenti |
Thank You Notes, Do The Right Bing
| 96 | August 10, 2009 | Eric Bana, Jordana Spiro, Jeanine Mason | Fall Out Boy ("What a Catch, Donnie") |
7th Floor West - Episode 12, Real Housewives Of Late Night Preview
| 97 | August 11, 2009 | Ashton Kutcher, Triple H | Bat for Lashes ("Daniel") |
Thought Bubbles, Cell Phone Shootout
| 98 | August 12, 2009 | Jon Hamm, Hugh Dancy | Kitty, Daisy & Lewis |
Health Care Town Hall - Warm Up, Letters Home
| 99 | August 13, 2009 | Seth Green, Tim Gunn | Avenue Q |
Ipod Playlist, Empty Your Pockets
| 100 | August 14, 2009 | Tracy Morgan | Neal Brennan |
100th Show Bet With Robert De Niro, Thank You Notes, Dance Challenge - Jimmy Fallon Dip
| 101 | August 31, 2009 | Rachel Maddow, Tommy Davidson | Jet |
U.S. Open Ball Boy Tryouts, Freestylin' With The Roots, Mixing Drinks with Rachel Maddow

=== September ===
| No. | Original release date | Guest(s) | Musical/entertainment guest(s) |
|---|---|---|---|
| 102 | September 1, 2009 | Joan Allen, Rob Zombie | Michael Franti |
Obama Facial Expressions, John Madden Karaoke
| 103 | September 2, 2009 | John Leguizamo, Jeff Musial, Dr. Oz | Smokey Robinson |
Lick It For $10 - Football Edition
| 104 | September 3, 2009 | Jason Bateman, Ashlee Simpson | Shadows Fall |
TV Show Mash-Ups, Intern Contest Check-In, Who Cares Hindenburg
| 105 | September 4, 2009 | Bob Costas, Jamie-Lynn Sigler | Pet Shop Boys |
Thank You Notes, Think About It
| 106 | September 8, 2009 | Elijah Wood, Taraji P. Henson | John Fogerty |
Robert Is Bothered, Beef Solvers, Beatles Rock Band: Derby
| 107 | September 9, 2009 | Ed Westwick, Queen Latifah | Queen Latifah |
Late Night Timelines, Cell Phone Shootout
| 108 | September 10, 2009 | Tyler Perry, Amber Tamblyn | Mario Batali |
Dance Your Hat And Gloves Off, You Lie
| 109 | September 11, 2009 | Russell Brand, Kaitlin Olson | George Jones |
Thank You Notes, Do The Right Bing
| 110 | September 14, 2009 | John McCain, Miranda Cosgrove | Rufus Wainwright |
Slow Jam The News, Real Housewives Of Late Night - Episode 1
| 111 | September 15, 2009 | Anna Faris, Alan Cumming | Ghostface Killah featuring Raheem DeVaughn |
iPhone Apps, Product Placement Preacher, Space Train - Anna Faris
| 112 | September 16, 2009 | Charlize Theron, David Boreanaz | Q-Tip |
New College Courses, Shock Absorbers, Beer Pong: Jimmy Vs. Charlize Theron
| 113 | September 17, 2009 | Dennis Quaid, Elisabeth Moss | Megadeth |
?uestions, Facebook Status Updates
| 114 | September 18, 2009 | Danny DeVito, James Blake | Keri Hilson |
Thank You Notes, Intern Contest Reveal
| 115 | September 21, 2009 | Clive Owen, Joanna Garcia | Living Colour |
Audience Orientation Video, Empty Your Pockets
| 116 | September 22, 2009 | Seth Meyers | Chris Paul |
Head Swap, Ultimate Mustache Fighting, Seth and Josh Meyers "Brother Trivia", Elevator Dodgeball - Fallon & Paul Vs. Meyers Brothers
| 117 | September 23, 2009 | Amy Poehler, Dan Fogler | Parkour Athletes, Wayne Federman |
Flashback Guy #3, Poehler Stroller Derby
| 118 | September 24, 2009 | Megan Fox, Anthony Anderson, Nick Swisher | Phoenix |
New Reality Shows, Target Demo - 5th Year Seniors
| 119 | September 25, 2009 | Julianna Margulies, Kevin Smith | Michael Schlow |
Thank You Notes, Wheel Of Carpet Samples, Charades with Julianna Margulies
| 120 | September 28, 2009 | David Duchovny, Kimbo Slice | Dirty Projectors |
Slice Brothers Breakaway Furniture, Freestylin' With The Roots
| 121 | September 29, 2009 | Usain Bolt, Jude Law, Felicia Day | Sunny Day Real Estate |
Hot Dog In A Hole - Full House Edition
| 122 | September 30, 2009 | Jack McBrayer, Amy Brenneman, Jeff Musial | Owen Benjamin |
Who Cares Hindenberg

=== October ===
| No. | Original release date | Guest(s) | Musical/entertainment guest(s) |
|---|---|---|---|
| 123 | October 1, 2009 | Ryan Reynolds, Emma Stone | Miranda Lambert |
Real Housewives Of Late Night - Episode 2, Shuffleboard Game with Ryan Reynolds
| 124 | October 2, 2009 | Drew Barrymore, Tim Schafer | The Ettes |
Thank You Notes
| 125 | October 5, 2009 | Kristen Wiig, David Wells | Christopher Cross |
Shared Experiences, Yacht Rock, Foam Noodles with Kristen Wiig
| 126 | October 6, 2009 | Peter Sarsgaard, Lewis Black | They Might Be Giants |
Obama Facial Expressions, Lick It For $10
| 127 | October 7, 2009 | Chevy Chase, Eliza Dushku | Lenny Kravitz |
Letters Home
| 128 | October 8, 2009 | Christopher Meloni, Eve | Alton Brown |
Dance Your Hat & Gloves Off, Brawl on the Mall, Three-Point Shootout with Christopher Meloni
| 129 | October 9, 2009 | Martin Short, Jeff Lewis | Cory Chisel |
Thank You Notes, I Bet You Didn't Think That Would Happen
| 130 | October 12, 2009 | Kathie Lee Gifford, Penn Badgley | Love and Theft |
Billy Ray Cyrus Twitter Video, Kirk's Columbus Day Song, Name That Tune with Kathie Lee Gifford
| 131 | October 13, 2009 | Andy Samberg, Greg Proops, Jim Botsacos | N/A |
Slow Jam The News, Empty Your Pockets
| 132 | October 14, 2009 | Monty Python (John Cleese, Terry Gilliam, Eric Idle, and Terry Jones) | Eric Idle ("Always Look on the Bright Side of Life") |
Wheel of Carpet Samples
| 133 | October 15, 2009 | Gerard Butler, Ivanka Trump | Hockey |
Real Housewives Of Late Night - Episode 3, Intern Jason - Trading, Beer Pong - Ivanka Trump
| 134 | October 16, 2009 | Eddie Izzard, Gina Gershon | Amy Schumer |
Thank You Notes, Brannock Foot-Measuring Device, Unicycle with Eddie Izzard
| 135 | October 26, 2009 | Willem Dafoe, Tim Gunn | Har Mar Superstar ("Tall Boy") |
New Velvet Elvises, Freestylin' With The Roots
| 136 | October 27, 2009 | Artie Lange, Olivia Munn | David Chang |
Cellphone Shootout, ?uestions, Ping Pong with Olivia Munn
| 137 | October 28, 2009 | Edward Norton, Hulk Hogan | "Weird Al" Yankovic ("CNR") |
Halloween Lamp, Ultimate Mustache Fighter - Stache Bash II Stubble Trubble
| 138 | October 29, 2009 | Carrie Fisher, Sam Rockwell | Mastodon |
Robert Is Bothered, Think About It
| 139 | October 30, 2009 | Wanda Sykes, Josh Charles, The Amazing Kreskin | Andrew Bird |
Thank You Notes

=== November ===
| No. | Original release date | Guest(s) | Musical/entertainment guest(s) |
|---|---|---|---|
| 140 | November 2, 2009 | Taylor Swift, Scott Wolf, Joshua Topolsky | Say Anything |
Who Cares Hindenburg, Lonely Pumpkin
| 141 | November 3, 2009 | Jason Sudeikis, Matt Bomer | Reba McEntire |
Kirk's Election Day Song, Dance Your Hat & Gloves Off, Three-Point Shootout with Jason Sudeikis
| 142 | November 4, 2009 | Cameron Diaz, Shaun White | Monsters of Folk |
Obama Expressions, Charades With Cameron Diaz, Shaun White Wii Snowboarding Demo
| 143 | November 5, 2009 | Ian McKellen, Paula Patton | Yoko Ono, Sean Lennon |
Joba Chamberlin Plays with The Roots, The Real Housewives Of Late Night - Episode 4, Butt Weight
| 144 | November 6, 2009 | Rosie O'Donnell, Ian Somerhalder, Joshua Topolsky | DJ Jazzy Jeff |
Thank You Notes, Product Placement Preacher
| 145 | November 9, 2009 | Laurence Fishburne, Elmo, Rosita | N/A |
Shout Outs, Rush Limbaugh Karaoke
| 146 | November 10, 2009 | Jeff Musial, January Jones, Troy Polamalu, Olubowale Folarin | Wale |
Hot Dog In A Hole - Twilight Edition, Troy Polamalu Tackling Demo with January Jones, Beer Pong - January Jones
| 147 | November 11, 2009 | Jason Schwartzman, Joan Cusack | Carly Simon |
Rejected Call Of Duty Characters, Celebrity Man Boobs
| 148 | November 12, 2009 | Kate Walsh, Penn & Teller | Goodie Mob |
Slow Jam The News, iPhone Apps, Penn & Teller Magic Trick
| 149 | November 13, 2009 | Amanda Peet, Steven Ward | Kid Sister ("Right Hand Hi") |
Thank You Notes, I Bet You Didn't Think That Would Happen
| 150 | November 16, 2009 | Tim McGraw, Anna Torv | Josh Capon |
Politicians About To Kiss, Audience iPod Playlist
| 151 | November 17, 2009 | Shakira, Cheech Marin, Tommy Chong | Neko Case |
Sarah Palin's Going Rogue: Goes Rogue, Shock Absorbers - New York Giants, Cheech & Chong - Song
| 152 | November 18, 2009 | Kristen Stewart, Jamie Kennedy | Avett Brothers |
Late Night Green Night Eco-Jam, Wheel of Carpet Samples, Kristen Stewart Football Throws
| 153 | November 19, 2009 | Taylor Lautner, Katey Sagal | Obits |
Robert Is Bothered, Ultimate Mustache Fighter 3 - Brimley Vs. Shalit, Taylor Lautner Mini-Bike Race
| 154 | November 20, 2009 | Joseph Gordon-Levitt | Elvis Costello |
Thank You Notes, The Real Housewives of Late Night - Episode 5, Joseph Gordon-Levitt Laser Duel
| 155 | November 23, 2009 | Blake Lively, Tommy Lee | Ilo Ferreira |
Letters Home, Neil Young Sings Fresh Prince
| 156 | November 24, 2009 | Claire Danes, Chad Ocho Cinco | The Pixies |
Who Cares Hindenburg, Cell Phone Shootout, Late Night End Zone Celebrations with Chad Ochocinco
| 157 | November 25, 2009 | Seth Green, Padma Lakshmi | Mos Def, Talib Kweli |
Post-Apocalyptic Andy Rooney, Lick It For $10 - Thanksgiving Edition
| 158 | November 26, 2009 | Robin Williams, Rashida Jones | N/A |
Thank You Notes, I Love Stuffing Song - Rashida Jones, "Holiday Road" performed with Rashida Jones, Jimmy Fallon & The Roots
| 159 | November 27, 2009 | Fred Armisen, Carey Mulligan, Daniel Boulud | N/A |
Freestylin' With The Roots, Drum Impressions with Fred Armisen, Late Night Charades with Fred Armisen, Elizabeth Moss & Amy Poehler

=== December ===
| No. | Original release date | Guest(s) | Musical/entertainment guest(s) |
|---|---|---|---|
| 160 | December 7, 2009 | Jason Bateman, 50 Cent, Meghan Rickey, Cheyne Whitney | 50 Cent |
Shoutouts, Jimmy Learns To Luge
| 161 | December 8, 2009 | Rachel Maddow, Tom Ford | Jawbox |
12 Days of Christmas Sweaters Day 12, Jimmy's "Avatar" Catchphrases
| 162 | December 9, 2009 | Bon Jovi, Susie Essman | Bon Jovi |
12 Days of Christmas Sweaters Day 11, Pep Talk - Tiger Woods, Rush Limbaugh Karaoke
| 163 | December 10, 2009 | Julianne Moore, David Alan Grier | Blakroc |
12 Days of Christmas Sweaters Day 10, Real Housewives Of Late Night - Episode 6
| 164 | December 11, 2009 | Mary Steenburgen, Snoop Dogg | Snoop Dogg |
12 Days of Christmas Sweaters Day 9, Thank You Notes, Think About It, Snoop Dogg reads Dr. Seuss
| 165 | December 14, 2009 | Kate Hudson, Giovanni Ribisi | Chevelle |
12 Days of Christmas Sweaters Day 8, Late Night Timeline, Letters to Santa, Beer Pong - Kate Hudson
| 166 | December 15, 2009 | Marion Cotillard, Jason Reitman | Anne Burrell |
Slow Jam The News, 12 Days of Christmas Sweaters Day 7, Jewey Fallon
| 167 | December 16, 2009 | Jeff Musial, Sarah Jessica Parker, Deepak Chopra | Raekwon |
12 Days Of Christmas Sweaters Day 6, Gift Wrapping Guide
| 168 | December 17, 2009 | Paul Shaffer, Chris Jericho | Boyz II Men |
12 Days Of Christmas Sweaters Day 5, Product Placement Preacher, Dance Your Hat And Gloves Off: Christmas Edition
| 169 | December 18, 2009 | Jude Law, Abby Elliott, Joshua Topolsky | Ronnie Spector |
12 Days Of Christmas Sweaters Day 4, Thank You Notes, Sherlock Holmes Screen Test
| 170 | December 21, 2009 | Martha Stewart, Jeffrey Ross | Julian Casablancas |
12 Days Of Christmas Sweaters Day 3, Freestylin' with The Roots
| 171 | December 22, 2009 | Tom Arnold, Hannah Teter | Michael McDonald |
12 Days Of Christmas Sweaters Day 2, Jimmy's Christmas Song - Drunk On Christmas, Real Housewives Of Late Night - Bonus Footage
| 172 | December 23, 2009 | Joy Behar, Jonny Lee Miller, The Muppets | N/A |
12 Days Of Christmas Sweaters Day 1, Real Housewives Of Late Night - Episode 7
