= The Outline (website) =

News and culture website

- Website type: News, offbeat, cultural topics and analysis
- Available in: English
- Headquarters: New York City, U.S.
- Owner: Bustle
- Website: theoutline.com
- Commercial: Yes
- Registration: None
- Launched: 2016; 10 years ago
- Current status: Defunct April 3, 2020; 6 years ago

The Outline is an out-of-print online publication focused on "power, culture, and the future." It was founded independently by Joshua Topolsky in 2016 and later became a subsidiary of Bustle.

The company did not want to be too reliant on social media distribution, but instead aimed to reach a "smart, influential" readership who would visit its website directly. The articles are visually interactive, and highly optimized for mobile. The interface contains articles represented as a stack of cards that users can swipe through. The company earned income by virtue of its partnerships with 10 to 12 companies a year, as opposed to reliance on a format employing traditional banner ads.

== History ==
The Outline was founded in 2016 under a holding company named Independent Media with funding from RRE Ventures, Advancit Capital, Boat Rocker Ventures and Nextview Ventures. The company initially hired 10 employees and launched its website on December 5, 2016. It later grew to 26 employees, having recruited people from news media outlets like Vox Media, Vice News, and BuzzFeed. In April 2017, The Outline introduced The Outline World Dispatch, a short daily podcast with news roundups.

The company announced a second fund-raising in May 2018 of $5.15M, stating that it would use the money for "measured growth." U.S. broadcast television company TEGNA signed on as a new investor, having earlier announced a content partnership as part of the investment in February 2018.

In June 2018, The Outline let go of a writer and editor from its Power section. Joshua Topolsky, the website's founder and CEO, characterized the two as "underperforming employees." However, after receiving criticism, he apologized for his earlier statement.

Later that year in September, the website laid off two full-time staff writers and also planned to move its office into a co-working space. Topolsky said the actions were necessary to "move the business into a break-even financial position."

Study Hall, a collective of freelance writers, expressed its disapproval with The Outline's layoffs. A Study Hall member told Observer, "we don’t want management to think that it’s OK to fire their employees and rely on us to pick up the slack." The group's members pledged not to work with the website and encouraged others to follow its lead.

On March 27, 2019, it was announced that Bryan Goldberg and his company Bustle Digital Media had bought The Outline. Despite the sale, Joshua Topolsky would still run the website.

On April 3, 2020, executive editor Leah Finnegan announced that the entire editorial team had been laid off. The last article posted on the site was by Finnegan, on March 20, 2020. She would later go on to be editor of the Gawker website.
