= List of Late Night with Jimmy Fallon episodes (2010) =

- No. of episodes: 196

Release
- Original network: NBC

Season chronology
- ← Previous; 2009 episodes Next → 2011 episodes

This is the list of episodes for Late Night with Jimmy Fallon in 2010.

== 2010 ==
=== January ===
No.	Original release date	Guest(s)	Musical/entertainment guest(s)
173	January 4, 2010	Bill Hader, Fred Willard	Japandroids
?uestions, Cell Phone Shootout
174	January 5, 2010	Michael Cera, Ana Gasteyer	Shwayze
Wheel of Carpet Samples, Taboo - Michael Cera
175	January 6, 2010	Ethan Hawke, Gabourey Sidibe	Clipse
Post-Apocalyptic Andy Rooney, Celebrity Man Boobs, Three-Point Shootout with Ethan Hawke
176	January 7, 2010	Amy Adams, John Oliver	Fela
New Velvet Elvises, Bull Riding Lessons, Karaoke Time - Amy Adams
177	January 8, 2010	Matthew Broderick, Ashley Greene	Nick Jonas and the Administration ("Who I Am")
Thank You Notes, Dance Your Hat and Gloves Off
178	January 11, 2010	Maggie Gyllenhaal, David Ortiz	Lenny Clarke
Obama Expressions, Competitive Spit Takes
179	January 12, 2010	Ringo Starr	Ringo Starr
Freestylin' with the Roots
180	January 13, 2010	Freddie Prinze Jr., Anthony Anderson	Kesha ("Tik Tok")
Head Swap, Air Drum Challenge
181	January 14, 2010	Sigourney Weaver, Jeremy Renner	Loudon Wainwright III
Neil Young covers Pants on the Ground, Who Cares Hindenburg, Ultimate Mustache Fighter 4 "Hell's Unshaven" - Brimley vs. 80's Bird, Beer Pong - Sigourney Weaver
182	January 15, 2010	Kiefer Sutherland, Kerry Washington	Hotrats ("Queen Bitch")
Thank You Notes, Hot Dog in a Hole - Fox News Edition
183	January 18, 2010	Ashley Judd, Jimmie Johnson	The Cribs
Shout Outs, Video Vision - Fire Safety, Bumper Car Race
184	January 19, 2010	Randy Jackson, Paul Teutul Sr.	The Mountain Goats
iPhone Apps, Product Placement Preacher
185	January 20, 2010	Tom Brokaw, Richard Belzer, Kerry Rhodes	Switchfoot
Obama's Angel and Devil, Audience Suggestion Box
186	January 21, 2010	Queen Latifah, Rose Byrne	Fela!
Lick It for $10 - Winter Games Edition, Late Night Charades with Queen Latifah
187	January 22, 2010	Brendan Fraser, Tracey Ullman	Beach House
A Tribute to Conan O'Brien at Studio 6A, Thank You Notes, Biathlon

=== February ===
No.	Original release date	Guest(s)	Musical/entertainment guest(s)
188	February 1, 2010	Rosario Dawson, Tony Siragusa	New Kids on the Block
6-bee, Cell Phone Shootout
189	February 2, 2010	Meredith Vieira, Jesse Tyler Ferguson	Motion City Soundtrack
Kirk's Groundhog Day Song, Competitive Spit Takes, Snowball Throwing Contest
190	February 3, 2010	Jessica Alba, Michael Strahan	Harper Simon
?uestions, Dance Your Hat and Gloves Off, Beer Pong - Jessica Alba
191	February 4, 2010	Channing Tatum, Aubrey Plaza	Hot Chip
TV Show Mash-Ups, Freestylin' with the Roots, Three-Point Shootout with Channing Tatum
192	February 5, 2010	Brian Williams, Amanda Seyfried	Sean Patton
Slow Jam the News with Brian Williams, Thank You Notes, Grad Students Super Bowl
193	February 8, 2010	Stephen Colbert, Willie Garson	Éric Ripert
Late Preview, Late Night Recognizes the Olympics - Snow Bobbing, Tea Party Karaoke
194	February 9, 2010	Jeff Musial, Bill Paxton, James Van Der Beek	Regina Spektor
Spider-Man & Superman Brothers Breakdance, Late Night Recognizes the Olympics - Ski Boot Power Walking, Jeff Musial's Animals
195	February 10, 2010	Dick Cavett, Christian Siriano	Yeasayer
Late Night Recognizes the Olympics - Finger Skating, Product Placement Preacher
196	February 11, 2010	John Lithgow, Jessica Szohr	Neon Indian
Robert is Bothered, Cougar Hunting Song, Late Trailer
197	February 12, 2010	Benicio del Toro, Selena Gomez, Kim Kardashian, Reggie Bush	Selena Gomez & the Scene ("Naturally")
Thank You Notes, Late - Episode 1

=== March ===
No.	Original release date	Guest(s)	Musical/entertainment guest(s)
198	March 1, 2010	Robert Pattinson, Judah Friedlander	Mario Batali
Anniversary Song - Freshman 15, Late - Episode 2, Robert Is Bothered
199	March 2, 2010	Wesley Snipes, Emilie de Ravin	Ludacris ("How Low")
Shout Outs, Ultimate Mustache Fighter 5 "Mucho Macho Mayhem" - '70s Reynolds vs. '80s Selleck, Three-Point Shootout with Wesley Snipes
200	March 3, 2010	Barbara Walters, Regina King	Erykah Badu
Video Vision - Sexual Harassment, Audience Suggestion Box
201	March 4, 2010	Zach Galifianakis, Mia Wasikowska	Silversun Pickups
California Dreams Reunion, Let Us Play with Your Look
202	March 5, 2010	Mike Myers, Matt Lucas	Joanna Newsom
Thank You Notes, Winds of War, Mike's Canada Corner
203	March 8, 2010	Abigail Breslin, Chris Parnell	Ted Leo and the Pharmacists
Who Cares Hindenburg, Freestylin' with the Roots, Lazy Sunday
204	March 9, 2010	Chelsea Handler, Matt Walsh	Allman Brothers ("Whipping Post")
President of the Audience, Martini Race (Jimmy Fallon Cuts Hand)
205	March 10, 2010	Forest Whitaker, Rachael Harris	The National
Letters Home, Blimp Race
206	March 11, 2010	Michael Moore, Chris Hardwick	Broken Bells ("Holiday")
Eric Massa's Larry King Interview Outtakes, Dancing on Air
207	March 12, 2010	Parker Posey, Jason Sudeikis	Vampire Weekend
Thank You Letters, Cell Phone Shootout, Jimmy and Parker Dance-Off
208	March 15, 2010	Julianne Moore, Toni Collette	Freeway
Obama Expressions, Late Night Charades with Julianne Moore & Toni Collette, Late Promo
209	March 16, 2010	Kristen Stewart, Bee Gees, Dr. Drew Pinsky	The Script ("Breakeven")
Late - Episode 3
210	March 17, 2010	Dakota Fanning, Joseph Fiennes	The XX
Siena Saints Support, Irish Spring Breaker Song, Wheel of Carpet Samples
211	March 18, 2010	Lucy Liu, Gene Simmons	Universal Record Database
Go Siena Go, Dance Your Hat and Gloves Off, Beer Pong - Lucy Liu
212	March 19, 2010	Ted Danson, Kara DioGuardi	Air
Thank You Notes, Siena Wrap-Up, Battle of the Instant Bands, Ted Danson Boring Interview
213	March 22, 2010	Alicia Silverstone, Mark Valley	Rogue Wave
Parliamentary Procedure, Hot Dog in a Hole - Health Care Heroes Edition, Rockapella, Fake Fighting Lesson with Mark Valley
214	March 23, 2010	Janet Jackson, John Cena	The Besnard Lakes
Pros & Cons - Health Care Reform, Competitive Spit Takes
215	March 24, 2010	Ben Stiller, Hoda Kotb	Clientele
Big Effing Deal Bill, ?uestions, Health Care Hits Karaoke
216	March 25, 2010	Liev Schreiber, Rob Corddry	Robert Randolph ("Purple Haze")
Freestylin' with the Roots, Audience Suggestion Box
217	March 26, 2010	Bryan Cranston, Jill Scott	Morgan Murphy
Thank You Notes, Beef Solvers
218	March 29, 2010	Jeff Goldblum, Jennifer Morrison	Julian Casablancas
Slow Jam the News with Brian Williams, Ultimate Mustache Fighter 6 - Santana vs. Oates
219	March 30, 2010	Fred Armisen, Chuck Liddell	Moshe Kasher
Late - Episode 4, Chuck Liddell Choke Hold Lesson
220	March 31, 2010	Tyler Perry, Dan Dunn's Paint Jam	Drive-By Truckers
Pros & Cons - Dancing with the Stars, Dancing on Air, Remote Control Blimp Race

=== April ===
No.	Original release date	Guest(s)	Musical/entertainment guest(s)
221	April 1, 2010	Ricky Gervais, Anthony Mackie	Easton Corbin ("A Little More Country Than That")
iPhone Apps, Put It in Reverse
222	April 2, 2010	Sam Worthington, Joshua Topolsky	Liquid Liquid
Thank You Notes, Rejected "Clash of the Titans" Catchphrases, A Look at the iPad
223	April 5, 2010	Jeff Musial, Bob Costas, James Badge Dale	Peter Wolf with Shelby Lynne
Dancing with the Cardboard Cutouts of the Stars, Jeff Musial's Animals
224	April 6, 2010	Christopher Meloni, Taraji P. Henson	Dr. Dog
Pros & Cons - Tiger Woods' Return to Golf, Kate Gosselin's Paparazzi Dance, Three-Point Shootout with Christopher Meloni
225	April 7, 2010	Rachel Maddow, The Mighty Boosh, Dave Annable	Suzanne Vega
Who Cares Hindenburg, Battle of the Instant Bands, Mixing Drinks with Rachel Maddow
226	April 8, 2010	Tina Fey, Justin Bieber	Mario Batali
6-bee, Late Night Charades - Fallon & Fey vs. Amy Poehler & Seth Meyers
227	April 9, 2010	Jeff Daniels, Olivia Munn	Black Rebel Motorcycle Club
Thank You Notes, Cell Phone Shootout
228	April 12, 2010	Alan Cumming, Greta Gerwig, Cliff Bleszinski	Baron Vaughn
Tiger Woods Giraffe Song, Freestylin' with the Roots, Gears of War 3 World Premiere Trailer - "Ashes To Ashes"
229	April 13, 2010	Kelly Ripa, Eric Stonestreet	The Specials ("A Message to You, Rudy")
Pros & Cons - KFC Double Down Sandwich, Competitive Spit Takes, Beer Pong - Kelly Ripa
230	April 14, 2010	Stevie Starr, Michael J. Fox, Green Day	Kaki King
Spanx But No Spanx
231	April 15, 2010	Chris Rock, Emma Stone	The Unseen
Shout Outs, Say What!?
232	April 16, 2010	Tracy Morgan, Kevin Rose, Alex Albrecht, Ndamukong Suh	The Flaming Lips with Stardeath and White Dwarfs ("Breathe")
Thank You Notes, Strait No Chaser performs medley of TGIF theme songs
233	April 26, 2010	Kathie Lee Gifford, Brian Posehn	Gogol Bordello
Hubble Gotchu, Letters Home, Identify That Ditty with Kathie Lee Gifford
234	April 27, 2010	Brendan Fraser, Rebecca Hall	The Whigs
Pros & Cons - Kentucky Derby, Dance Your Hat and Gloves Off
235	April 28, 2010	Michael Caine, Mary Lynn Rajskub	Sharon Jones & the Dap-Kings
Late - Episode 5
236	April 29, 2010	Ed Burns, Jackie Earle Haley	Paramore
Shared Experiences, Skittles - Fallon vs. Burns
237	April 30, 2010	Gwyneth Paltrow, Colin Quinn	Jabbawockeez
Thank You Notes, Battle of the Instant Bands, The Best of Shazzazz

=== May ===
No.	Original release date	Guest(s)	Musical/entertainment guest(s)
238	May 3, 2010	Sarah Silverman, Joan Rivers	Corinne Bailey Rae
Wheel of Carpet Samples, Let Us Play with Your Look
239	May 4, 2010	Ellen Pompeo, Lea Michele	OK Go
Pros & Cons - Cinco De Mayo, Put It in Reverse
240	May 5, 2010	Joel McHale, Nina Dobrev, Roger Waters	The New Pornographers
Big Heads, Spanx But No Spanx
241	May 6, 2010	Betty White, Oliver Platt	Pete Holmes
New Velvet Elvises, Beer Pong - Betty White
242	May 7, 2010	Maya Rudolph, Common	Court Yard Hounds
Thank You Notes, Cell Phone Shootout, Karaoke Time - Maya Rudolph
243	May 10, 2010	Kristen Wiig, Jim Cramer	Green Day ("Rip This Joint"), Taj Mahal ("Shine a Light")
Lick It for $10 - Rolling Stones Edition
244	May 11, 2010	Evangeline Lilly, Kenan Thompson	Keith Urban ("Tumbling Dice")
Late - Episode 6, Intense Lost Questions
245	May 12, 2010	Queen Latifah, Sheryl Crow	Sheryl Crow ("All Down the Line")
Pros & Cons - Re-release of Exile on Main St., Robert Is Bothered, Three-Point Shootout with Queen Latifah
246	May 13, 2010	Keith Richards, LL Cool J, Sam Rockwell	Phish ("Loving Cup")
Freestylin' with the Roots, featuring Dr. John
247	May 14, 2010	Stones in Exile	N/A
World Premiere of Stones in Exile
248	May 17, 2010	Randy Jackson, David Boreanaz, Russell Hantz, Parvati Shallow, Sandra Diaz-Twine	Public Image Ltd
Competitive Spit Takes
249	May 18, 2010	Matthew Fox, Jane Lynch	Ray Wylie Hubbard
Pros & Cons - Outdoor Summer Concert Festivals, Ladysmith Snack Mambazo - Hot Pockets, Intense Lost Questions, Late Promo
250	May 19, 2010	Jerry Seinfeld, Jesse Eisenberg	Mumford & Sons
Slow Jam the News with Brian Williams, Hubble Gotchu
251	May 20, 2010	Will Forte, Jim Parsons	John Delucie
Late - Episode 7, Will Forte's MacGruber Song
252	May 21, 2010	Donald Trump, Jorge Garcia	Robbie Dupree ("Steal Away")
Yacht Rock 2010, Shared Experiences, Thank You Notes, Yacht Race, Intense Lost Questions
253	May 24, 2010	Sir Ben Kingsley, Rosemarie DeWitt	Kumail Nanjiani
Obama Expressions, Say What!?, Space Train - Sir Ben Kingsley
254	May 25, 2010	Kim Cattrall, Dana White	Frightened Rabbit
Pros & Cons - American Idol Finale, Think About It, Sex and the City 2 Screen Test
255	May 26, 2010	Jake Gyllenhaal, Mario Cantone	The Black Keys
Cold Opening with Dr. Oz, Shout Outs, American Idol Hedgehog Song, Mario Cantone sings Route 66
256	May 27, 2010	Jeff Musial, Ann Curry, JoAnn & Steve Ward	Talib Kweli and Hi-Tek as Reflection Eternal
Remix the Clips, Jeff Musial's Animals, Out of Bounds with Steve & JoAnn Ward
257	May 28, 2010	Ice Cube, Gemma Arterton	Stars
Thank You Notes, Audience Suggestion Box, Jimmy Sings "Balls in Your Mouth"

=== June ===
No.	Original release date	Guest(s)	Musical/entertainment guest(s)
258	June 7, 2010	Molly Shannon, Chris Colfer, Ian Poulter	Kings of Convenience
iPhone Apps, Tiger Woods PGA TOUR 2011 Demo
259	June 8, 2010	Holly Hunter, Lee DeWyze	Circa Survive
Pros & Cons - Going to the Beach, Cell Phone Shootout, BP Oil Spill Song
260	June 9, 2010	Jessica Biel, Craig Robinson	Phish
Jimmy Waves Back to Craig Ferguson, ?uestions, Battle of the Instant Bands, Tandem Bike Ride with Jessica Biel
261	June 10, 2010	John C. Reilly, Justin Bartha, Brendan Hunt	Sarah McLachlan
Remix the Clips, Dance Your Hat and Gloves Off, John C. Reilly Is Not Steve Brule
262	June 11, 2010	Bradley Cooper, Robin Antin	Dave Arnold & Nils Norén
Thank You Notes, Put It in Reverse
263	June 14, 2010	Joy Behar, Carson Kressley	Gail Simmons
Kirk's Flag Day Song, Video Vision - Finding a Hobby
264	June 15, 2010	Cedric the Entertainer, Fred Willard	Broken Social Scene
Pros & Cons - Watching the World Cup, World Cup Commentators, Cedric the Entertainer Entertains
265	June 16, 2010	Lisa Kudrow, Big Show	The Gaslight Anthem
Who Cares Hindenburg, Wheel of Carpet Samples, Late Night Charades Fallon vs. Kudrow
266	June 17, 2010	Seth Meyers, Bethenny Frankel	Blitzen Trapper
Remix the Clips, Competitive Spit Takes, Seth and Josh Meyers "Brother Trivia"
267	June 18, 2010	Kate Walsh, Jim Breuer	The Roots featuring Yim Yames
Thank You Notes, Freestylin' with the Roots
268	June 21, 2010	Jada Pinkett Smith, Miranda Cosgrove, Microsoft Kinect	Travie McCoy ("Billionaire")
Robert is Bothered, Ladysmith Snack Mambazo - Ben & Jerry's, Microsoft Kinect Demo
269	June 22, 2010	Salma Hayek Pinault, Jeffrey Donovan, Call of Duty: Black Ops	Herbie Hancock ("Imagine")
Slow Jam the News with Brian Williams, Pros & Cons - Wimbledon, Call of Duty: Black Ops Demo
270	June 23, 2010	Heidi Klum, Joshua Topolsky, Need for Speed: Hot Pursuit	Macy Gray
At the Bar with Roger Federer, Audience Suggestion Box, BP Oil Spill Song, Need for Speed: Hot Pursuit Demo
271	June 24, 2010	David Spade, Beth Ostrosky Stern, Killzone 3	MGMT
7th Floor West - Episode 13, Killzone 3 Demo
272	June 25, 2010	Adam Sandler, Oliver Stone, David Chang, Donkey Kong Country Returns	Eminem ("Won't Back Down")
Thank You Notes, Donkey Kong Country Returns Demo

=== July ===
No.	Original release date	Guest(s)	Musical/entertainment guest(s)
273	July 12, 2010	Eddie Izzard, Angie Harmon	Big Boi
Shout Outs, Cell Phone Shootout
274	July 13, 2010	Nicolas Cage, Jennifer Lawrence	Squeeze
Pros & Cons - Summer Family BBQs, Audience Artwork
275	July 14, 2010	Martha Stewart, Jack McBrayer	Paper Tongues ("Ride to California")
Twitter Song - Black Thought's Favorite Dinosaurs, Dancing on Air
276	July 15, 2010	Jennifer Love Hewitt, John Henson, Thierry Henry	Million Dollar Quartet
Remix the Clips, Ultimate Mustache Fighter 7 - Dr. Phil vs. Oates, Shots on Goal with Thierry Henry
277	July 16, 2010	Joseph Gordon-Levitt, Piper Perabo	Kurt Metzger
Thank You Notes, Say What!?
278	July 19, 2010	Horatio Sanz	Widespread Panic
Late Night Hashtags - #whydonttheymakethat, Freestylin' with the Roots, Horatio's Larry King Audition
279	July 20, 2010	Zach Braff, Jemaine Clement	Crowded House
Pros & Cons - Summer Camp, Mel Gibson Karaoke
280	July 21, 2010	Steve Carell, Selena Gomez	Halestorm
Obama Expressions, Audience Suggestion Box, BP Oil Spill Song
281	July 22, 2010	Kevin Connolly, Christina Hendricks	Sheryl Crow
Remix the Clips, And the Winner Is, Three-Point Shootout with Kevin Connolly
282	July 23, 2010	January Jones, Susie Essman	Rick Ross
Thank You Notes, Competitive Spit Takes, Beer Pong - January Jones
283	July 26, 2010	Kevin Kline, Chace Crawford	Hanson
He Said She Said, Wheel of Carpet Samples
284	July 27, 2010	Rachel Weisz, Chris Bosh	Angélique Kidjo featuring John Legend ("Move On Up")
Pros & Cons - The New Season of Jersey Shore, 7th Floor West - Episode 14, One on One with Chris Bosh
285	July 28, 2010	Luke Wilson, Tommy Davidson, Universal Record Database	Dierks Bentley
Late Night Hashtags - #ifihadasuperpower, Universal Record Attempts
286	July 29, 2010	50 Cent, Lucy Punch	Of Montreal featuring Solange ("Sex Karma")
Remix The Clips, Neil Young sings Double Rainbow
287	July 30, 2010	Paul Rudd, Jordana Spiro	Green Day ("Last of the American Girls")
Thank You Notes, Dance Your Hat And Gloves Off

=== August ===
No.	Original release date	Guest(s)	Musical/entertainment guest(s)
288	August 2, 2010	Kathy Griffin, Adam McKay	Trey Songz
New Velvet Elvises, Hubble Gotchu
289	August 3, 2010	Samuel L. Jackson, Giovanni Ribisi	Spoon
Pros & Cons - Shark Week, Put It In Reverse
290	August 4, 2010	Will Ferrell, Tim DeKay	Mike Posner ("Cooler Than Me")
Late Night Hashtags - #myparentsareweird, Jacob's Patience
291	August 5, 2010	Denis Leary, Connie Britton	Titus Andronicus
Remix the Clips, Summer Do Not Read List, Air Hockey - Jimmy vs. Denis Leary
292	August 6, 2010	Billy Crudup, J. B. Smoove	Step Up 3D Dancers
Thank You Notes, iPhone Apps, Late Night Golf Invitational with Billy Crudup
293	August 9, 2010	Jason Bateman, Kieran Culkin, China Chow	Menomena
Cell Phone Shootout
294	August 10, 2010	Dylan McDermott, Perez Hilton	Slayer
JetBlue Song - The Ballad of Steven Slater, Pros & Cons - Madden 2011, Perez Hilton's Found Footage of Steven Slater, Office Ukulele
295	August 11, 2010	Michael Cera, Landon Donovan	JP, Chrissie & the Fairground Boys
Late Night Hashtags - #thereshouldbealaw, JetBlue Song - The Ballad of Steven Slater, Ladysmith Snack (Theme Park) Mambazo - Six Flags, Late Night Charades with Michael Cera, FIFA Soccer 11 with Landon Donovan
296	August 12, 2010	Mickey Rourke, The Kids in the Hall	Walkmen
Remix the Clips, 7th Floor West - Episode 15
297	August 13, 2010	Gabourey Sidibe, Aubrey Plaza	Bobby Slayton
Thank You Notes, JetBlue Song - The Ballad of Steven Slater, Battle of the Instant Bands, Beer Pong - Gabourey Sidibe
298	August 30, 2010	The Best of Late Night with Jimmy Fallon	N/A
6-bee, The Best of Late, Robert Is Bothered, Head Swap, The Real Housewives of Late Night - Episode 5, Susan Boyle Reaction
299	August 31, 2010	Drew Barrymore, Snoop Dogg	Black Mountain
Pros & Cons - Hosting the Emmys, Let Us Play with Your Look, Total Iceholes

=== September ===
No.	Original release date	Guest(s)	Musical/entertainment guest(s)
300	September 1, 2010	Anna Wintour, Marc Jacobs, John Cena	Yo Gabba Gabba! ("Spirit of the Boogie")
Twitter Song - I Love Your Elbows, Competitive Spit Takes
301	September 2, 2010	Rachel Maddow, Jon Glaser	Heart
Play Guitar with Pavement Contest Announcement, Remix the Clips, Dance Your Hat and Gloves Off, Mixing Drinks with Rachel Maddow
302	September 3, 2010	Wendy Williams, Amber Riley	Never Shout Never
Thank You Notes, Freestylin' with the Roots, Ask Wendy
303	September 7, 2010	Ashley Tisdale, Margaret Cho	Robert Randolph and the Family Band ("Walk Don't Walk")
Pros & Cons - Football Season, At the Bar with Roger Federer
304	September 8, 2010	Elijah Wood, Maggie Q	Andy Haynes
Late Night Hashtags - #myroommateisweird, Do Not Read List, Stump Game with Elijah Wood
305	September 9, 2010	Ali Larter, Mario Batali	Jerry Lee Lewis
Remix the Clips, Put It in Reverse
306	September 10, 2010	Nathan Lane, Kris Jenner, Khloé Kardashian, Kim Kardashian	Chris Gethard
Thank You Notes, Kardashians Family Game
307	September 13, 2010	Christina Ricci, Robert Plant	Memphis
Video Vision - Sports Fan, Cell Phone Shootout
308	September 14, 2010	Justin Long, Tommy Hilfiger	Promises, Promises
Play Guitar with Pavement Contest Update, Pros & Cons - Freshmen Year in College, Dancing on Air
309	September 15, 2010	Regis Philbin, Emma Stone	American Idiot
Late Night Hashtags - #icantbelieveididthat, Shared Experiences, Regis Philbin Sings
310	September 16, 2010	Jon Hamm, Amy Ryan	Bloody Bloody Andrew Jackson
Remix the Clips, Name That Guy, Football Poker with Jon Hamm
311	September 17, 2010	Will Arnett, Jason Ritter	Patti LuPone
Thank You Notes, Late Night Golf Invitational with Will Arnett
312	September 20, 2010	Julianna Margulies, Cory Monteith	Superchunk
Monkey Shoot, Audience Suggestion Box, Musical Instrument Game - Fallon vs. Margulies
313	September 21, 2010	Tina Fey, Colin Hanks	Robert Plant, Band of Joy
Pros & Cons - Fall TV Premieres, Shout Outs, Late Night Charades - Fallon & Fey vs. Higgins & Hanks
314	September 22, 2010	Jeff Musial, Josh Brolin, Ben Rappaport	Kerry Simon
Late Night Hashtags - #ifihadonewish, Jeff Musial's Animals
315	September 23, 2010	Amy Poehler, Rashida Jones, Aaron Johnson	Pavement
Remix the Clips
316	September 24, 2010	Kristin Chenoweth, Super Grover 2.0	John Legend and The Roots
Slow Jam the News, Reflections with Justin Bieber, Thank You Notes
317	September 27, 2010	Susan Sarandon, Andrew Garfield	The Temper Trap
7th Floor West - FINALE, Models & Buckets
318	September 28, 2010	Christopher Meloni, JoAnna Garcia	Teenage Fanclub
Pros & Cons - The Gym, Freestyling with the Roots, Water War - Fallon vs. Meloni
319	September 29, 2010	Justin Timberlake, Jann Wenner	Belle and Sebastian
Late Night Hashtags - #worstjobieverhad, Tuba Gooding Jr. CD, History of Rap 1
320	September 30, 2010	Bryan Cranston, Jesse Eisenberg, Joshua Topolsky	The Vaselines
Remix the Clips, How You Like Me Now?

=== October ===
No.	Original release date	Guest(s)	Musical/entertainment guest(s)
321	October 1, 2010	Helen Mirren, Aaron Sorkin	Anthony Jeselnik
Thank You Notes, Audience Craigslist Items, Beer Pong - Fallon vs. Mirren
322	October 4, 2010	Morgan Freeman, Josh Lucas	Gayngs
He Said She Said, Teleprompter Limbo - Jersey Shore
323	October 5, 2010	Tom Selleck, Anthony Bourdain	Trace Adkins
Pros & Cons - 2010 MLB Postseason, Do Not Read List
324	October 6, 2010	Diane Lane, Peter Sagal, Carl Kasell	Fistful of Mercy
Late Night Hashtags - #mycoworkerisweird, Baby Bird, Total Iceholes
325	October 7, 2010	Jane Lynch, Emma Roberts	Pete Yorn
Remix the Clips, Wheel of Carpet Samples
326	October 8, 2010	Naomi Watts, Nick Swardson	Alton Brown
Thank You Notes, Battle of the Instant Bands
327	October 11, 2010	Donald Trump, Sam Rockwell	Brad
iPhone Apps, Photo Machine Match Game
328	October 12, 2010	Johnny Knoxville, Judah Friedlander	Everest
Pros & Cons - Obama's MTV Youth Town Hall Special, Ultimate Mustache Fighter 8 - Einstein vs. Richie
329	October 13, 2010	Whoopi Goldberg, Kevin O'Connor, Tom Silva, Richard Trethewey, Roger Cook	My Morning Jacket
Late Night Hashtags - #thatwouldbeawesome, Reflections with Justin Bieber
330	October 14, 2010	Steve-O, Pee-wee Herman, Nick Hornby, Joy Bryant	Ben Folds
Remix the Clips
331	October 15, 2010	Edward Norton, Bam Margera	Nick Vatterott
Thank You Notes, Tank Tops Talk Show
332	October 25, 2010	Molly Shannon, Paul Scheer	Norah Jones
Obama Expressions, Dance Your Hat & Gloves Off, Charades - Fallon vs. Shannon
333	October 26, 2010	Joan Rivers, Juliette Lewis	Underworld
Pros & Cons - Halloween Parties, Competitive Spit Takes
334	October 27, 2010	Alan Cumming, Donnie Wahlberg, Rich Little	School of Seven Bells
If Puppies Could Vote, Models & Buckets
335	October 28, 2010	Dana Carvey, Jason Hawes, Grant Wilson	Gwar
Remix the Clips, Head Swap
336	October 29, 2010	Laura Linney, Josh Charles	Ming Tsai
Thank You Notes, If Puppies Could Vote, Put It in Reverse, Elevator Dodgeball - Jimmy Fallon & Chris Canty vs. Josh Charles & Jon Hamm

=== November ===
No.	Original release date	Guest(s)	Musical/entertainment guest(s)
337	November 1, 2010	Jonah Hill, Russell Simmons	Jonathan Richman
If Puppies Could Vote, Shoutouts
338	November 3, 2010	Zach Galifianakis, Danny Boyle	Kid Cudi
Negative Puppy Ad, Late Night Hashtags - #voteforme, Jacob's Patience
339	November 4, 2010	Dr. Phil McGraw, Nina Dobrev	Duffy
Remix the Clips, Battle of the Instant Dance Crew, Microsoft Xbox Kinect Demo
340	November 5, 2010	Elvis Costello, Lewis Black	Elvis Costello
Thank You Notes, Buzzwords
341	November 8, 2010	Scarlett Johansson, Chris Morris	Toots & the Maytals
Suckers - Episode 1, Musical Instrument Game - Fallon vs. Johansson
342	November 9, 2010	Rosario Dawson, Ty Burrell	Rory Scovel
Pros & Cons - George W. Bush's Memoir, Do Not Read List, Total Iceholes - Fallon vs. Dawson
343	November 10, 2010	Rainn Wilson, Biz Stone, Evan Williams, Carla Gugino	Jónsi
Late Night Hashtags - #awwhellno, Charmed Scene Revisited
344	November 11, 2010	Jeff Goldblum, Mark Valley	Robyn
Remix the Clips, Cell Phone Shootout
345	November 12, 2010	Tracy Morgan, Dick Cavett	Kings of Leon
Slappington Manor, Thank You Notes, Won't You Pop My Balloon
346	November 15, 2010	Daniel Radcliffe, Quincy Jones	Grinderman
Video Vision - Preparing Thanksgiving, Name That Guy
347	November 16, 2010	Bruce Springsteen	N/A
Pros & Cons - Bruce Springsteen's Darkness on the Edge of Town, Neil Young - "Whip My Hair" by Willow
348	November 17, 2010	Amanda Peet, Peter Krause	Rascal Flatts
Late Night Hashtags - #slapyourself, Harry Potter Super Fan Contest
349	November 18, 2010	Anne Hathaway, Zachary Levi, Frank Shamrock	The Frames
Remix the Clips, Copy Machine Match Game
350	November 19, 2010	Jake Gyllenhaal, Scott Caan, Kelli Giddish	Sufjan Stevens
Thank You Notes, Banana Boyz & Jake Gyllenhaal - Sarah Palin Reality Show
351	November 22, 2010	David Hyde Pierce, Jimmie Johnson, Bobby Flay	Freddie Jackson
He Said She Said, Karate Pinata, Big Wheel Grand Prix
352	November 23, 2010	Jessica Simpson, Chris Christie	Regina Spektor
Pros & Cons - Holiday Travel, Audience Suggestion Box, Tic-Tac-Toe - Fallon vs. Simpson
353	November 24, 2010	Colin Firth, Fran Lebowitz	N.E.R.D
Late Night Hashtags - #myfamilyisweird, Letters Home
354	November 25, 2010	Bill Hader, Victoria Justice	James Otto, Ronnie Milsap
Thank You Notes, Freestyling with the Roots

=== December ===
No.	Original release date	Guest(s)	Musical/entertainment guest(s)
355	December 6, 2010	Martha Stewart, Gary Dell'Abate	R. Kelly
Reflections with Justin Bieber, Models & Buckets
356	December 7, 2010	Michael C. Hall, Busy Philipps	R. Kelly
Pros & Cons - Being a Mall Santa, Competitive Spit-Takes
357	December 8, 2010	Amy Adams, Mike Sorrentino	Adam Ferrara
12 Days of Christmas Sweaters Day 12, Late Night Hashtags - #keepyourpantson
358	December 9, 2010	Paul McCartney, Nick Cannon	N/A
12 Days of Christmas Sweaters Day 11
359	December 10, 2010	Kirsten Dunst, Dee Snider	Maroon 5
12 Days of Christmas Sweaters Day 10, Thank You Notes
360	December 13, 2010	Jessica Alba, Colin Quinn	Stephen Bishop
12 Days of Christmas Sweaters Day 9, Battle of the Instant Dance Crews, PS3 Uncharted Demo
361	December 14, 2010	Bette Midler, Mario Batali, Rula Jebreal	Pegi Young
12 Days of Christmas Sweaters Day 8, Pros & Cons - Office Holiday Parties, John Bainer Press Conference
362	December 15, 2010	Ben Stiller, Mike Mizanin	Annie Lennox
Slow Jam the News, 12 Days of Christmas Sweaters Day 7, Charades - Fallon & Ben Stiller vs. Anne Meara & Jerry Stiller
363	December 16, 2010	Paul Rudd, Jon Lovitz	Aloe Blacc
12 Days of Christmas Sweaters Day 6, Late Night & Late Late Show Gift Exchange, Drunk on Christmas Song
364	December 17, 2010	Jeff Bridges, Blythe Danner	Robert Plant & Band of Joy
12 Days of Christmas Sweaters Day 5, Thank You Notes, Cellphone Shootout
365	December 20, 2010	Jason Segel, Hailee Steinfeld, Joshua Topolsky	Dr. Elmo
12 Days of Christmas Sweaters Day 4, Robert Is Bothered, Rockapella
305F5F	December 21, 2010	Jack Black, Stephen Dorff	The Roots
12 Days of Christmas Sweaters Day 3, Late Night Hashtags - #hohohellno, Jack Black singing "Holy Diver", Little Drummer Boy
367	December 22, 2010	Ethan Hawke, Gillian Jacobs	José Feliciano
Head Swap, 12 Days of Christmas Sweaters Day 2, Topical Carolers
368	December 23, 2010	James Earl Jones, Dave Attell	Aaron Neville
12 Days of Christmas Sweaters Day 1, Remix the Clips
