= Joe Santagato =

American vlogger and podcaster

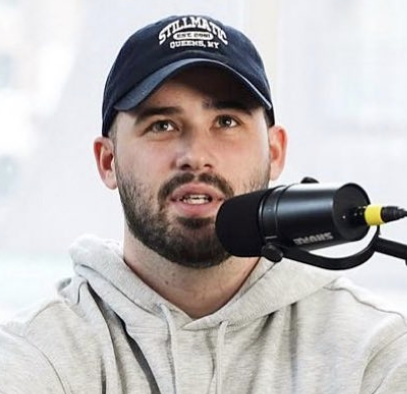
- Santagato in 2023
- Born: Joseph Patrick Santagato; February 25, 1992 (age 34); New York City, United States
- Occupations: YouTuber; comedian; vlogger; podcaster

YouTube information
- Channels: Joe Santagato; Santagato Studios; The Basement Yard
- Years active: 2010–present
- Genre: Comedy
- Subscribers: 5.4 million (combined)
- Views: 974 million (combined)
- Last updated: April 7, 2026

Joseph Patrick Santagato (born February 25, 1992) is an American YouTuber, podcaster and comedian. He is a co-host of the podcasts The Basement Yard and Other People's Lives with Frank Alvarez. He is also the founder of the YouTube-based video production company Santagato Studios and the host and executive producer of the Hot Ones spin-off series Hot Ones: Game Night.

== Early life ==
Joe Santagato was born and raised in Astoria, Queens, New York, United States. He is of maternal Irish descent and paternal Italian descent. His mother, Elizabeth, was a public school secretary and his father, Joseph, was a firefighter for the New York City Fire Department. He has three older siblings, Thomas, Shannon and Keith. Thomas is a former Team USA athlete and national skeleton champion, and Keith had a gaming YouTube channel from 2015 to 2017 with over 100,000 subscribers.

Santagato attended the St. Francis of Assisi Catholic School, Louis Armstrong Middle School, and St. Francis Preparatory School. Santagato later attended Queensborough Community College but dropped out, instead working as a pizza delivery boy and waiter while growing his YouTube channel.

Santagato began to produce video content at the age of 13, focusing on short movies, sketches and song parodies. He joined YouTube after a suggestion from a friend to post videos online, using the moniker SantagatoTV.

Santagato has credited comedians like George Carlin, Richard Pryor, and Robin Williams as his major comedic influences. He has also named Jenna Marbles as an early influence on his YouTube channel.

== Career ==
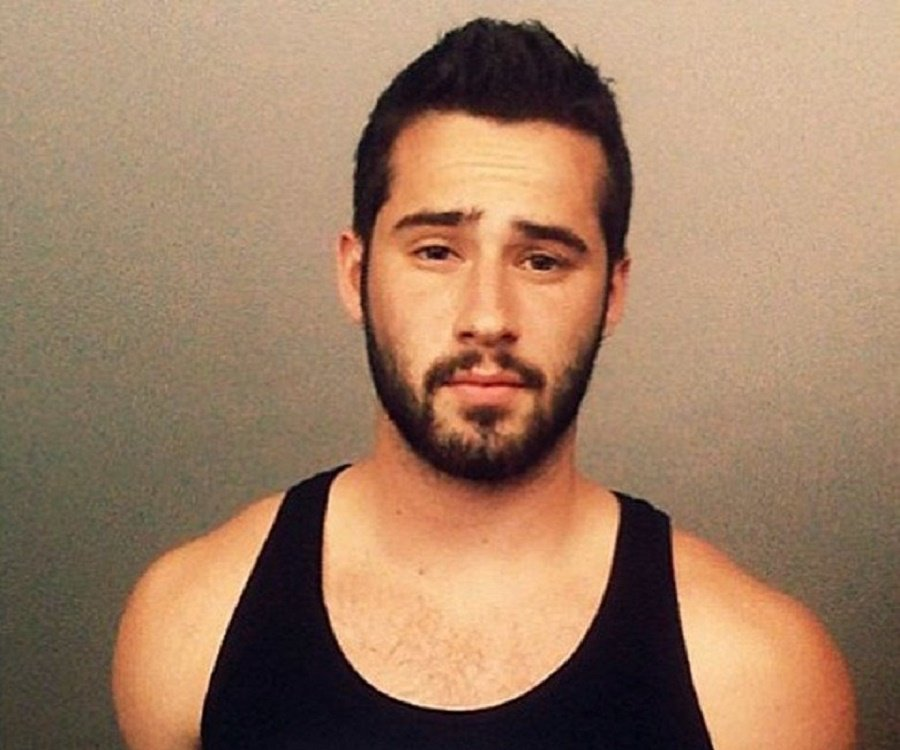
Santagato in 2018

Before pursuing YouTube full-time, Santagato worked as a producer and editor for American online news platform Elite Daily, as well as appearing on MTV’s Guy Court. At this time, Santagato had a YouTube channel titled SantagatoTV and a popular self-titled Vine account. From 2013 to 2015, he was a part of the Youtuber comedy collective Settle Down Kids. In May 2014, he renamed his YouTube channel to the current "Joe Santagato". His Vine account went inactive in 2016 when Vine permanently ended uploads.

In 2016, Santagato collaborated with actor and wrestler The Rock in their YouTube show titled Rock The Promo.

In August 2016, Santagato helped to create the Hasbro board game Speak Out in which players recite phrases with a dental retractor placed in their mouth while other players try to guess the phrase which is being said. The game is based on Santagato's Watch Ya' Mouth series. Santagato worked with Hasbro to help promote the game on their social media. Hasbro has also released Speak Out: Joe Santagato Edition, which contains phrases written by Santagato, and is more explicit than the original version. Santagato is also a promoter of Hasbro's Hearing Things board game, based on Santagato's Whad'ya Say series, in which headphones are placed on one player's ears, and another player recites phrases while the first player guesses the phrase based on lip movement.

In 2021, Santagato and Greg Dybec launched a new trivia party game called Pay The Price. Their kickstarter amassed over $120,000 from over 3,000 backers. In 2022, Santagato and Dybec released an everything-bagel hot sauce with Heatonist through their brand, Secret Handshake Food Co. Santagato also has a podcast with Dybec titled Other People's Lives, which has 339,000 YouTube subscribers as of March 2026.

=== The Basement Yard ===
In 2015, Santagato created a weekly podcast titled The Basement Yard. Originally an audio-only podcast, a video version was created for the streaming service Fullscreen in 2017. Comedian Danny LoPriore joined as co-host in 2018. LoPriore left the podcast in 2020 to pursue other ventures, and Santagato’s childhood friend Frank Alvarez subsequently joined as co-host. As of April 2026, The Basement Yard has 1,300,000 subscribers on YouTube and 114,000 supporters on Patreon.

In 2024, Santagato and Alvarez began a tour of The Basement Yard doing live shows. In 2025, they launched another set of shows titled "From the Basement to the World".

=== Awards ===
Throughout his online career, Santagato has received recognition from audiences and media outlets for his work in podcasting as well as digital media. On October 30, 2025, People (magazine) announced that Santagato and Alvarez had won the Sexiest Podcasters category in their annual Sexiest Man Alive 2025 Readers' Choice Poll. In addition, on March 16, 2026, The Basement Yard won Best Overall Ensemble at the 2026 iHeartPodcast Awards, where it had also been nominated for Best Comedy Podcast.

== Personal life ==
Santagato maintains a close relationship with several of his childhood friends, many of whom have appeared in his videos, most notably Frank Alvarez, who has co-hosted Santagato's podcast The Basement Yard since 2020.
