= Bustle (magazine) =

American women's magazine

- Screenshot of Bustle on April 7, 2025
- Editor-in-chief: Charlotte Owen
- Categories: Women's
- Founded: August 2013; 13 years ago
- Company: Bustle Digital Group
- Country: United States
- Based in: 315 Park Ave South Floor 11; New York City, New York 10010
- Language: English
- Website: bustle.com

Bustle is an online American women's magazine founded in August 2013 by Bryan Goldberg. It positions news and politics alongside articles about beauty, celebrities, and fashion trends. By September 2016, the website had 50 million monthly readers.

== History ==
Bustle logo before 2020 redesign

Bustle was founded by Bryan Goldberg in 2013. Previously, Goldberg co-founded the website Bleacher Report with a single million-dollar investment. He claimed that "women in their 20s have nothing to read on the Internet." Bustle was launched with $6.5 million in backing from Seed and Series A funding rounds.

Bustle surpassed 10 million monthly unique visitors in July 2014, placing it ahead of rival women-oriented sites such as Refinery29, Rookie and xoJane; it had the second greatest number of unique visitors after Gawker's Jezebel.

By July 2015, Bustle had 46 full-time editorial staff. That October, it launched the parenting sister site Romper. By that point, Bustle was receiving 31.6 million unique visitors per month, and it had 200 part-time contributors and 40 full-time editors.

In September 2016, Bustle launched a redesign using the company's $11.5 million series D funding round. At that time, the site had over 70 full-time editors and 250 contract contributors who posted more than 200 articles daily.

In April 2019, Kate Ward resigned as editor-in-chief. She had worked at Bustle since 2013. Emma Rosenblum replaced Ward in June 2019.

== Content model ==
In 2013, The New Yorker reported that Goldberg planned to hire writers from Bustle's target demographic (young women between 18 and 34) instead of professional writers. It noted, "He hopes that, by gradually hiring hundreds of these writers and asking them to 'create the content that interests them,' the Web site will become 'an accurate representation' of the larger demographic." That year, Ward and her colleagues utilised the Bleacher Report's contributor model to increase traffic. The Business of Fashion wrote, "Under the approach, a vast network of writers did around-the-clock shifts for low hourly wages to deliver a quota of blog posts that often capitalised on trending Google terms to attract clicks."

== Bustle Digital Group ==
=== Formation ===
On April 17, 2017, DMG Media (publishers of the British tabloid The Daily Mail) announced that it had sold Elite Daily to the newly rebranded Bustle Digital Group.

=== Sales and acquisitions ===
Goldberg said that the acquisition was done in part to increase Bustle's original video content, which generated an average of 10 million monthly views, compared to Elite Daily's average of 60 million monthly views.

Bustle Digital Group purchased the inactive website Gawker in July 2018. Bustle Digital Group bought the events website Flavorpill, owner of Flavorwire, in August 2018. On November 29, 2018, Mic CEO Chris Altchek announced Mic was laying off most of Mic's staff while working on a deal to sell Mic. The next day, a Bustle representative confirmed that Bustle Digital Group had acquired Mic.

In March 2019, Bustle Digital Group purchased The Outline, followed by The Zoe Report in May 2019. They also purchased Nylon in June 2019, with the intention to publish print magazines under the Nylon brand name. Rather than monthly publications, the magazines will be published around large cultural events, like the Coachella music festival. In July, Bustle Digital acquired Inverse, a science and culture site.

In April 2020, BDG fired the staff of The Outline.

In 2021, BDG acquired Some Spider, parent of Scary Mommy and Fatherly.

In February 2023, BDG shut down Gawker. In November of that year, Gawker was sold to Meng Ru Kuok, of the Singapore-based Caldecott Music Group.
