= Bryan Goldberg =

American entrepreneur (born 1983)

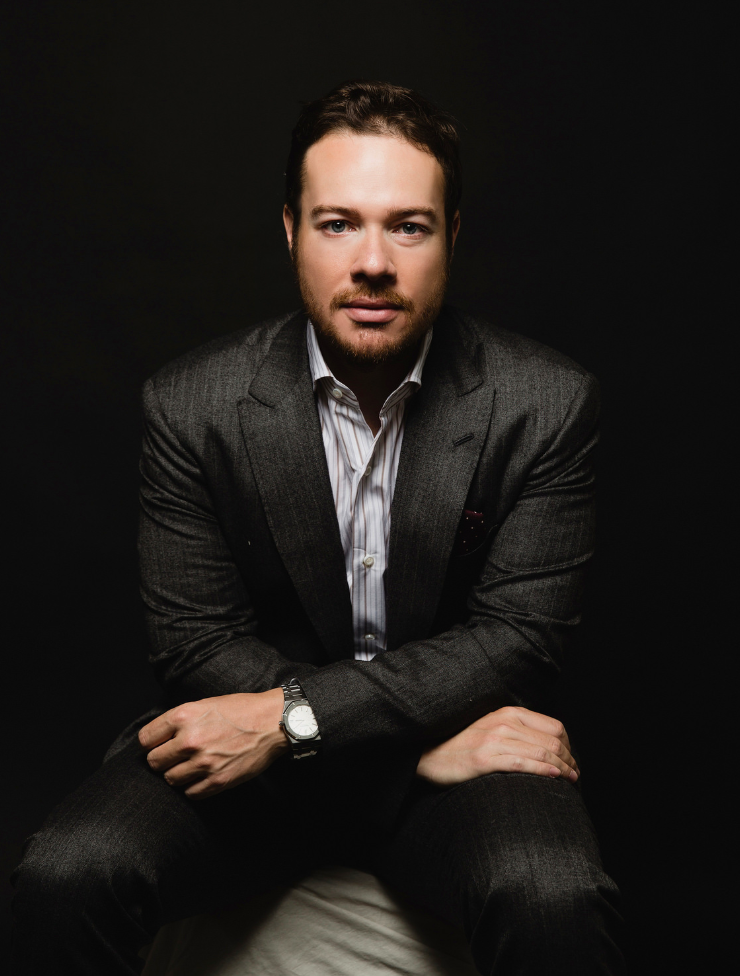
- Goldberg in 2018
- Born: Bryan David Goldberg; June 29, 1983 (age 43); Los Altos, California, U.S.
- Education: Middlebury College
- Occupations: CEO and Co-founder of Bustle
- Known for: Founder of Bleacher Report; Founder and CEO of Bustle
- Website: bustle.com, bustle.company

Bryan David Goldberg (born June 29, 1983) is an American entrepreneur and the owner of Bustle Digital Group, which operates a number of media properties, including Bustle, Nylon, W Magazine and Gawker. Previously, Goldberg founded Bleacher Report, a sports news website that sold to Turner Broadcasting System in 2012 for $200 million.

Bryan Goldberg is widely considered to be a polarizing figure in New York media. He has been described as the “buyer of last resort” for his hard-nosed deal-making tactics, and a “media mogul” by The New Yorker.

== Early life ==
Goldberg grew up in Los Altos, California. His father was a technology executive who worked at Atari and Quantum and his mother was a homemaker. He earned his undergraduate degree from Middlebury College, where he studied economics and Japanese. He briefly worked as an investment banker at Credit Suisse, and later worked as an analyst at Deloitte Consulting.

== Career ==
Goldberg founded Bleacher Report in 2007 with David Finocchio, Alexander Freund, and David Nemetz, who were friends from middle school. Though not an engineer by training, Goldberg took on most of the technical tasks related to the sports news website. Bleacher Report quickly became a competitor to traditional sports news media such as ESPN and Sports Illustrated. It drew huge audiences with its high volume of content and slideshows. The company also launched the Team Stream app and ultimately surpassed ESPN as the largest sports network for mobile and social media.

In 2012 the site was acquired for $200 million by Turner Broadcasting System. After the sale, Goldberg and his cofounders took all 160 employees on a trip to Las Vegas.

Goldberg left Bleacher Report in 2013 to found Bustle, a women’s interest website. In preparation, he interviewed hundreds of women about what they thought was missing from traditional publications such as Glamour and Cosmopolitan. While the launch was met with criticism, Bustle has grown to 31.2 million readers, nearly half being the desirable demographic of women under 34. It combines soft news with more about politics, business, and government.

In April 2017, Goldberg and his company acquired Elite Daily, a millennial-focused site, from the Daily Mail and rebranded it as Bustle Digital Group.

In March 2018, Goldberg purchased The Zoe Report from celebrity style icon Rachel Zoe. She subsequently became a partner in his Bustle Digital Group venture.

In July 2018, Goldberg purchased the rights to Gawker at a bankruptcy auction. The popular site had previously been forced into closure after being sued by professional wrestler Hulk Hogan. Gawker’s auction was the subject of great media attention, and Goldberg’s initial refusal to state his plans for the site made him the subject of intense speculation. He subsequently announced plans to relaunch Gawker in early 2019, but later paused the project.

In November 2018, Goldberg purchased Mic.com for a reported price of under $10 million—a sharp discount from the nearly $100 million that the company had been worth only a year prior. Goldberg cited his desire to expand Bustle Digital Group further into News and Politics, a move that was criticized by the Mic Union after widespread corporate layoffs.

In July 2019, Goldberg acquired Nylon, an alternative fashion and music publication with a focus in experiential marketing. Though the magazine had previously exited print, Goldberg promised to resume publishing the magazine.

In August 2020, Goldberg pushed further into fashion by partnering with celebrities Karlie Kloss, Kaia Gerber, and Lewis Hamilton to acquire W Magazine. The luxury fashion magazine had previously been part of Conde Nast.

To date, the company has raised $80 million in venture capital funding and has been valued at just over $200 million.

== Napoleon's hat ==
Bryan Goldberg purchased the hat owned and worn by Emperor Napoleon Bonaparte at a Sotheby’s auction in November, 2021 for a price of $1,400,000. He told the New York Post that “I can’t believe the price I got” on the historical object given its rarity and good condition. Previously, the hat had been owned by Scottish nobles descended from Sir Michael Shaw-Stewart, who purchased the hat in 1814 and was acquainted with Bonaparte’s family.

Goldberg said that he intends to lend the hat to a museum, but also plans to wear it at formal occasions and possibly at his wedding.
