= Caity Weaver =

American journalist, humorist, and writer

- Occupation: Journalist
- Years active: 2011–present
- Employer: The Atlantic
- Website: https://www.caity.info/

Caity Weaver is an American journalist, humorist, and writer at The Atlantic. Previously she wrote for The New York Times, GQ magazine and Gawker, and contributed to Mental Floss.

== Career ==
In 2011, Weaver joined Gawker, shortly after she graduated from the University of Pennsylvania. With her irreverent write-ups on celebrity news and restaurant reviews, she became one of the site's most popular writers. She won critical acclaim in September 2014 for writing a 6,000-word feature article, "My 14-Hour Search for the End of TGI Friday's Endless Appetizers", about a 14-hour all-you-can-eat mozzarella sticks binge at T.G.I. Friday's. In January 2015, she was promoted to senior editor at Gawker.

In October 2015, Weaver joined the staff of GQ, writing about arts and entertainment for the publication. Her feature article about Kim Kardashian in 2016 brought GQ its "two biggest days of online traffic in the publication’s history — a million unique views when the story went live on June 16 and more than two million views over 36 hours."

In 2016, Brooklyn Magazine named Weaver one of Brooklyn's "50 Funniest People".

Weaver joined the Styles desk at the New York Times in March 2018. She then joined the New York Times Magazine in February 2022.

In January 2025, she joined The Atlantic as a staff writer.

== Personal life ==
Weaver lives in New Mexico.
