= Emily Gould =

American author

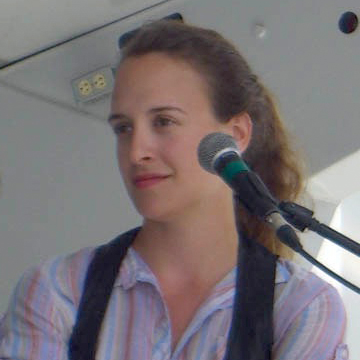
- Gould in 2009
- Born: October 13, 1981 (age 45); Silver Spring, Maryland, U.S.
- Occupations: Writer; editor; blogger
- Writing career
- Genres: Fiction, non-fiction
- Website: emilygould.com

Emily Gould (born October 13, 1981) is an American author, novelist and blogger who worked as an editor at Gawker. She has written several short stories and novels and is the co-owner, with fellow writer Ruth Curry, of the independent e-bookstore Emily Books.

== Education ==
Gould graduated from Eugene Lang College after attending Kenyon College.

== Career ==
Gould began her blogging career as one half of The Universal Review before starting her own blog, Emily Magazine, and writing for Gawker on a freelance basis. Before joining the Gawker staff, Gould was an associate editor at Disney's Hyperion imprint. Gould's work for Gawker eventually attracted media attention from several publications including The New York Times, as well as significant controversy. She left Gawker in November 2007.

Gould is the co-author, with Zareen Jaffery, of the young-adult novel Hex Education, which was released by Penguin's Razorbill imprint in May 2007. She is also the author of a collection of essays, And the Heart Says Whatever, published by Free Press in May 2010. Her semi-autobiographical novel Friendship was published by Farrar, Straus and Giroux (2014).

Gould is the co-owner, with fellow writer Ruth Curry, of the independent e-bookstore Emily Books. Emily Books has a publishing imprint with Coffee House Press.

== Controversies ==
=== Gawker Stalker and Jimmy Kimmel ===
On April 6, 2007, Gould appeared on an episode of Larry King Live hosted by talk show host Jimmy Kimmel during a panel discussion titled "Paparazzi: Do they go too far?" During the interview, Kimmel accused Gould of irresponsible journalism resulting from Gould's popular blog and the "Gawker Stalker" feature, which allowed users to update the whereabouts of celebrities in New York City. Kimmel mentioned the possibility of assisting real stalkers, adding that Gould and her website could ultimately be responsible for someone's death, and that Gawker.com's content was frequently untruthful. Gould stated that the section of the website represented "citizen journalism" and went on to say that no one expected everything in the section to be true. The interview attracted media attention and resulted in an overwhelmingly negative response for Gould.

On May 4, 2007, Gould reacted to the interview in an op-ed she wrote for The New York Times. A lengthy article she wrote about her experiences with Gawker.com was the New York Times Magazine cover story on May 25, 2008. In it, she described how the negative response to her television appearance caused her to suffer panic attacks, which led her to seek therapy. In a March 2020 article, Gould recounts the incident and discusses the concept of shame in relation to it.

=== Lena Dunham feud ===
Gould has also attracted criticism and controversy for her public feud with the actor and writer Lena Dunham. In her novel Friendship, Gould discussed an evening she spent with Dunham when they met at a dinner party hosted by a mutual friend who lives in the same Brooklyn Heights building as Dunham. Gould mentioned how Dunham's success made her jealous and spoke about the encounter in several media interviews during the promotion of Friendship. Girls showrunner Jennifer Konner later posted several negative tweets in response to Gould's article in The New York Times. Dunham unfollowed Gould on Twitter and, according to Gould, direct-messaged her saying, "you fully suck, I was going to promote your book but you need to get a better talk show story," referring to Gould having spoken about her on talk shows and in interviews.

In an interview with The Huffington Post, Gould revealed that she was "very upset" about the public fallout with Dunham and that she remains "a big fan" of hers. Gould later wrote an article for Salon defending Dunham against sexual-abuse accusations stemming from accounts Dunham gave in her essay collection Not That Kind of Girl.

== Personal life ==
Gould is from a Jewish family, and has been married to the novelist Keith Gessen since October 2014. They live in Brooklyn, New York. In 2022, she was diagnosed with bipolar disorder. She has celiac disease.

== Works ==
- Hex Education. Illustrator Zareen Jaffery, Razorbill, 2007, ISBN 9781595141187
- And the Heart Says Whatever. Simon and Schuster. 4 May 2010. ISBN 978-1-4391-3734-5.
- Friendship: A Novel. Farrar, Straus and Giroux. 1 July 2014. ISBN 978-0-374-71089-7.
- Perfect Tunes (Simon & Schuster, 2020)
