= Joshua Topolsky =

American technology journalist (b.1977)

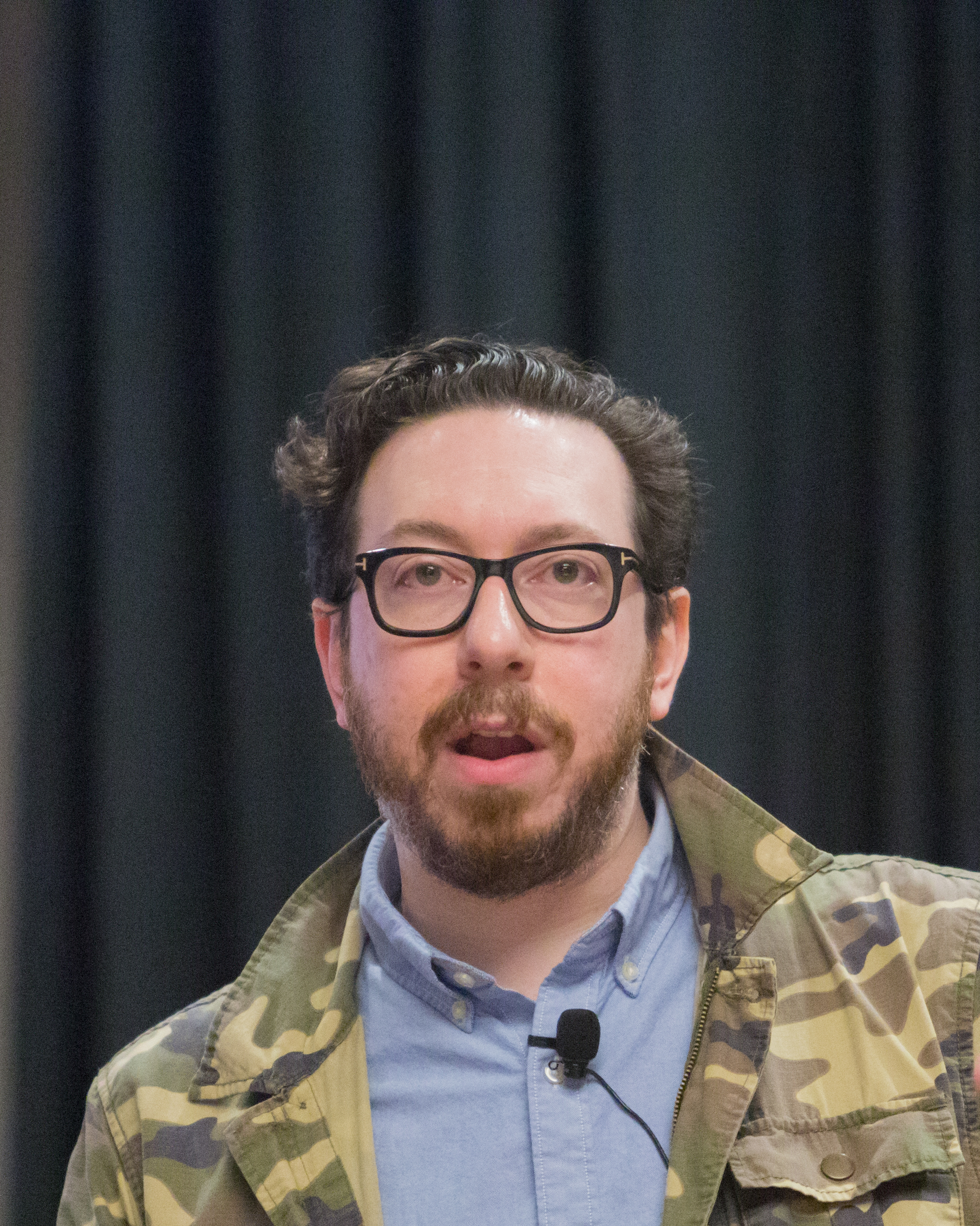
- Topolsky at SXSW in 2017
- Born: Joshua Ryan Topolsky; October 19, 1977 (age 49); Pittsburgh, Pennsylvania, U.S.
- Occupation: Journalist
- Known for: Engadget, This Is My Next, The Verge, The Outline
- Spouse: Laura June

Joshua Ryan Topolsky (born October 19, 1977) is an American technology journalist. He is also a record producer, and DJ under the stage name Joshua Ryan. Topolsky was the co-founder and editor-in-chief of technology news network The Verge, and a co-creator of its parent company Vox Media. Previously, he was the editor-in-chief of Engadget.

On August 4, 2014, Topolsky stepped down from The Verge and Vox Media to join Bloomberg "as the editor of a series of new online ventures it is introducing as part of a revamped journalism strategy". He left Bloomberg in July 2015 after clashes with Michael Bloomberg over the direction of its digital media strategy and started the digital news company The Outline.

== Journalism ==
Between August 2008 and March 2011, Topolsky was the editor-in-chief of the technology blog Engadget. Since 2009, he has been the technology correspondent for NBC's Late Night with Jimmy Fallon, and then The Tonight Show Starring Jimmy Fallon. In March 2011, he resigned his position at Engadget.

Following his departure from Engadget, Topolsky began a new site called This Is My Next, a temporary home for him and his ex-Engadget colleagues as they built a new technology network. Like Engadget, the website included a wide variety of technology news, reviews, and editorials. The website name is a play on a phrase Topolsky often says when reviewing a device that he especially likes (e.g. "This is my next phone."). Topolsky's team at This Is My Next included former Engadget editors and contributors including Paul Miller, Nilay Patel, Joanna Stern, Chris Ziegler, and others.

On July 18, 2011, Topolsky announced on Late Night that he and his team were developing a new permanent network called The Verge. The Verge launched on November 1, 2011, with Topolsky as the founding editor-in-chief. He appeared in many of the early audio and video podcasts that the site released while writing articles. He also appeared on Fallon's shows several times after the announcement of the site with products the site reviewed that he also showcased to the audience.

The New York Times reported on July 24, 2014, that Topolsky would be leaving The Verge on August 4, 2014, to pursue an editorial position at Bloomberg. The Times noted, "He will develop and run Bloomberg’s new ventures, which will cover specific topic areas such as politics and luxury."

The New York Times reported on July 10, 2015, that Topolsky would be leaving Bloomberg Business after clashes with founder Michael Bloomberg. This follows a radical redesign of Bloomberg Business web properties.

In April 2015, Topolsky started Tomorrow, a weekly podcast about current trends in technology, news, and culture. Each episode of Tomorrow features cohost Ryan Houlihan and a special guest, ranging from Google designer Matías Duarte to Topolsky's wife.

In 2016, Topolsky pursued initial funding for a new digital media outlet. The company is titled Independent Media and launched its first publication, The Outline, on December 5.

In 2023, Topolsky was hired by Robinhood to launch Sherwood Media, a website dedicated to "deliver[ing] actionable, illuminating news on the markets, business, tech, and the culture of money in a way that's authoritative, engaging, and speaks in the language of this moment". As of 2025 Topolsky is Sherwood's editor-in-chief and president.

== Music ==
Under the stage name Joshua Ryan, Topolsky was a well known trance music DJ whose tracks were included on several gold certified compilation albums. His tracks have been licensed by Palm Pictures, Moonshine Music, Ministry of Sound, and Sony Music Entertainment (UK). In 1999, Fragrant Records released his single "Pistolwhip", which was re-released on NuLife Recordings in 2001 and reached number 29 on the UK Singles Chart. Topolsky and his brother Eric Emm are known as the producing duo The Brothers.

== Personal life ==
Topolsky lives outside New York with his wife, Laura June and their daughter. His wife was also an editor at The Verge and now writes for various publications such as The Awl and Jezebel. Topolsky was raised in a Jewish family.

== Discography ==
=== Solo work ===
- "Hush" / "Doinyourheadin" – Slinkey Recordings 1997
- "Don't Look Back" – Slinkey Recordings 1998
- "Pistolwhip" – Fragrant Music 1999
- "Pistolwhip" – NuLife Recordings 2000
- "Thunderclap" – Fragrant Music 2000
- "Unreal" – Crush Recordings 2000
- "All" / "Ison" – System Recordings 2001
- "Buildings in Between" – System Recordings 2003
- "Buildings in Between" (remixes) – System Recordings 2003
- "By Design" – System Recordings 2003
- "Fury" – System Recordings 2003
- "Damage" – Alpha Numeric 2004
- "Blueness" – System Recordings 2005

=== Remixes ===
- Tanlines / Brothers (Joshua Ryan Remix)

== See also ==
- The Outline
