= Universal Records (1995−2006) =

US record label

- Parent company: Universal Music Group
- Founded: 1995; 31 years ago (as Rising Tide Records; first incarnation); 2025; 1 year ago (second incarnation)
- Founder: Doug Morris; Daniel Glass
- Defunct: 2006; 20 years ago (first incarnation)
- Status: Active
- Distributors: Republic Records; (In the US); UMG; (Outside the US); Universal Music Enterprises (Reissues)
- Genre: Various
- Country of origin: U.S.
- Location: New York City, U.S.
- Official website: universalrecords.com

Universal Records is a record label owned by Universal Music Group and operated as part of the Universal Motown Republic Group. The label became dormant in 2006, due to Universal Motown and Universal Republic Records being restructured, which also funneled the existing artists from Universal Records. In 2025, Universal Records was reactivated.

== History ==
Founded in 1995 as Rising Tide Records, the label would ultimately begin to thrive the following year when its name was changed to Universal Records to complement the branding overhaul of the Universal Studios structure since MCA Inc. was purchased from Matsushita Electric (now Panasonic) by Seagram. The label was created by former Universal Music Group chairman and CEO Doug Morris and Daniel Glass (founder of Glassnote Records), who became its president.

In 1996, to complement the MCA renaming into Universal, MCA Music Entertainment Group was also rebranded into what is known today as Universal Music Group. With that in place, Universal Records was to operate under the newly renamed UMG banner.

Universal Records had success in breaking new artists, including the multi-platinum debut of Erykah Badu, Billie Myers, Goldfinger, Akon and the Lost Boyz. Glass formed relationships with independent record labels such as Kedar Entertainment and Mojo Records. Universal also brought in and took over Uptown Records following founder Andre Harrell's departure. Following Heavy D's dropping from the imprint in 1997, Universal folded Uptown in 1999.

New Orleans, Louisiana based record company Cash Money Records, led by Ronald "Slim" Williams and Bryan "Baby/Birdman" Williams, signed a three-year $30 million distribution deal with Universal Records in March 1998. Under the terms of the deal, the Williams were given a $3 million advance each year and a credit of $1.5 million for each of the up to six artists that they had at the time. After recouping, Universal Records would retain 15% of profits from album sales, while Cash Money retained 85% as well as ownership of all master recordings. Cash Money's first success under Universal was Juvenile's November 1998 release, 400 Degreez. Peaking in the top 10 on the Billboard 200, the album would ultimately go on to be certified quadruple platinum in America. Cash Money and Universal also launched Lil Wayne's career with his November 1999 album Tha Block Is Hot, which was a top three Billboard 200 album and later certified platinum in America.

On December 10, 1998, Seagram completed its seven-month $10.6 billion plan to acquire PolyGram, merging its music division of labels with UMG, helping both divisions combine operations together under the biggest music recording company. On New Year's Eve 1998, Universal Records was pooled together with then-PolyGram label Motown Records and fellow MCA label Republic Records to form Universal Motown Republic Group; Motown was previously brought under UMG during its preceding days as MCA Inc. It was a subsidiary of MCA Records and minority-owned by Boston Ventures until 1991. To start the New Year in 1999, Universal Motown Republic Group became one of the three new music units under UMG alongside Interscope Geffen A&M Records and The Island Def Jam Music Group.

In 2001, after the absorption of Priority Records into EMI, New Orleans based company No Limit Records was signed a distribution deal with Universal and renamed "The New No Limit". However, this deal failed as various releases by Master P, Romeo, 504 Boyz and Choppa did not meet commercial expectations. No Limit cut ties with Universal in 2004, a year after filing for bankruptcy.

Bad Boy Entertainment, founded by Sean "P. Diddy" Combs, signed a three-year marketing and distribution deal with Universal Records in February 2003, following its departure from Arista Records. Universal and Bad Boy released Da Band's September 2003 album, Too Hot for TV. The album was ultimately certified gold by the Recording Industry Association of America. Albums under this deal that followed include the soundtrack to Bad Boys II, Loon's self-titled album, Carl Thomas' Let's Talk About It, Mario Winans' Hurt No More and New Edition's One Love. In 2005, Bad Boy switched distribution from Universal to Atlantic Records before the deal could be fulfilled.

The label later had more success with acts like 3 Doors Down, 98 Degrees, Chamillionaire, Godsmack, Mushroomhead, Flaw, Hatebreed, Lifer, 4LYN, I Mother Earth, Jack Johnson, Juvenile, Nelly, Big Sha, Lil Wayne, and Mika. In the summer of 2004, Universal had a big success with Terror Squad's single, "Lean Back", which debuted at number one on the Billboard Hot 100 that August.

By 2005, Universal was reaching its downfall, even though Cash Money kept its prophecy leading, but its success was short-lived. On New Year's Eve 2005, Universal Records was merged with Republic Records to become Universal Republic Records. Motown (as a standalone label) was renamed Universal Motown Records. Therefore, artists under Motown, as well as hip hop and R&B acts under Universal were combined together under Universal Motown, with the rest being transferred to Universal Republic, which would later be reverted back to Republic Records in 2012, a year after Universal Motown was changed back to Motown, which itself would be moved to Island Def Jam. As a result, the Universal Motown Republic Group was disbanded in the summer of 2011 during a reorganization at Universal Music Group, which was under the leadership of Lucian Grainge.

It was also the distributor of Polydor and Island UK in the United States. Distribution switched to Interscope Geffen A&M Records and Republic Records respectively after the label's dissolution. Island's operation in the United Kingdom, in 2013, would be absorbed into Virgin EMI Records, which, itself, would be rebranded in 2020 as EMI Records, taking over distribution for Republic UK.

As of December 2023, Universal Records is currently inactive as its artists would later be drafted to Republic Records. Motown is currently under the Interscope Capitol Labels Group, which it has been a part of since 2014 following another UMG disbandment of the Island Def Jam Music Group. Therefore, reissues of releases under the Universal Records, Universal Republic or Universal Motown names will be handled by Republic and Motown respectively on behalf of Universal Music Enterprises.

There have been unrelated labels in Europe and the Philippines, taking the "Universal Records" name. Because of an unrelated label in the Philippines owning the rights to the Universal Records name in that country, parent company Universal Music Group did business there as MCA Music, Inc., using UMG's former name. In 2021, MCA Music was renamed UMG Philippines.

In 2025, Universal Records was reactivated, releasing Rob Thomas' sixth studio album, All Night Days.

== Affiliated labels ==
Affiliated labels included Celtic Heartbeat Records, co-founded by U2 manager Paul McGuinness. formerly affiliated with Atlantic Records, and Universal Motown Republic Group (UMRG). Bill Whelan's Riverdance was Celtic Heartbeat's first album to sell more than a million copies.

== See also ==
- Universal Records artists
- List of record labels
