= List of Universal Records artists =

This is a list of current, and former, artists for American label Universal Records of Universal Motown Republic Group, or one of its associated labels. An asterisk (*) denotes an artist who no longer records for the label.

Note: Universal Records is not to be confused with global parent company Universal Music Group, the world's largest company in the recording industry, and any of its labels.

== 0-9 ==
- 504 Boyz (The New No Limit/Universal)
- 112 (OneTwelve/The Inc./Universal)
- 2 Pistols (Cash Money)
- 3 Doors Down (Republic/Universal)
- 98 Degrees
- 10 Years

== A ==
- Akon
- Aaliyah (Blackground/Universal)
- Acroma*
- Afroman*
- AHMIR
- Ali & Gipp
- Alien Ant Farm
- Alter Bridge
- Anastacia
- Anberlin
- Ashley Parker Angel (Blackground/Universal)
- Angels & Airwaves
- Asher Roth
- Ashanti (Universal)
- Arab (Sod Money Gang)
- Aubrey O'Day (SRC/Universal)
- Ariana Grande (Republic/Universal)
- Austin Mahone

== B ==
- Merril Bainbridge (Gotham/Universal)
- David Banner (SRC/Universal)
- Baby A.K.A. Birdman (Cash Money/Universal)
- Baby Bash*
- Baby Boy Da Prince (Republic/Universal)
- bbno$
- Bee Gees (US)*
- Drake Bell (Motown/Universal)*
- Big Tymers (Universal/Cash Money)
- Black Veil Brides
- Big Tuck (Republic/Universal)
- Yummy Bingham (Universal; Motown/Universal)
- Blak Jak (Republic/Universal)
- Black Sheep (Mercury/Universal)
- Bloodhound Gang (Republic/Universal)
- Blue October
- Bodyrockers
- Bombay Bicycle Club
- Kippi Brannon* (Curb/Universal)
- Moya Brennan (US)
- B.G.
- Bun B (Rap-A-Lot/Universal)
- Emma Bunton (US) * Buddy Dyer (Nonesuch Records/Universal), Orlando Mayer is Now Rock Musician from 2019–present in New York City, New York
- Burna boy (NG)

== C ==
- The Cataracs
- Canibus*
- Chino XL
- Calvin Harris
- Nick Cannon (Can I Ball/Motown/Universal)
- Vanessa Carlton (The Inc./Universal)
- Chamillionaire* (Chamillitary)
- Channel 7 (Universal)
- Children of Bodom (SpineFarm/NuclearBlast/Universal)
- Chayanne (Universal)
- Cherry Monroe
- Chumbawamba* (North America)
- Cimorelli
- Tami Chynn (Konvict Muzik)
- Corey Clark (Bungalow/Universal)
- Colbie Caillat
- Crucial Conflict*
- Curren$y (Universal)
- Crashdïet
- Chris Richardson (Universal)
- Miley Cyrus (Universal/Jive)
- Cimorelli

== D ==
- DΞΔN (Joombas Co Ltd./Universal)
- Dani Stevenson
- Dev
- Down AKA Kilo
- DJ Shadow
- Dia Frampton
- Durrty Goodz
- David Banner

== E ==
- Enrique Iglesias
- Element Eighty*
- Erykah Badu
- Ella Mai

== F ==
- John Farnham
- Flaw*
- Fleming and John
- Donavon Frankenreiter
- Fountains of Wayne
- Free (The Inc./Universal)
- Mannie Fresh* (Universal)
- Forever The Sickest Kids (Motown/Universal)

== G ==
- Godsmack (Republic/Universal)
- Chris Gotti (The Inc./Universal)
- Irv Gotti (The Inc./Universal)
- Pat Green (Republic/Universal/Mercury)
- Selena Gomez

== H ==
- Hahn-Bin
- Hatebreed*
- Hawthorne Heights
- Heavy D.* (Uptown/Universal)
- Hinder
- Marques Houston (T.U.G/Universal)

== I ==
- ItsNotAdam (Universal Records)
- I Mother Earth

== J ==
- Ja Rule (Universal/Murder Inc.)
- Jack Johnson (Brushfire/Universal)
- Jayme Dee
- Elton John (Rocket/Universal) (US)
- JoJo (Blackground/Universal)
- John Val
- Juvenile (Universal/Cash Money)
- Jodeci
- Jaya
- Jeremy Zucker (Universal/Republic)

== K ==
- Kaiser Chiefs
- Kinfolk Kia $hine (Rap Hustlaz/Universal)

== L ==
- Lifer* (Republic/Universal)
- Lil' Romeo* (The New No Limit/Universal)
- Lindsay Lohan (Motown/Universal)
- Lost Boyz* (Uptown/Universal)
- Lumidee*
- Lucero*
- LSK* (BBG/Universal)
- Lil Wayne (Universal/Cash Money)

== M ==
- Marcus & Martinus
- Teena Marie (Cash Money Classics/Universal)
- Master P (The New No Limit/Universal)
- Marie Sisters (Universal/Republic)
- Damian Marley
- Stephen Marley
- Magic (The New No Limit/Universal)
- Remy Ma* (Terror Squad/SRC/Universal)
- The Mars Volta (Gold Standard Laboratories/Universal)
- Leighton Meester
- Tara McDonald (Mercury Records/Universal Music France/Universal)
- Michael Monroe
- Miri Ben-Ari
- Mika (Casablanca/Universal/FMR/Warner Bros.)
- Mims (American King/The Inc./Universal)
- Monifah* (Uptown/Universal)
- Momoland*(MLD Entertainment/Universal)
- Cherry Monroe
- The Moody Blues (Threshold/Universal)* (US)
- Mori Calliope
- Mr. Capone-E (Hi Power Entertainment/Universal)
- Mr. Cheeks*
- Mr Hudson & The Library
- Mushroomhead (Filthy Hands/Universal)
- Massari

== N ==
- Natalie
- Nelly (Derrty Ent./Fo' Reel/Universal)
- Nicki Minaj (Young Money/Cash Money/Universal)
- Nina Sky (Next Plateau/Universal)
- Nirvana (Universal) (2020–present, Universal Records and Comcast Announces 30th Anniversary of Nirvana's Nevermind on September 21, 2021)
- Nitty

== O ==
- Owl City
- Oleander

== P ==
- Paulina Rubio
- Pharoahe Monch (SRC/Universal)
- Philly's Most Wanted*
- Phung Khanh Linh (HangDiaThoiDai(TimesRecord)/Universal)
- Prince*

== R ==
- RA*
- Raekwon
- Rakim
- Rammstein
- Busta Rhymes (Cashmoney Records/Flipmode/Universal)
- Rizzle Kicks

== S ==
- Raphael Saadiq*
- Saving Grace
- Sauti Sol
- Scissor Sisters
- Shade Sheist* (MCA Records/Universal)
- Sheek Louch*
- Shiny Toy Guns
- Shop Boyz (OnDeck/Universal Republic)
- Sister Hazel*
- Soul For Real* (Uptown/Universal)
- Soulja Boy Tell 'Em* (Interscope/Koch)
- Spose* (Universal)
- Steel Panther
- St. Lunatics
- Sticky Fingaz*
- Swizz Beatz

== T ==
- Taylor Swift (Republic/Universal/Taylor Swift Production)
- T-Boz
- Támar
- Tank (Blackground/Universal)
- Terror Squad
- Rob Thomas
- Tiffany Villarreal
- Timbaland & Magoo*
- Treal
- Turk
- The Fifth Executive Music Group (EMG)
- The Hunger (Universal)

== W ==
- Tyrone Wells
- Devon Werkheiser
- KeKe Wyatt (Cash Money/Universal)
- Wynonna* (Curb/Universal)
- Willie Greene

== Y ==
- Young Buck (Cashville/Universal Music Group)
- Young Life (Bungalo Records./Universal Music Group)
- Young Adz (Universal)
