= List of Late Night with Jimmy Fallon episodes (2013–14) =

- No. of episodes: 188 (2013); 26 (2014)

Release
- Original network: NBC

Season chronology
- ← Previous; 2012 episodes Next →

This is the list of episodes for Late Night with Jimmy Fallon in 2013 and 2014.

== 2013 ==
=== January ===
No.	Original release date	Guest(s)	Musical/entertainment guest(s)
757	January 2, 2013	Fred Armisen, Common, Shae Bradley & Shain Gandee	Lupe Fiasco
Animal Thoughts
758	January 3, 2013	Mayor Michael Bloomberg, NeNe Leakes	T.I.
Late Night Hashtags – #myweirdgymstory, Freestylin' With The Roots
759	January 4, 2013	Bill Cosby, Tempestt Bledsoe	Grace Potter and the Nocturnals
Thank You Notes
760	January 7, 2013	Betty White, Jeff Ross	Sky Ferreira
Night News Now, Pyramid – Fallon Vs. White
761	January 8, 2013	Jeff Bridges, Marlon Wayans, Ian Frazier	Conor Maynard
Pros & Cons – The Golden Globes, Act Out
762	January 9, 2013	William H. Macy, Ginnifer Goodwin, Rachael Ray	Randy Houser
Audience Suggestion Box, Pictionary – Fallon & Ray Vs. Macy & Goodwin
763	January 10, 2013	The Cast of 30 Rock	John Cale
Late Night Hashtags – #slapyourself
764	January 11, 2013	David Duchovny, Nicole "Snooki" Polizzi & Jenni "JWoww" Farley, Nick Kroll	Eli Young Band
Thank You Notes, Egg Russian Roulette – Fallon Vs. Duchovny
765	January 14, 2013	Uma Thurman, Tim Gunn	Bobby Collins
Pop Up Ads, Karate Pinata
766	January 15, 2013	Charlie Sheen, Emmy Rossum, Grace Coddington	Yo La Tengo
Pros & Cons – Getting The Flu Shot, True Facts Of Truth
767	January 16, 2013	Jeremy Renner, Hoda Kotb	Jessie Ware
Do Not Read List, Wheel Of Game Shows, Giant Quarters – Fallon Vs. Renner
768	January 17, 2013	Arnold Schwarzenegger, Maggie Q	Michael Kiwanuka
Late Night Hashtags – #iadmitit, Tomorrow's Star Today
769	January 18, 2013	Jessica Chastain, Josh Gad, Alan Zweibel	The Joy Formidable
Thank You Notes
770	January 28, 2013	Brian Williams, Max Greenfield	Eric Burdon
Slow Jam The News, Don't Quote Me
771	January 29, 2013	Lucy Liu, Billy Gardell	Ultraísta
Pros & Cons – Super Bowl XLVII, Shouts Outs, Rock Paper Scissors Pie – Fallon Vs. Liu
772	January 30, 2013	Jude Law, Mike Tyson, Joshua Topolsky	Bad Religion
Audience Suggestion Box
773	January 31, 2013	Channing Tatum, Megan Hilty, Tim Ferriss	Charlie Wilson
Late Night Hashtags – #worstsuperbowlparty, Night News Now, Sticky Balls – Fallon Vs. Tatum

=== February ===
No.	Original release date	Guest(s)	Musical/entertainment guest(s)
774	February 1, 2013	Jason Bateman, Zosia Mamet	Andrea Bocelli
Late Night Super Fan Supercut, Thank You Notes, Jacob's Patience
775	February 4, 2013	Russell Brand, Katharine McPhee	Jim James
Russell Brand Reads Star Magazine, Darts Of Insanity
776	February 5, 2013	Justin Bieber, Naomi Campbell	Local Natives
Downton Sixbey – Episode 3, 3-Point Shootout – Fallon Vs. Bieber
777	February 6, 2013	Whoopi Goldberg, Tavi Gevinson, Tommy Mottola	Kurt Metzger
Downton Sixbey – Episode 4
778	February 7, 2013	Joel McHale, Al Roker	Matt Pond
Pros & Cons – The Grammys, Sounds...Good?, Egg Russian Roulette – Fallon Vs. McHale
779	February 8, 2013	Jason Schwartzman, Keri Russell	Night Beds
Thank You Notes, Man's Head On Pig's Body
780	February 11, 2013	John Goodman, Carmelo Anthony	Gary Allan
2013 State Of The Union Address, iPhone Apps
781	February 12, 2013	Josh Duhamel, Craig Robinson, Christina Tosi	Ras Kass
Valentine's Day E-Cards, Cooler Scooter – Fallon Vs. Duhamel
782	February 13, 2013	Steve Harvey, Natalie Morales, Jeff Musial	Kacey Musgraves
Cupid's Arrow
783	February 14, 2013	Bruce Willis, Molly Shannon	Trinidad Jame$
Late Night Hashtags – #awkwarddate, Models & Buckets
784	February 15, 2013	Joan Rivers, Josh Charles	Gloriana
Thank You Notes, Night News Now, Bubble Soccer – Fallon & Justin Tucker Vs. Charles & Anquan Boldin
785	February 18, 2013	Artie Lange, Alison Brie	Tame Impala
On The Bright Side, Freestylin' With The Roots
786	February 19, 2013	David Spade, Cecily Strong	Atlas Genius
Pros & Cons – Going On A Carnival Cruise, Robot Voice
787	February 20, 2013	Don Cheadle, John Oliver	Ke$ha
If Puppies Could Vote – 2013 Oscars, Audience Suggestion Box
788	February 21, 2013	Stephen Colbert, Anthony Anderson, Sony PlayStation	Inspectah Deck and 7L & Esoteric
Late Night Hashtags – #badoscarsequels
789	February 22, 2013	Michelle Obama, Scarlett Johansson	The Avett Brothers
Thank You Notes, Evolution Of Mom Dancing
790	February 25, 2013	Alan Cumming, Michael Phelps, Kate Upton	Unknown Mortal Orchestra
He Said She Said, Cell Phone Shootout
791	February 26, 2013	Donald Trump, Rebecca Hall, Jon Glaser	Tyler, The Creator
Pros & Cons – Being On "The Bachelor", Do Not Play List
792	February 27, 2013	Christian Slater, Mia Wasikowska	Jason Aldean
Late Night Pop-Up Ads, Name That Guy, Catchphrase – Fallon Vs. Slater
793	February 28, 2013	Tina Fey, Bill Nighy	Bob Mould
Late Night Hashtags – #howigotfired, Cupid's Arrow, Pyramid – Fallon Vs. Fey

=== March ===
No.	Original release date	Guest(s)	Musical/entertainment guest(s)
794	March 1, 2013	Mariah Carey, Billy Eichner	Prince
Thank You Notes, Night News Now, Champagne Pong – Fallon Vs. Carey
795	March 11, 2013	Justin Timberlake, Timothy Olyphant, Dee Snider	Justin Timberlake
Mets Bucket Hat Guy
796	March 12, 2013	Charles Barkley, Allison Williams, Clive Davis	Justin Timberlake
Audience Suggestion Box
797	March 13, 2013	Steve Carell, Abigail Breslin	Justin Timberlake
Celebrity Whispers, Three Michael McDonalds, Jacob's Patience
798	March 14, 2013	Katie Couric, Freddie Highmore	Justin Timberlake
Late Night Hashtags – #misheardlyrics, Young Jimmy Fallon & Justin Timberlake Sing At Summer Camp, Pictionary – Fallon Vs. Couric
799	March 15, 2013	Justin Timberlake, Hayden Panettiere	Justin Timberlake
Thank You Notes, History Of Rap 4
800	March 18, 2013	Nicolas Cage, Mike Birbiglia, La Toya Jackson	Kip Moore
Do Not Read List
801	March 19, 2013	Selena Gomez, David Steinberg	Pinback
Pros & Cons – March Madness, Shout Outs
802	March 20, 2013	Rudy Giuliani, Judd Apatow, Marcus Samuelsson	Marcus Canty
Animal Thoughts, Freestylin' With The Roots
803	March 21, 2013	Drew Barrymore, Thandie Newton	Brandi Carlile
Late Night Hashtags – #worstbetever, Sports Freak-Out, Rouge-lette – Fallon Vs. Barrymore
804	March 22, 2013	Kevin Bacon, Elizabeth Mitchell, Gary Dell'Abate	Sigur Rós
Thank You Notes, Night News Now
805	March 25, 2013	Usher, Kate Mara, Claudia Jordan	Wale
On The Bright Side, Battle Of The Instant Songwriters
806	March 26, 2013	Ice-T, Chris Hardwick	Little Green Cars
Pros & Cons – Easter, Darts Of Insanity
807	March 27, 2013	Kathie Lee Gifford, James Purefoy	Dido
Audience Suggestion Box, Wine Pong – Fallon Vs. Gifford
808	March 28, 2013	Tyler Perry, Nick Offerman, Thom Filicia	Blake Shelton
Thank You Notes, The Chickeneers

=== April ===
No.	Original release date	Guest(s)	Musical/entertainment guest(s)
809	April 1, 2013	Alec Baldwin, Emilia Clarke, Omarosa	Janelle Monáe
Obama Expressions
810	April 2, 2013	Tracy Morgan, Andy Cohen	Deerhunter
Pros & Cons – Congress On Spring Break, True Facts Of Truth, Charades – Fallon & Cohen Vs. Higgins & Morgan
811	April 3, 2013	Sarah Silverman, Hugh Dancy	Gordon Lightfoot
Note: Jimmy Fallon officially announced he will become the 6th host of The Tonight Show. Don't Quote Me, Giant Quarters – Fallon Vs. Dancy
812	April 4, 2013	Melissa McCarthy, Chris Jericho	Ryan Bingham
Late Night Hashtags – #whydonttheymakethat, Jimmy's Corner, Pictionary – Fallon Vs. McCarthy
813	April 5, 2013	Anderson Cooper, Taran Killam, Stuart Edge	Cat Power
Puppy Predictors – 2013 Final Four Edition, Thank You Notes
814	April 8, 2013	Keith Richards, Edie Falco, Dennis Rodman	Ghostface Killah
Night News Now
815	April 9, 2013	Julianna Margulies, Adam Scott	Jonas Brothers
Jonas Brothers Meet Sara, Pros & Cons – Being Kim Jong-Un, Catchphrase – Fallon Vs. Margulies
816	April 10, 2013	Bill Cosby, Ashley Tisdale, Sandra Lee	Tyga
Dance Your Hat & Gloves Off
817	April 11, 2013	Vince Vaughn, Amy Schumer, Joshua Topolsky	Major Lazer
Late Night Instagrams – My Pet Is Weird
818	April 12, 2013	Tom Cruise, Jordana Brewster	Shuggie Otis
Thank You Notes, Wheel Of Game Shows, Egg Russian Roulette – Fallon Vs. Cruise
819	April 22, 2013	January Jones, Savannah Guthrie, Brande Roderick, Ilan Hall	Fantasia
Freestylin' With The Roots
820	April 23, 2013	Eli Manning, Adam Ferrara	Phosphorescent
Pros & Cons – NBC Earth Week, Sounds...Good?, Football Skeet Shooting
821	April 24, 2013	Ricky Gervais, Jessica Paré	Talib Kweli
Audience Suggestion Box
822	April 25, 2013	Susan Sarandon, Anthony Mackie	The National
Late Night Hashtags – #mydoctorisweird, Tell Us What You Know
823	April 26, 2013	Amy Poehler, Michael Angarano	Iron & Wine
Thank You Notes, cluck., Password – Fallon Vs. Poehler
824	April 29, 2013	Rebel Wilson, Anthony Bourdain, Gary Busey	Retta
Gary Busey Karaoke
825	April 30, 2013	Winona Ryder, Marc Maron	Kenny Chesney
Pros & Cons – Anthony Weiner Running For Mayor, Wax On Wax Off

=== May ===
No.	Original release date	Guest(s)	Musical/entertainment guest(s)
826	May 1, 2013	Ben Kingsley, Kal Penn	Johnny Marr
Rumor Has It, Jimmy's Corner
827	May 2, 2013	Zach Galifianakis, Isla Fisher, George Lois	Icona Pop
Late Night Hashtags – #ifihadasuperpower, True Facts Of Truth
828	May 3, 2013	Carey Mulligan, Alexander Skarsgård, John Densmore	Eve
Jimmy Interviews Kentucky Derby Horse Orb, Thank You Notes, Puppy Predictors – Kentucky Derby Edition
829	May 6, 2013	Steve Martin, Jenna Fischer, Marilu Henner	Steve Martin & Edie Brickell
Do Not Play List
830	May 7, 2013	John Krasinski, Eli Roth, Floyd Mayweather	The Breeders
Pros & Cons – Visiting A Theme Park In North Korea, Lip Sync-Off – Fallon Vs. Krasinski
831	May 8, 2013	Rachel Maddow, Zachary Quinto	Lady Antebellum
Audience Suggestion Box
832	May 9, 2013	Jane Lynch, Nikolaj Coster-Waldau	Lady Antebellum
Late Night Hashtags – #momquotes, Shout Outs, Charades – Fallon Vs. Lynch
833	May 10, 2013	LL Cool J, Alyson Hannigan, Benedict Cumberbatch	LL Cool J
Thank You Notes, Night News Now
834	May 13, 2013	Bradley Cooper, Portia de Rossi, Lisa Rinna & Lil Jon	Vampire Weekend
Late Night Superlatives, Faceketball – Fallon Vs. Cooper
835	May 14, 2013	Matt Lauer, Ken Jeong	Phoenix
Pros & Cons – Being A Trekkie, Wheel Of Carpet Samples
836	May 15, 2013	Julie Bowen, Demi Lovato	The Flaming Lips
Celebrity Riders, Do The Blank, Pictionary – Fallon & Lovato Vs. Bowen & Wayne Coyne
837	May 16, 2013	Mindy Kaling, Tim McGraw	Tim McGraw
Late Night Hashtags – #awkwardpromstory, iPhone Apps, Horseshoes – Fallon Vs. McGraw
838	May 17, 2013	Zoe Saldaña, Chris O'Dowd	De La Soul
Thank You Notes, Models & Buckets, Spaceballs – Fallon Vs. Saldaña
839	May 20, 2013	Colin Farrell, Jaden Smith, Trace Adkins & Penn Jillette	Ahmir
He Said She Said, Fast Forward & The Furious – Day 1
840	May 21, 2013	Aziz Ansari, Gillian Anderson	J. Cole
Pros & Cons – Watching The Indy 500, Fast Forward & The Furious – Day 2, Freestylin' With The Roots
841	May 22, 2013	Dana Carvey, Elisabeth Moss	Bobby McFerrin
Late Night Superlatives, Fast Forward & The Furious – Day 3, Darts Of Insanity
842	May 23, 2013	Julianne Moore, Jesse Tyler Ferguson, Danny Bowien	The-Dream
C-SPAN Schedule, Late Night Hashtags – #worstcarieverhad, Fast Forward & The Furious – Day 4, Flip Cup – Fallon Vs. Moore
843	May 24, 2013	Paul Walker, Joss Whedon	They Might Be Giants
Anthony Weiner's Mayor Campaign, Thank You Notes, Fast Forward & The Furious – Day 5, Game Of Desks – Episode 1

=== June ===
No.	Original release date	Guest(s)	Musical/entertainment guest(s)
844	June 3, 2013	Nathan Lane, Zoë Kravitz	Tomahawk
Do Not Read List, Competitive Spit-Takes
845	June 4, 2013	Ethan Hawke, Rose Byrne, Caitlyn Jenner	Savages
Pros & Cons – Superman Turning 75
846	June 5, 2013	Glenn Close, Dolph Lundgren	Portugal. The Man
Audience Suggestion Box, Rock Paper Scissors Pie – Fallon Vs. Close
847	June 6, 2013	Christopher Meloni, Cat Deeley	Broken Social Scene featuring Feist
Brian Williams Raps Warren G's "Regulate", Late Night Hashtags – #howigotdumped, Audience Got Talent, Sticky Balls – Fallon Vs. Meloni
848	June 7, 2013	Neil Patrick Harris, Jim Gaffigan	The-Dream featuring Gary Clark, Jr.
Brian Williams Raps N.W.A's "Straight Outta Compton", Obama Analyzes Verizon Customers' Text Messages, Thank You Notes, Catchphrase – Fallon Vs. Harris
849	June 10, 2013	Russell Crowe, Sofia Coppola, Jamie King	Kelly Rowland featuring Wiz Khalifa
Justin Bieber Retweets: Workout, Night News Now
850	June 11, 2013	Seth Rogen, Jeffrey Tambor	The Lumineers
Pros & Cons – Dating Vladimir Putin, Justin Bieber Retweets: Happy, Jacob's Patience
851	June 12, 2013	Chris Christie, Jennette McCurdy; Mario, Benno, & Leo Batali	Young Fathers
Slow Jam The News With Chris Christie, Justin Bieber Retweets: Live Life Full, Tebowie
852	June 13, 2013	Julia Louis-Dreyfus, Val Kilmer	Nate Bargatze
Late Night Hashtags – #dadquotes, Justin Bieber Retweets: We Work Hard, Intimate Interview
853	June 14, 2013	Adam Levine, Cedric the Entertainer	Ariana Grande featuring Mac Miller
Thank You Notes, Justin Bieber Retweets: Frog Lawn Mower, Jerry & Jerry
854	June 17, 2013	Howard Stern, Alyssa Milano, Xbox One	Anamanaguchi
Do Not Game List, "Xbox One" Demo
855	June 18, 2013	Jerry Seinfeld, Sony PS4	Ice Cube
"Yodel" With Jimmy Fallon & Brad Pitt, Late Night Superlatives, We Are The World Of Warcraft, "Sony PS4" Demo
856	June 19, 2013	Kevin Hart, Olivia Munn, Watch Dogs	Chvrches
Audience Suggestion Box, "Watch Dogs" Demo
857	June 20, 2013	Elijah Wood, Grant Bowler, Call of Duty: Ghosts	Yeah Yeah Yeahs
Late Night Hashtags – #beachfail, Gaming With My Mom, "Call Of Duty: Ghosts" Demo
858	June 21, 2013	Jason Statham, Adrian Peterson, The Guys from RecordSetter, Nintendo Wii U	Zedd featuring Foxes
Thank You Notes, Jimmy & Jason Statham Arm Wrestle, "Nintendo Wii U" Demo

=== July ===
No.	Original release date	Guest(s)	Musical/entertainment guest(s)
859	July 8, 2013	Jeff Musial, Jeff Daniels, Nick Swardson	Preservation Hall Jazz Band
Don't Quote Me
860	July 9, 2013	David Spade, Kris Jenner	Mudhoney
Pros & Cons – Hiring Paula Deen, Battle Of The Instant Songwriters
861	July 10, 2013	Adam Sandler, Mireille Enos	Eleanor Friedberger
In Reply To, Cell Phone Shootout
862	July 11, 2013	Salma Hayek Pinault, Charlie Day, April Bloomfield	Jay-Z
Late Night Hashtags – #fakejayzlyrics, Name That Guy, Flip Cup – Fallon Vs. Pinault
863	July 12, 2013	Kristin Scott Thomas, Sam Rockwell	Ciara with Future
David Brent Guitar Lessons, Thank You Notes, Night News Now, Improv Dance – Fallon Vs. Rockwell
864	July 15, 2013	Kristen Wiig, Nick Cannon	Adam Ant
Matt Harvey Asks New Yorkers About Matt Harvey, Late Night Perm Week – Day 1
865	July 16, 2013	Bruce Willis, Mama June	Mayer Hawthorne
Pros & Cons – Being A Major League All-Star, Mets Bucket Hat Guy, Late Night Perm Week – Day 2
866	July 17, 2013	Catherine Zeta-Jones, Colin Quinn	Gogol Bordello
Late Night Perm Week – Day 3, Audience Suggestion Box
867	July 18, 2013	Ryan Reynolds, Bob Saget	Fall Out Boy
Late Night Hashtags – #itssohot, Late Night Perm Week – Day 4, Water War – Fallon Vs. Reynolds
868	July 19, 2013	Jeff Bridges, Stacy Keibler	Jesse and the Rippers
Thank You Notes, Late Night Perm Week – Day 5
869	July 22, 2013	Howie Mandel, Eliot Spitzer	Kings of Leon
Celebrity Riders, Do Not Watch List
870	July 24, 2013	Hugh Jackman, Natasha Lyonne, Frank Pellegrino, Jr.	U-God
Pros & Cons – Being The Royal Baby, Audience Got Talent, I Drink You Drink – Fallon Vs. Jackman
871	July 25, 2013	Andy Samberg, Shailene Woodley, Marcine & Nita Lou Webb	New Order
Late Night Hashtags – #parentfail
872	July 26, 2013	Liev Schreiber, Anthony Anderson	Imagine Dragons
Carlos Danger Enters NYC Mayoral Race, Thank You Notes, Freestylin' With The Roots
873	July 29, 2013	Mark Wahlberg, Poppy Montgomery	The Virgins
Brian Williams Raps Marky Mark & The Funky Bunch, Screen Grabs, Robot Voice
874	July 30, 2013	Dan Aykroyd, Paula Patton	Brad Paisley
Pros & Cons – Campaigning For Anthony Weiner, Jimmy Fallon & Brad Paisley Sing "Balls In Your Mouth"
875	July 31, 2013	Tyra Banks, Simon Pegg, Dominique Ansel	Jay Sean
Audience Suggestion Box

=== August ===
No.	Original release date	Guest(s)	Musical/entertainment guest(s)
876	August 1, 2013	Jennifer Aniston, Lenny Kravitz	Goodie Mob
Late Night Hashtags – #sharkrap, Pictionary – Fallon & Cee Lo Green Vs. Aniston & Kravitz
877	August 2, 2013	Bryan Cranston, Common, Miranda Hart	Robin Thicke
Thank You Notes, Let Us Play With Your Look
878	August 5, 2013	Seth Meyers, Lily Collins	2 Chainz
In Reply To, Egg Russian Roulette – Fallon Vs. Meyers
879	August 6, 2013	Jane Fonda, Steve & Monica Ward	The Head and the Heart
President Obama Calls Jimmy Fallon After "Tonight Show" Appearance, Late Night Superlatives, Brian Williams Raps Young MC, Pros & Cons – Shark Week, Ladysmith Snack Mambazo: Pringles
880	August 7, 2013	Amanda Seyfried, Fran Lebowitz	Brett Eldredge
Late Night E-Cards, Wheel Of Game Shows, Catchphrase – Fallon Vs. Seyfried
881	August 8, 2013	Derek Jeter, Emma Roberts	Jake Owen
Late Night Hashtags – #ifiwonthepowerball
882	August 9, 2013	Vanessa Hudgens, John Oliver	Earl Sweatshirt
Thank You Notes, Battle Of The Instant Rappers. Note: This marked the final time Late Night would air in Studio 6B, as renovations begin to construct for The Tonight Show.

=== September ===
No.	Original release date	Guest(s)	Musical/entertainment guest(s)
883	September 3, 2013	Michael Strahan, Demi Lovato	Neko Case
Note: 1st Late Night With Jimmy Fallon in Studio 6A, Pros & Cons – The 2013 NFL Season, Do Not Read List, Catchphrase – Fallon & Strahan Vs. Higgins & Lovato
884	September 4, 2013	Heidi Klum, Cory Booker	The Julie Ruin
In Reply To, Audience Suggestion Box
885	September 5, 2013	Steve Buscemi, Bethenny Frankel, Daniel Humm	Illusionist Leon Etienne and Romy Low
Late Night Superlatives, Late Night Hashtags – #makebuscemisay, I Drink You Drink – Fallon Vs. Frankel
886	September 6, 2013	Katie Couric, Patton Oswalt, Eugenio Derbez	New Politics
Thank You Notes, Jimmy Fallon & Ariana Grande Sing Broadway Versions Of Rap Songs
887	September 9, 2013	Steve Harvey, The Duck Dynasty Cast	Kanye West
Screen Grabs
888	September 10, 2013	Michelle Pfeiffer, David Cross	Volcano Choir
Pros & Cons – Buying The New iPhone, Evolution Of End Zone Dancing w/ Justin Timberlake, Pictionary – Fallon Vs. Pfeiffer
889	September 11, 2013	Ricky Gervais, Michael Shannon	MGMT
Joking Bad – Episode 1
890	September 12, 2013	KriStef Brothers, Robert De Niro, Amy Sedaris	Alt-J
Anthony Weiner Song With Sheryl Crow, Late Night Hashtags – #myroommateisweird
891	September 13, 2013	Scarlett Johansson, Drake	Drake featuring Sampha
Late Night Superlatives, Thank You Notes, Charades – Fallon & Drake Vs. Tariq Trotter & Johansson
892	September 16, 2013	Ben Affleck, Mindy Kaling	Pixies
Celebrity Whispers
893	September 17, 2013	The Kids from The Short Game, Orlando Bloom, Elvis Costello	Elvis Costello & The Roots
Pros & Cons – The Pumpkin Spice Latte, Young Jimmy Fallon & Justin Timberlake Sing At Camp Winnipesaukee
894	September 18, 2013	Chris Hemsworth, Tony Danza	Jack Johnson
Audience Suggestion Box, Go-Kart Race – Fallon Vs. Hemsworth
895	September 19, 2013	Kenichi Ebina, Hugh Jackman, Gillian Flynn	Elvis Costello & The Roots
Wheel Of Fortune Contestant Gets Redemption, Arm Wrestle – Fallon Vs. Jackman
896	September 20, 2013	James Spader, Kate Upton, Neal Preston, Chef Ilan Hall	Jason Derulo
Late Night Superlatives, Thank You Notes, Flip Cup – Fallon Vs. Upton
897	September 24, 2013	Joseph Gordon-Levitt, Stephen Merchant	The Avett Brothers
Hashtag With Justin Timberlake, Lip Sync Battle – Fallon Vs. Levitt Vs. Merchant
898	September 25, 2013	Michael J. Fox, Blake Shelton	Kings of Leon
Pros & Cons – Watching Breaking Bad, Jimmy Fallon, Sesame Street & The Roots Sing "Sesame Street" Theme (with Classroom Instruments)
899	September 26, 2013	Tina Fey, Lindsay Lohan	Goldfrapp
Ew!, Box Of Lies – Fallon Vs. Fey
900	September 27, 2013	Julianna Margulies, Michael Sheen	Superchunk
Late Night Superlatives, Thank You Notes, Pictionary – Fallon Vs. Margulies
901	September 30, 2013	Kevin Nealon, Elizabeth Olsen	The Avett Brothers & Chris Cornell
Bottom Of The Charts, In Reply To, The Avett Brothers Sing Heavy Metal

=== October ===
No.	Original release date	Guest(s)	Musical/entertainment guest(s)
902	October 1, 2013	Rebel Wilson, Joel Osteen	Lorde
Pros & Cons – Dancing With Bill Nye The Science Guy, Do Not Play List
903	October 2, 2013	Paul Giamatti, Anthony Mackie	MS MR
Audience Suggestion Box
904	October 3, 2013	Meredith Vieira, Mario Batali	Jaheim
Late Night Hashtags – #momtexts, Duck Dynasty Karaoke
905	October 4, 2013	Artie Lange, Tavi Gevinson	Phantogram
Late Night Superlatives, Thank You Notes
906	October 7, 2013	Paul McCartney, Dylan McDermott	Paul McCartney
Jimmy Fallon & Paul McCartney Switch Accents
907	October 8, 2013	Miley Cyrus	Miley Cyrus
Pros & Cons – Going To Outer Space, Jacob's Patience
908	October 9, 2013	Jeff Musial, Alan Rickman, Chloë Grace Moretz	Ylvis
909	October 10, 2013	Katy Perry, Jessica Seinfeld	Brian Wilson & Jeff Beck
Late Night Hashtags – #whyimsingle, Taboo – Fallon Vs. Perry
910	October 11, 2013	Keanu Reeves, Benedict Cumberbatch	My Morning Jacket featuring Brittany Howard & Merrill Garbus
Late Night Superlatives, Thank You Notes, Freestyling With My Mom
911	October 21, 2013	Alec Baldwin, Kevin Connolly	Chris Cornell with The Avett Brothers
Screen Grabs, Jimmy Fallon & Alec Baldwin's 80's Cop Show
912	October 22, 2013	Johnny Knoxville, Hailee Steinfeld	Robin Pecknold
Bottom Of The Charts, Pros & Cons – Starring In 50 Shades Of Grey, Battle Shots – Fallon Vs. Knoxville
913	October 23, 2013	Julie Bowen, Mandy Patinkin	Dierks Bentley with Mike McCready & The Roots
Audience Suggestion Box, Box Of Lies – Fallon Vs. Bowen
914	October 24, 2013	Edward Norton, Judd Apatow	Pearl Jam
Late Night Hashtags – #halloweenrap, Egg Russian Roulette Fallon Vs. Norton
915	October 25, 2013	Javier Bardem, Eddie Vedder	Pearl Jam
Late Night Superlatives, Thank You Notes, Battle Of The Instant Songwriters
916	October 28, 2013	Hugh Laurie, Celine Dion	Celine Dion
He Said She Said, Singing Password – Fallon & Dion Vs. Laurie & Captain Kirk Douglas
917	October 29, 2013	Kate Bosworth, Tim Conway	Chromeo featuring Death from Above 1979
Pros & Cons – Being Dracula, Karate Pinata
918	October 30, 2013	Aziz Ansari, Minka Kelly	The Weeknd
Wheel Of Carpet Samples
919	October 31, 2013	Kerry Washington, Jason Schwartzman, Flynn McGarry	Amel Larrieux
Scary Lamp, Mr. Scarecrow

=== November ===
No.	Original release date	Guest(s)	Musical/entertainment guest(s)
920	November 1, 2013	Harrison Ford, Padma Lakshmi	Big Sean featuring Kid Cudi
Late Night Superlatives, Thank You Notes, Harrison Ford Pierces Jimmy Fallon's Ear
921	November 4, 2013	Simon Baker, John McCain	The Dismemberment Plan
Katy Perry Retweets: Day 1, iPhone Apps, Stump – Fallon Vs. Baker
922	November 5, 2013	Lucy Liu, Zachary Quinto, Giada De Laurentiis	TGT
Pros & Cons – Being A Zombie, Katy Perry Retweets: Day 2, Catchphrase – Fallon & De Laurentiis Vs. Liu & Quinto
923	November 6, 2013	Jason Statham, Tom Green	Emeli Sandé
Katy Perry Retweets: Day 3, Do Not Read List, Water War – Fallon Vs. Statham
924	November 7, 2013	Rachel Maddow, M.I.A.	M.I.A.
Late Night Hashtags – #mysuperpower, Katy Perry Retweets: Day 4
925	November 8, 2013	Natalie Portman, Taye Diggs	Nate Bargatze
Late Night Superlatives, Thank You Notes, Katy Perry Retweets: Day 5
926	November 11, 2013	Billy Crystal, Evan Rachel Wood	Cher Lloyd featuring Skee-Lo
Celebrity Whispers, Lip Flip
927	November 12, 2013	Mariah Carey, Malcolm Gladwell	Capital Cities
Pros & Cons – Getting A Prostate Exam, Mariah Carey Surprises Super Fans With "The Art of Letting Go"
928	November 13, 2013	Ice-T, Sony PS4	Thomas Rhett
Wax On Wax Off
929	November 14, 2013	Damian Lewis, Steve Coogan	Sheryl Crow
Late Night Hashtags – #myweirdrelative, Charades – Fallon & Coogan Vs. Lewis & Crow
930	November 15, 2013	Tom Selleck, Jena Malone	Johnny Marr
Late Night Superlatives, Thank You Notes
931	November 18, 2013	Bill Cosby	Bonnie Raitt
In Reply To, Freestylin' With The Roots
932	November 19, 2013	Forest Whitaker, Andy Cohen	Cut Copy
Pros & Cons – Being A Mayor On Crack, Night News Now
933	November 20, 2013	Will Forte, Xbox One	Charlie Wilson
Audience Suggestion Box
934	November 21, 2013	Liam Hemsworth, Bobby Moynihan	Sleigh Bells
Late Night Hashtags – #thanksgivingfail, Cooler Scooter Race – Fallon Vs. Hemsworth
935	November 22, 2013	Sarah Silverman, Lenny Kravitz, Michael Anthony	Yo Gotti
Late Night Superlatives, Thank You Notes, Desk Fort
936	November 25, 2013	Kelly Ripa, Stephen Moyer	Mazzy Star
Tracy Morgan Says 28 Thanksgiving-y Things, Pictionary – Fallon Vs. Ripa
937	November 26, 2013	Josh Hutcherson, Budd Friedman	Kelly Clarkson
Pros & Cons – Thanksgiving, Thanksgiving Object Shootout – Fallon Vs. Hutcherson
938	November 27, 2013	Jeff Musial, Edward Burns, Steven Van Zandt	Florida Georgia Line
Mandy Patinkin Teaches Jimmy Fallon Candy Crush
939	November 28, 2013	Rashida Jones, Carrie Underwood	Ariana Grande
Late Night Superlatives, Thank You Notes, Jimmy, Rashida & Carrie Sing A Thanksgiving Song

=== December ===
No.	Original release date	Guest(s)	Musical/entertainment guest(s)
940	December 9, 2013	Amy Adams, Oscar Isaac	Jack Johnson
The 5 Days Of Christmas Sweaters Day 1, Classroom Instruments – "All I Want For Christmas Is You", Late Night Stocking Stuffers, Catchphrase – Fallon Vs. Adams
941	December 10, 2013	John Goodman, Michelle Dockery	Yo Gabba Gabba!
The 5 Days Of Christmas Sweaters Day 2, Pros & Cons – Christmas In New York, Late Night Stocking Stuffers, Antler Ring Toss – Fallon Vs. Dockery
942	December 11, 2013	Joaquin Phoenix, Candice Bergen	Iron and Wine & Calexico
The 5 Days Of Christmas Sweaters Day 3, Late Night Hashtags – #worstgiftever, Late Night Stocking Stuffers
943	December 12, 2013	Emma Thompson, James Marsden	Kelly Clarkson
The 5 Days Of Christmas Sweaters Day 4, Robert De Niro Vs. Revolving Door, Late Night Stocking Stuffers
944	December 13, 2013	Ralph Fiennes, Juliette Lewis	Austin Mahone
Late Night Superlatives, The 5 Days Of Christmas Sweaters Day 5, Late Night Stocking Stuffers, Thank You Notes

== 2014 ==
=== January ===
No.	Original release date	Guest(s)	Musical/entertainment guest(s)
Special	January 5, 2014	Best of Late Night with Jimmy Fallon Primetime Special	N/A
Various segments were aired from the show's entire tenure during this two-hour special
945	January 6, 2014	Matthew McConaughey, Gisele Bündchen	Stephen Malkmus and the Jicks
Do Not Read List, Flip Cup – Fallon & Bündchen Vs. Higgins & McConaughey
946	January 7, 2014	Ryan Seacrest, Gabrielle Union	John Newman
Pros & Cons – Making A New Year's Resolution, Animal Thoughts, Rock Paper Scissors Pie – Fallon Vs. Seacrest
947	January 8, 2014	William H. Macy, Bethenny Frankel, Michael Chiarello	Beyonce
Mets Bucket Hat Guy, Catchphrase – Fallon & Frankel Vs. Higgins & Macy
948	January 9, 2014	Wanda Sykes, F. Murray Abraham	Parquet Courts
Bottom Of The Charts, Late Night Hashtags – #myweirdwaiter
949	January 10, 2014	James Spader, Andrew Rannells	Sharon Jones & The Dap-Kings
Late Night Superlatives, Thank You Notes
950	January 13, 2014	Queen Latifah, Jon Bernthal	London Grammar
Freestylin' With The Roots, Antler Ring Toss – Fallon Vs. Latifah
951	January 14, 2014	Bruce Springsteen	Bruce Springsteen & The E Street Band
Pros & Cons – Being On The Bachelor, Bruce Springsteen & Jimmy Fallon: "Gov. Christie Traffic Jam" ("Born To Run" Parody)
952	January 15, 2014	Ice Cube, Mark Consuelos, Danny Bowien	Kid Ink
Audience Suggestion Box
953	January 16, 2014	Drake, Ana Gasteyer	Neon Trees
Late Night Hashtags – #awkwarddate, Beer Hockey – Fallon Vs. Drake
954	January 17, 2014	Kevin Hart, Tim Gunn	Jhené Aiko
Late Night Superlatives, Thank You Notes, Tiny Guest Interview With Kevin Hart
955	January 20, 2014	Jessica Alba, Elvis Duran	Disclosure featuring Sam Smith
In Reply To, Double Turtleneck Ping Pong – Fallon & Alba Vs. Higgins & James Poyser
956	January 21, 2014	Bill Gates, Kate McKinnon	Wild Cub
Pros & Cons – The Return Of The Polar Vortex
957	January 22, 2014	Kevin Nealon, Lupita Nyong'o	Diane Birch
Darts Of Insanity
958	January 23, 2014	Jonah Hill, Dick Cavett, Wylie Dufresne	Jamie Grace
Late Night Hashtags – #polarvortexsongs
959	January 24, 2014	Mitt Romney, James Purefoy	Schoolboy Q
Late Night Superlatives, Slow Jam The News With Mitt Romney, Thank You Notes
960	January 27, 2014	Johnny Knoxville, Barry Gibb	Barry Gibb
Celebrity Whispers, Late Knights Race – Fallon Vs. Knoxville
961	January 28, 2014	Seth Meyers, Joe Buck	Liv Warfield
Pros & Cons – The Super Bowl Coming To New York, Jimmy Passes the Late Night Pickle to Seth Meyers
962	January 29, 2014	Jennifer Connelly, Miles Teller, Ronan Farrow	Sheng Wang
Full House Cold Open, Bottom Of The Charts
963	January 30, 2014	Melissa McCarthy	David Crosby
Late Night Hashtags – #mydumbinjury, Audience Suggestion Box, Box Of Lies – Fallon Vs. McCarthy
964	January 31, 2014	David Beckham, David Steinberg	Busta Rhymes
Late Night Superlatives, Thank You Notes, Egg Russian Roulette – Fallon Vs. Beckham

=== February ===
No.	Original release date	Guest(s)	Musical/entertainment guest(s)
965	February 3, 2014	Best of Late Night with Jimmy Fallon: Musical Sketches	N/A
Various musical segments were aired from the show's entire tenure
966	February 4, 2014	Best of Late Night with Jimmy Fallon: Digital Originals	N/A
Various digital originals were aired from the show's entire tenure
967	February 5, 2014	Best of Late Night with Jimmy Fallon: Great Comedy Pieces	N/A
Various comedy pieces were aired from the show's entire tenure
968	February 6, 2014	Colin Farrell, Chris Pratt	2 Chainz
Late Night Hashtags – #worstadvice, Bubble Soccer – Fallon & Frank Knuckles Vs. Farrell & Pratt
969	February 7, 2014	Andy Samberg	The Muppets
Thank You Notes, Intense Interview with Samberg. Note: FINAL SHOW.
