= List of Late Night with Jimmy Fallon episodes (2012) =

- No. of episodes: 195

Release
- Original network: NBC

Season chronology
- ← Previous; 2011 episodes Next → 2013–14 episodes

This is the list of episodes for Late Night with Jimmy Fallon in 2012.

== 2012 ==
=== January ===
No.	Original release date	Guest(s)	Musical/entertainment guest(s)
563	January 3, 2012	William H. Macy, Chris Gethard	Black Star
Pros & Cons - New Year's Resolutions, Robot Voice, Late Night Charades - Fallon Vs. Macy
564	January 4, 2012	Edward Burns, Alexa Chung, Geoffrey Zakarian	Yo Gotti
Mitt Romney's Press Conference, Sing It Like You Mean It, Football Bowling - Fallon Vs. Burns
565	January 5, 2012	Rachel Maddow, Fred Armisen	Sharon Van Etten
Late Night Hashtags - #momquotes, Mets Bucket Hat Guy
566	January 6, 2012	David Duchovny, Judah Friedlander	Wild Flag
Thank You Notes, Russell Brand Reads US Weekly, Random Object Football - Fallon Vs. Duchovny
567	January 9, 2012	Mark Wahlberg, Napoleon Dynamite	Surfer Blood
Late Night E-Cards, Karate Pinata, Box Hockey - Fallon Vs. Wahlberg
568	January 10, 2012	Tina Fey, Jean Dujardin, Handsome Dick Manitoba	The War on Drugs
Pros & Cons - Jay-Z & Beyonce Become Parents, Speed Celebrity - Fallon Vs. Fey
569	January 11, 2012	Rosie O'Donnell, Donnie Wahlberg	Robin Thicke
Celebrity Whispers, Shout Outs, Catchphrase - Fallon Vs. O'Donnell
570	January 12, 2012	Daniel Radcliffe, Elisabeth Hasselbeck	Common
Tebowie, Late Night Hashtags - #textingdisaster, Cricket Home Run Durby - Fallon Vs. Radcliffe
571	January 13, 2012	Queen Latifah, Miranda Cosgrove	John Mulaney
Black Cat In Audience, Thank You Notes, Charades - Fallon & Higgins Vs. Latifah & Dolly Parton
572	January 16, 2012	Liam Neeson, Piers Morgan	Chiddy Bang
Bargain Bin, Competitive Spit-Takes, Brainstorm
573	January 17, 2012	Kyra Sedgwick, Ndamukong Suh, Abby Lee Miller	Outasight
Pros & Cons - American Idol Season 11, Total Iceholes - Fallon Vs. Sedgwick
574	January 18, 2012	Bill Cosby, Anthony Mackie	Wale
Animal Thoughts
575	January 19, 2012	Ewan McGregor, Ask This Old House	The Avett Brothers
Late Night Hashtags - #gamedaysuperstition, Goat Leg Greg
576	January 20, 2012	Joan Rivers, Stacy Keibler	Cults
Thank You Notes, Audience Voice Mail, Password - Fallon & Keibler Vs. Joan & Melissa Rivers
577	January 30, 2012	Glenn Close, Emmy Rossum	Nada Surf
Do Not Read List, Battle Of The Instant Bands
578	January 31, 2012	Jeff Musial, Jack McBrayer, Gayle King	J. Cole
Puppy Predictors Super Bowl Recap, Jackie Football & The Stadium

=== February ===
No.	Original release date	Guest(s)	Musical/entertainment guest(s)
579	February 1, 2012	Tracy Morgan, Tim Tebow	The All-American Rejects
Head Swap, Subway Subs Across America, Freestyling With The Roots
580	February 2, 2012	Taylor Lautner, Adam Levine	Nas
Real Housewives Of Late Night - Episode 10, Audience Suggestion Box, Football Target Toss - Drew Brees Vs. Lautner
581	February 3, 2012	Snoop Dogg, Shaquille O'Neal	Fitz and the Tantrums
Thank You Notes, Shaq's Walk Of Shame, Models & Buckets
582	February 5, 2012	Adam Sandler, Andy Samberg	Flo Rida
Live From Indianapolis, The Voice Super Bowl Halftime Show Auditions, Keg Stand With Adam Sandler & Andy Samberg
N–A	February 6, 2012	Best Of: Music on Late Night with Jimmy Fallon	N/A
583	February 7, 2012	Harry Connick, Jr., Kellan Lutz, Jon Glaser	The Cranberries
Let's Move With Michelle Obama
584	February 8, 2012	Vanessa Hudgens, Victor Cruz	of Montreal
Late Night Hashtags - #myworstvalentine, Cell Phone Shootout, Shoe Golf - Fallon Vs. Hudgens
585	February 9, 2012	Zooey Deschanel, Chris Hardwick	Primus
He Said She Said, Ready Set Flow, Catchphrase - Fallon Vs. Deschanel
586	February 10, 2012	Dwayne Johnson, Gabrielle Union	Neal Brennan
Thank You Notes, Wheel Of Carpet Samples, Journey 2 Extra Scenes
587	February 13, 2012	Nicolas Cage, Curt Schilling, John Besh	Tyga
Celebrity Whispers, Cupid's Arrow Dating Show
588	February 14, 2012	Donald Trump, Idris Elba	Jake Owen
Stephen Colbert's Valentine's Day Gift, Audience Voice Mails, Password - Fallon & Teresa Giudice Vs. Trump & Dee Snider
589	February 15, 2012	Greg Kinnear, Poppy Montgomery	The Drums
Pros & Cons - Mardi Gras, Wax On Wax Off, Total Iceholes - Fallon Vs. Kinnear
590	February 16, 2012	Maya Rudolph, Dylan Ratigan	Young Jeezy featuring Ne-Yo
Late Night Hashtags - #mygrandmaiscool, Pyramid - Fallon Vs. Rudolph
591	February 17, 2012	Ricky Gervais, Katharine McPhee	School of Seven Bells
Thank You Notes, Night News Now
592	February 20, 2012	Anjelica Huston, Hugh Dancy, Todd Glass	How to Succeed in Business Without Really Trying
Jimmy Fallon Back On Broadway, Late Night E-Cards
593	February 21, 2012	Tyler Perry, David Wain	Porgy and Bess
Pros & Cons - NBA All-Star Weekend, Robot Voice, Fish Race - Fallon Vs. Perry
594	February 22, 2012	Alan Alda, Jane Krakowski	Ghost the Musical
Obama Expressions, Sports Freak Out
595	February 23, 2012	William Shatner, Padma Lakshmi, Andrew Rannells, Josh Gad	Anything Goes
Late Night Hashtags - #mysiblingisweird, Pearl Jam Sings "Jeremy (Lin)"
596	February 24, 2012	Paul Rudd, Thandie Newton	Sister Act
Thank You Notes, If Puppies Could Vote
597	February 27, 2012	Julianna Margulies, Seann William Scott	Bruce Springsteen and the E Street Band
Slow Jam The News, Cupid's Arrow
598	February 28, 2012	Don Cheadle, Jennifer Westfeldt	Kenny Chesney
Pros & Cons - J.K. Rowling Writing A Book For Adults, Freestyling With The Roots, Let Us Play With Your Look
599	February 29, 2012	Danny DeVito, Larry the Cable Guy	John Legend
Shout Outs, Wheel Of Game Shows

=== March ===
No.	Original release date	Guest(s)	Musical/entertainment guest(s)
600	March 1, 2012	Lindsay Lohan, Rob Riggle	Elvis Costello
Late Night Hashtags - #mycoworkeriscrazy, Pictionary - Fallon Vs. Lohan
601	March 2, 2012	Bruce Springsteen	Bruce Springsteen and the E Street Band
Neil Young And Bruce Springsteen Sing "Sexy And I Know It", Thank You Notes
602	March 19, 2012	January Jones, Jeffrey Tambor	Eric Church
Do Not Read List, Models & Buckets, Stump - Fallon Vs. Jones
603	March 20, 2012	Jon Hamm, Rachael Harris	Marcus Foster
Tebowie, Pros & Cons - March Madness, Water War - Fallon Vs. Hamm
604	March 21, 2012	Jennifer Lawrence, Chris Jericho	Wendy Liebman
Don't Quote Me, Put It On A Cracker, 3-Point Shootout - Fallon Vs. Lawrence
605	March 22, 2012	Jeff Musial, Candice Bergen, Fergie	Sleeper Agent
Late Night Hashtags - #imanidiot, Beer Pong - Fallon Vs. Bergen
606	March 23, 2012	Christian Slater, Bethenny Frankel	Dr. Dog
Thank You Notes, Karate Pinata, Marsh Madness - Fallon Vs. Slater
607	March 26, 2012	Sam Worthington, Casey Wilson	Swervedriver
Celebrity Whispers, Sing It Like You Mean It, Bar Shuffleboard - Fallon Vs. Worthington
608	March 27, 2012	Shaquille O'Neal, Lily Collins	Andrew Bird
Pros & Cons - Tim Tebow Coming To New York, Audience Voicemail, Hall Golf - Fallon Vs. O'Neal
609	March 28, 2012	Aziz Ansari, Ana Gasteyer, Wolfgang Puck	Diggy
Velvet Elvises, Late Night Charades - Fallon & Gasteyer Vs. Higgins & Ansari
610	March 29, 2012	Susan Sarandon, Adriana Lima	Patrizio Buanne
Clone By Charlie Sheen, Late Night Hashtags - #bestprankever, Darts Of Insanity, Brainstorm
611	March 30, 2012	Artie Lange, Greta Gerwig	Ed Sheeran
Thank You Notes

=== April ===
No.	Original release date	Guest(s)	Musical/entertainment guest(s)
612	April 2, 2012	Jeff Goldblum, Jim Breuer, Emeril Lagasse	Nicki Minaj
Freestyling With The Roots, How You Like Me Now
613	April 3, 2012	Regis Philbin, Rachel Dratch, Rossi Morreale	Dr. John featuring Dan Auerbach
Pros & Cons - Winning Mega Millions, Ready Set Flow, Brainstorm
614	April 4, 2012	Michael Bloomberg, Alyson Hannigan	Pegi Young and the Survivors
Late Night E-Cards, Audience Suggestion Box
615	April 5, 2012	Sofía Vergara, Judd Apatow	Walk the Moon
Late Night Hashtags - #springbreakmistake, Cupid's Arrow Show, Pictionary - Fallon Vs. Vergara
616	April 6, 2012	Guy Pearce, Eugene Levy	Future
Thank You Notes, Night News Now
617	April 9, 2012	Kevin Kline, Steve Harvey	Pulp
Do Not Read List, Name That Guy
618	April 10, 2012	Christina Applegate, Jane Goodall	White Rabbits
Pros & Cons - A Mitt Romney Presidency, Shout Outs, Watermelon Bowling - Fallon Vs. Applegate
619	April 11, 2012	Joel McHale, James Cameron	The Ting Tings
Animal Thoughts
620	April 12, 2012	Tina Fey, John Slattery, David Chang	SWV
Downton Sixbey - Episode 1, Catchphrase - Fallon Vs. Fey
621	April 13, 2012	Josh Brolin, Kiernan Shipka, Peter Farrelly	The Fray
Thank You Notes, Robot Voice
622	April 24, 2012	President Barack Obama	Dave Matthews
Jimmy Sings "Walk of Shame" With Dave Matthews, Slow Jam The News With Barack Obama
623	April 25, 2012	The Cast of 30 Rock, The Rev. Al Sharpton, Caroline Manzo	Poliça
Pros & Cons - President Obama Appearing On Late Night, Charades With The Cast of "30 Rock"
624	April 26, 2012	Jason Segel, Leelee Sobieski, CC Sabathia	The Lucas Brothers
Late Night Hashtags - #mydumbinjury, Competitive Spit Takes
625	April 27, 2012	Matthew Broderick, Serena Williams	Nick Lowe
Thank You Notes, Night News Now, Total Iceholes - Fallon Vs. Williams
626	April 30, 2012	Chris Evans, Allison Williams	Tom Morello featuring Ben Harper
Don't Quote Me, Audience Voicemails, Beer Pong - Fallon Vs. Evans

=== May ===
No.	Original release date	Guest(s)	Musical/entertainment guest(s)
627	May 1, 2012	Mark Ruffalo, Mario Batali, Steve and JoAnn Ward	Santigold
Pros & Cons - Newt Gingrich Dropping Out Of The Race, Models & Buckets
628	May 2, 2012	Amy Poehler, Daniel Dae Kim	Lady Antebellum
Celebrity Whispers
629	May 3, 2012	Martha Stewart, Carson Daly	Dave Waite
Late Night Hashtags - #mysuperpower, Wheel Of Carpet Samples, Ladder Golf - Fallon Vs. Stewart
630	May 4, 2012	Nathan Fillion, Taran Killam, Retta	Kathleen Edwards
Thank You Notes, Bow & Arrow Shootout - Fallon Vs. Fillion
631	May 7, 2012	Jennifer Connelly, Brian Wilson and Mike Love	The Beach Boys
On The Bright Side, Dance Your Hat & Gloves Off
632	May 8, 2012	Cameron Diaz, Michael Phelps	Of Monsters and Men
Pros & Cons - Being The Tanning Mom, Freestylin' With The Roots, Silent But Deadly - Fallon Vs. Diaz
633	May 9, 2012	Howard Stern, Brooklyn Decker, Giada De Laurentiis	Tank
He Said, She Said
634	May 10, 2012	Will Ferrell, Ellie Kemper	Awolnation
Late Night Hashtags - #thatsmymom, Guys With Tight Pants Skit
635	May 11, 2012	Stephen Colbert, Nick Cannon	Big K.R.I.T.
Thank You Notes, Night News Now, Bubble Soccer - Fallon & Lester Holt Vs. Colbert & David Gregory
636	May 14, 2012	Jeff Musial, Gordon Ramsay, Willie Nelson	Willie Nelson
Late Night E-Cards
637	May 15, 2012	Mariska Hargitay, Nick DiPaolo	Tenacious D
Pros & Cons - Time's Breastfeeding Cover, Wax On Wax Off, Pictionary - Fallon Vs. Hargitay
638	May 16, 2012	Taylor Kitsch, Tony Hale	Joe Machi
Audience Suggestion Box, Jelly Donut Shootout - Fallon Vs. Kitsch
639	May 17, 2012	Arsenio Hall, Maggie Q	Paul Weller
Late Night Hashtags - #mygraduationspeech, Karate Pinata, Brainstorm
640	May 18, 2012	Tom Selleck, Krysten Ritter	Garbage
Thank You Notes, Ready Set Flow
641	May 21, 2012	John Lithgow, Miranda Cosgrove	Slash featuring Myles Kennedy and the Conspirators
Late Night Perm Week - Day 1, Shout Outs, Charades - Fallon & Cosgrove Vs. Higgins & Lithgow
642	May 22, 2012	Anderson Cooper, John Mayer	The Afghan Whigs
Yankee Candles For Men, Late Night Perm Week - Day 2, Rock Paper Scissors Pie - Fallon Vs. Cooper
643	May 23, 2012	Edie Falco, Jim Gaffigan	Penn & Teller
Late Night Perm Week - Day 3, Battle Of The Instant Bands
644	May 24, 2012	Will Smith, Bill Paxton	Ronnie Dunn
Late Night Perm Week - Day 4, Downton Sixbey - Episode 2, Will Smith & Jimmy's 1920s Radio Show
645	May 25, 2012	Bill Hader, Kareem Abdul-Jabbar, Joshua Topolsky	Lambchop
Late Night Perm Week - Day 5, Thank You Notes

=== June ===
No.	Original release date	Guest(s)	Musical/entertainment guest(s)
646	June 4, 2012	Jason Schwartzman, Angie Harmon	Regina Spektor
Do Not Read List, Jimmy Sings "Little Pepper" With Jason Schwartzman, Beer Pong - Fallon Vs. Harmon
647	June 5, 2012	Michael Fassbender, Sean Parker, Shawn Fanning, Callie Thorne	The Walkmen
Pros & Cons - The Gay Green Lantern, Audience Voicemails
648	June 6, 2012	Julianne Hough, Colin Hanks	Bob Marley
On The Bright Side, New iPhone Apps, Ladder Golf - Fallon Vs. Hough
649	June 7, 2012	Chris Rock, Cat Deeley, Mario Gutierrez	Carly Rae Jepsen
Late Night Hashtags - #worstfamilytrip, Hallway Golf - Fallon Vs. Rock
650	June 8, 2012	Ben Stiller, Anthony Bourdain	Japandroids
Thank You Notes, Jacob's Patience
651	June 11, 2012	Keira Knightley, Eric Andre, Call of Duty: Black Ops II	Glen Hansard
Cell Phone Shootout, Jimmy Sings "French Girlfriend", "Call of Duty: Black Ops II" Demo
652	June 12, 2012	Maggie Gyllenhaal, Andy Cohen, Halo 4	Alejandro Escovedo
Pros & Cons - The NBA Finals, Tell Us What You Know, "Halo 4" Demo
653	June 13, 2012	Ice-T, Lena Dunham, The Last of Us (Bruce Straley and Neil Druckmann)	Norah Jones
Don't Quote Me, The Last of Us Demo
654	June 14, 2012	Paul Giamatti, Patrick J. Adams, Madden NFL 13	Dukes of September Rhythm Revue
Late Night Hashtags - #thatsmydad, The Evolution of Dad Dancing, "Madden NFL 13" Demo
655	June 15, 2012	Adam Sandler, RecordSetter, Wii U	Lil' Wyte
Thank You Notes, Adam Sandler's Father's Day Song, "Wii U" Demo
656	June 18, 2012	Joan Rivers, CM Punk	Fiona Apple
"Cupid's Arrow" Dating Service Videos, Freestyling With The Roots
657	June 19, 2012	Michelle Pfeiffer, Cedric the Entertainer	Dirty Projectors
Pros & Cons - The New Justin Bieber Album, Name That Guy, Beer Pong - Fallon Vs. Pfeiffer, Preach-Off - Fallon Vs. The Entertainer
658	June 20, 2012	Penélope Cruz, LeVar Burton, Kate Upton	Robert Glasper Experiment
Animal Thoughts, 50 Shades Of Grey Karaoke
659	June 21, 2012	Courteney Cox, Anthony Mackie	Kenny Chesney
Jimmy Fallon Vs. Justin Bieber, Late Night Hashtags - #itssohot, Catchphrase - Fallon Vs. Cox
660	June 22, 2012	Denis Leary, Emily Mortimer	fun.
Thank You Notes, Night News Now, Beer Air Hockey - Fallon Vs. Leary
661	June 25, 2012	Charlie Sheen, Beth Stern, Anthony Davis	Alabama Shakes
Late Night E-Cards, Batting Practice - Fallon Vs. Sheen, 3-Point Shootout - Fallon Vs. Davis
662	June 26, 2012	Emma Stone, Dwyane Wade, Larry Hagman, Patrick Duffy, Mark Sweet	Usher
Pros & Cons - Mitt Romney Being On Facebook, Charades - Fallon Vs. Stone
663	June 27, 2012	Salma Hayek, Aaron Sorkin, The Jacksons	LMFAO
Late Night Hashtags - #worstbbqever, The Spin Bike Song With LMFAO
664	June 28, 2012	Channing Tatum, Oliver Stone, Adam Levine	Maroon 5
Obama Expressions, Ew!
665	June 29, 2012	Blake Lively, Seth MacFarlane	Charlie Watts and the A, B, C & D of Boogie Woogie
Thank You Notes, Robot Voice, Pictionary - Fallon Vs. Lively

=== July ===
No.	Original release date	Guest(s)	Musical/entertainment guest(s)
666	July 9, 2012	Howie Mandel, Rose Byrne	Frank Ocean
Celebrity Whispers, Models & Buckets, Fallon & Byrne
667	July 10, 2012	Kelly Ripa, Kristen Johnston	Tom Waits
Pros & Cons - Summer Heat Waves, Rock Paper Scissors Pie - Fallon Vs. Ripa
668	July 11, 2012	Elijah Wood, Freida Pinto, James Murphy	Big Jay Oakerson
Audience Suggestion Box
669	July 12, 2012	Queen Latifah, Noah Wyle	Cloud Nothings
Late Night Hashtags - #mydumbsuperstition, Russell Brand Reads "Us Weekly", Other Voices
670	July 13, 2012	Anne Hathaway, Yoko Ono, Sean Lennon	Joe Jackson and the Bigger Band
Thank You Notes, Let Us Play With Your Look
671	July 16, 2012	Joseph Gordon-Levitt, Lorraine Bracco, Dave Arnold	Chris Brown
On The Bright Side, Do Not Read List
672	July 17, 2012	Heidi Klum, Chris Colfer	Best Coast
Pros & Cons - The Dark Knight Rises, Tell Us What You Know, Dance Charades - Fallon Vs. Klum
673	July 18, 2012	Jeff Musial, Jeff Daniels, Jenna Bush Hager	Refused
He Said She Said
674	July 19, 2012	Matt Lauer, Mike Tyson	Hot Chip
Late Night Hashtags - #fakedarkknightspoiler, Whack-A-Mole - Fallon Vs. Tyson
675	July 20, 2012	Kyra Sedgwick, Bob Odenkirk, Carla Hall	Juvenile
Thank You Notes, Speed Celebrity - Fallon Vs. Sedgwick
676	July 23, 2012	Matthew McConaughey, Carla Gugino	R. Kelly
Don't Quote Me, Karate Piñata, Cooler Scooter Race - Fallon Vs. McConaughey
677	July 24, 2012	Roseanne Barr, Nelly	Beach House
Pros & Cons - London Olympics, Password - Fallon Vs. Roseanne
678	July 25, 2012	Zach Galifianakis, Gina Gershon	Wilco
Late Night Hashtags - #notanolympian, Darts Of Insanity, Beer Pong - Fallon Vs. Gershon
679	July 26, 2012	Bill Cosby, Fred Willard	No Doubt
Audience Suggestion Box
680	July 27, 2012	Edward Norton, Olivia Munn	The Gaslight Anthem
Thank You Notes, Olympic Thoughts, Bubble Soccer - Fallon & Chris Mullin Vs. Norton & Paul Hamm

=== August ===
No.	Original release date	Guest(s)	Musical/entertainment guest(s)
681	August 13, 2012	Meredith Vieira, Kevin Durant, James Harden, Angela "Big Ang" Raiola	Needtobreathe
Freestylin' With The Roots, Catchphrase - Fallon Vs. Vieira
682	August 14, 2012	Leslie Mann, Dolph Lundgren	Grimes
Pros & Cons - Shark Week, Wheel Of Carpet Samples, Pictionary - Fallon Vs. Mann
683	August 15, 2012	Kathie Lee Gifford, T.I., Hope Solo	Godfrey
Said It And Re-Edit, Zoo Tunes - Fallon Vs. Gifford
684	August 16, 2012	Ricky Martin, Piper Perabo	Neon Hitch
Late Night Hashtags - #mycampaignpromise, Battle Of The Instant Dance Crews, General Hospital
685	August 17, 2012	Nancy Pelosi, Joe Jonas	2 Chainz
Thank You Notes, Night News Now, Rock Paper Scissors Pie - Fallon Vs. Jonas
686	August 20, 2012	Liv Tyler, Maria Sharapova	Yeasayer
Cupid's Arrow, Audience Google Search History, Star Makerz, Beer Pong - Fallon Vs. Sharapova
687	August 21, 2012	Tyra Banks, Jim Norton, Rob Burnett	ASAP Rocky
Pros & Cons - Returning To College, Brainstorm
688	August 22, 2012	Kristen Bell, John Oliver	Quicksand
Celebrity Whispers, Audience Suggestion Box, Ultimate Skee-Ball - Fallon Vs. Bell
689	August 23, 2012	Spike Lee, Mike Birbiglia, Michael Anthony	Trey Songz
Late Night Hashtags - #mycrazyteacher, Mitt Romney's Rom-Bomb Video Vlog Blog
690	August 24, 2012	Bradley Cooper, Ryan Lochte	Antibalas
Thank You Notes, Dance Your Hat & Gloves Off, Bow & Arrow Shootout - Fallon Vs. Lochte

=== September ===
No.	Original release date	Guest(s)	Musical/entertainment guest(s)
691	September 4, 2012	Kirsten Dunst, Gov. Chris Christie	Jason Mraz
Pros & Cons - 2012 NFL Season, Audience Voicemails, Taboo - Fallon Vs. Dunst
692	September 5, 2012	Ellen Barkin, Demi Lovato	Luke Bryan
Julian Castro DNC Speech, Do Not Read List, Pyramids - Fallon Vs. Barkin
693	September 6, 2012	Claire Danes, Jeff Probst	Calise Hawkins
Bill Clinton DNC Speech, Wax On Wax Off
694	September 7, 2012	Tom Brokaw, Guy Fieri, Bar Refaeli	Divine Fits
James Taylor Sings At DNC, Thank You Notes, Night News Now
695	September 10, 2012	Blake Shelton, Serena Williams, Andrew Rannells	David Byrne and St. Vincent
How You Like Me Now, Cooler Scooter Racing - Fallon Vs. Shelton
696	September 11, 2012	Woody Harrelson, Kenan Thompson, Tavi Gevinson	The Vaccines
Pros & Cons - The iPhone 5, Freestylin' With The Roots
697	September 12, 2012	Amy Adams, David Gregory, Rory McIlroy	Florence + the Machine
Audience Suggestion Box
698	September 13, 2012	Emma Watson, Tony Danza, Michael Symon	Brandy
Late Night Hashtags - #thatsmyroommate, Head Swap
699	September 14, 2012	Hugh Laurie, J. J. Abrams	Grizzly Bear
Thank You Notes, Tell Us What You Know, Cricket Home Run Derby - Fallon Vs. Laurie
700	September 17, 2012	Susan Sarandon, Karl Urban	Jim Hamilton
Picture Of The Day, Said It & Re-Edit, Models & Buckets, Charades - Fallon Vs. Sarandon
701	September 18, 2012	Jon Cryer, Taraji P. Henson	Nelly Furtado
Pros & Cons - Jay-Z & Beyonce's Obama Fundraiser, Name That Guy
702	September 19, 2012	Maya Rudolph, Dave Annable, Elmo	The Avett Brothers
Don't Quote Me
703	September 20, 2012	Piers Morgan, Michael Peña, Joshua Topolsky	Danny!
Late Night Hashtags - #iusedtothink, Mitt Romney's Rom-Bomb Video Vlog Blog
704	September 21, 2012	Jake Gyllenhaal, Penny Marshall	Bobby Womack ft. Damon Albarn and Richard Russell
Thank You Notes, Night News Now, Password - Fallon Vs. Marshall
705	September 25, 2012	Jerry Seinfeld, Anthony Anderson, Zach Cregger, Jesse Bradford	Two Door Cinema Club
Pros & Cons - Dancing With The Stars: All-Stars Edition, History Of TV Theme Songs
706	September 26, 2012	Ricky Gervais, Scott Speedman	Little Big Town
He Said She Said, Jacob's Patience
707	September 27, 2012	Sofía Vergara, Damian Lewis, Jeff Mauro	Local H
Lovitt, Lovitt, Lovitt, Late Night Hashtags - #oopsmybad, Beer Pong - Fallon Vs. Vergara
708	September 28, 2012	Ice-T, Justin Kirk	Hunter Hayes
Thank You Notes, Ultimate Mustache Fighter 10 - Yosemite Sam Vs. Ron Swanson, Long Pour - Fallon Vs. Kirk

=== October ===
No.	Original release date	Guest(s)	Musical/entertainment guest(s)
709	October 1, 2012	Liam Neeson, JoAnna Garcia Swisher	Matt & Kim
On The Bright Side, Audience Voicemails, Shuffleboard - Fallon Vs. Neeson
710	October 2, 2012	Anderson Cooper, Mamie Gummer	Kendrick Lamar
Mitt Romney Pre-Debate, Pros & Cons - The Presidential Debates, Freestylin' With The Roots
711	October 3, 2012	Martin Short, Logan Lerman	Morrissey
Celebrity Whispers, Karate Pinata
712	October 4, 2012	Daniel Craig, Archie Panjabi, Theresa Caputo	Animal Collective
Late Night Hashtags - #factcheck
713	October 5, 2012	Katie Couric, Jerry Trainor	Dom Irrera
Thank You Notes, Night News Now, Salad Bowl - Fallon Vs. Couric
714	October 8, 2012	Ben Affleck, Connie Britton, Cesar Millan	Sun Kil Moon
Do Not Play List
715	October 9, 2012	Christopher Walken, Pete Townshend	Jens Lekman
Pros & Cons - The Vice Presidential Debate, Mister Romney's Neighborhood
716	October 10, 2012	Tina Fey, Terry O'Quinn	Ellie Goulding
Audience Suggestion Box, Pictionary - Fallon Vs. Fey
717	October 11, 2012	Christina Applegate, Nick Offerman	Jackson Browne
Late Night Hashtags - #ithoughtiwascool, Darts Of Insanity, Catchphrase - Fallon Vs. Applegate
718	October 12, 2012	Salma Hayek Pinault, Andrew Lincoln, Peter Gabriel	Ben Gibbard
Romney & Obama Watch The VP Debate Together, Thank You Notes
719	October 22, 2012	Gerard Butler, Madeleine Stowe, Felix Baumgartner	Wu-Tang Clan
Obama Expressions, Fallon & Ghostface Vs. Butler & RZA
720	October 23, 2012	Tom Hanks, Victoria Justice, Jamie-Lynn Sigler	Aimee Mann
Romney & Obama's Post-Debate Hang Session, Pros & Cons - The World Series, Tom Hanks Performs Slam Poem About "Full House"
721	October 24, 2012	Rod Stewart, Jennifer Morrison	Chris D'Elia
Night News Now
722	October 25, 2012	Julianna Margulies, Dan Patrick	Gary Clark, Jr.
Late Night Hashtags - #halloweendisaster, Dance Your Hat & Gloves Off, Brainstorm
723	October 26, 2012	Ethan Hawke, James Van Der Beek, Deron Williams	The xx
Thank You Notes, Battle Of The Instant Dance Crews
724	October 29, 2012	Seth Meyers, Padma Lakshmi, Robert Zemeckis	Imagine Dragons
Note: This episode was filmed without an audience in preparation for Hurricane Sandy, Mets Bucket Hat Guy
725	October 30, 2012	Donald Trump, Andy Cohen	Trey Anastasio
Late Night Instagram - #DIYhalloweencostumes, Video Vision - Halloween
726	October 31, 2012	Ryan Seacrest, Bobby Cannavale	Tom Shillue
Audience Suggestion Box

=== November ===
No.	Original release date	Guest(s)	Musical/entertainment guest(s)
727	November 1, 2012	Louis C.K., RZA, David Chang	Ne-Yo
Late Night Hashtags - #ifiwerepresident, Robot Voice
728	November 2, 2012	Christina Aguilera, Colin Quinn, Joshua Topolsky	Joey Bada$$
Thank You Notes; Jimmy, Christina Aguilera And The Roots Sing "Your Body"
729	November 5, 2012	Jason Sudeikis, Keegan-Michael Key, Jordan Peele	RNDM
If Puppies Could Vote, Karate Piñata, Egg Russian Roulette - Fallon Vs. Sudeikis
730	November 7, 2012	Kristen Stewart, Pharrell, The Amazing Kreskin	Now, Now
Mitt Romney's Concession Call To Obama, Giant Quarters - Fallon Vs. Stewart
731	November 8, 2012	Robert Pattinson, Carrie Underwood	Carrie Underwood
Late Night Hashtags - #igotcaught, Water War - Fallon Vs. Pattinson, Jimmy & Carrie Underwood Do Country Versions Of Rap Songs
732	November 9, 2012	Taylor Lautner, Kevin Pollak	The Wallflowers
Thank You Notes, Freestylin' With The Roots, Alligator Race - Fallon Vs. Lautner
733	November 12, 2012	Chelsea Handler, Charlie Cox	Meek Mill
Wax On Wax Off, Password - Fallon Vs. Handler
734	November 13, 2012	Sally Field, Finesse Mitchell, Elon Musk	Lee Brice
Pros & Cons - Legalizing Marijuana, Cupid's Arrow Live
735	November 14, 2012	Chris Tucker, Kellan Lutz, Jonathan Becker	Electric Guest
Animal Thoughts, Let Us Play With Your Look: Lindsay Lohan Edition
736	November 15, 2012	Katie Holmes, Jeff Bezos	Russell Peters
Late Night Hashtags - #faketwilightspoilers, First Drafts Of Rock: 'Old Times Rock & Roll' By Bob Seger, Charades - Fallon Vs. Holmes
737	November 16, 2012	Helen Mirren, Carson Daly, Reggie Fils-Aimé	Miguel
Thank You Notes, Mirren Mirren
738	November 19, 2012	Zooey Deschanel, Tony Bennett	Zac Brown Band
Do Not Read List, Night News Now
739	November 20, 2012	Bob Costas, Miranda Cosgrove, Pitbull	Pitbull
Pros & Cons - Macy's Thanksgiving Day Parade, Audience Suggestion Box
740	November 21, 2012	Amy Poehler, Alicia Keys	Alicia Keys
Late Night Hashtags - #newthanksgivingsongs, Robert Is Bothered, Alicia Keys Sings "Gummi Bears" Theme Song, Catchphrase - Fallon Vs. Poehler
741	November 22, 2012	Rashida Jones, Artie Lange & Nick DiPaolo, Martha Stewart	N/A
Thank You Notes

=== December ===
No.	Original release date	Guest(s)	Musical/entertainment guest(s)
742	December 3, 2012	Keira Knightley, Dave Matthews	Dave Matthews Band
Don't Quote Me, Celebrity Whispers, Musical Instrument Game - Fallon & Michael Bublé Vs. Knightly & Matthews
743	December 4, 2012	Michael Strahan, Bonnie Raitt	Bonnie Raitt
Pons & Cons - The Rockefeller Center Christmas Tree, Classroom Instruments - "All I Want for Christmas Is You", Ew!
744	December 5, 2012	Tracy Morgan, Richard Lewis, Tyler Florence	Game
He Said She Said, Twas The Night Before Christmas With Tracy Morgan
745	December 6, 2012	Tom Selleck, Richard Branson	Tanlines
Michael Buble Debuts New All-Humming Christmas Album, 12 Days Of Christmas Sweaters Day 12, Wheel Of Carpet Samples
746	December 7, 2012	Elijah Wood, Jesse Tyler Ferguson	Big Boi featuring Little Dragon
Thank You Notes, 12 Days Of Christmas Sweaters Day 11, Night News Now, Sticky Balls - Fallon Vs. Wood
747	December 10, 2012	Laura Linney, Dave Attell	Solange
On The Bright Side, 12 Days Of Christmas Sweaters Day 10, Dance Your Hat & Gloves Off
748	December 11, 2012	Anne Hathaway, Roger Waters, Robert Smigel	Macklemore & Ryan Lewis
Pros & Cons - Barbara Walters' 10 Most Fascinating People, 12 Days Of Christmas Sweaters Day 9, Mad Libs Christmas Carols
749	December 12, 2012	Naomi Watts, Hugh Bonneville	Florida Georgia Line
12 Days Of Christmas Sweaters Day 8, Audience Suggestion Box, Beer Pong - Fallon Vs. Watts
750	December 13, 2012	Martin Short, Billy Joel, John Cena	Neal Brennan
Late Night Hashtags - #newholidaysongs, 12 Days Of Christmas Sweaters Day 7
751	December 14, 2012	RecordSetter, Christoph Waltz, Amy Sedaris	Martha Wainwright
Thank You Notes, 12 Days Of Christmas Sweaters Day 6
752	December 17, 2012	Ewan McGregor, Charles Grodin, Ask This Old House	Dave Matthews Band
12 Days Of Christmas Sweaters Day 5, Late Night Stocking Stuffers, True Facts Of Truth
753	December 18, 2012	Tom Cruise, Judd Apatow	Trans-Siberian Orchestra
12 Days Of Christmas Sweaters Day 4, Late Night Instagrams - #badgift, Late Night Stocking Stuffers, Water War - Fallon Vs. Cruise
754	December 19, 2012	Jeff Musial, Ed Burns, Victor Cruz	Backstreet Boys
12 Days Of Christmas Sweaters Day 3, Late Night Stocking Stuffers, Giant Quarters - Fallon Vs. Burns
755	December 20, 2012	Billy Crystal, Tyson Chandler	Cee Lo Green
12 Days Of Christmas Sweaters Day 2, Late Night Hashtags - #weirdholidaytradition, Late Night Stocking Stuffers, "Who's On First?": The Sequel, 3-Point Shootout - Fallon Vs. Chandler
756	December 21, 2012	Paul Rudd, Mario Batali	Rod Stewart
12 Days Of Christmas Sweaters Day 1, Thank You Notes, Late Night Stocking Stuffers
