= Matt Toka =

American musician

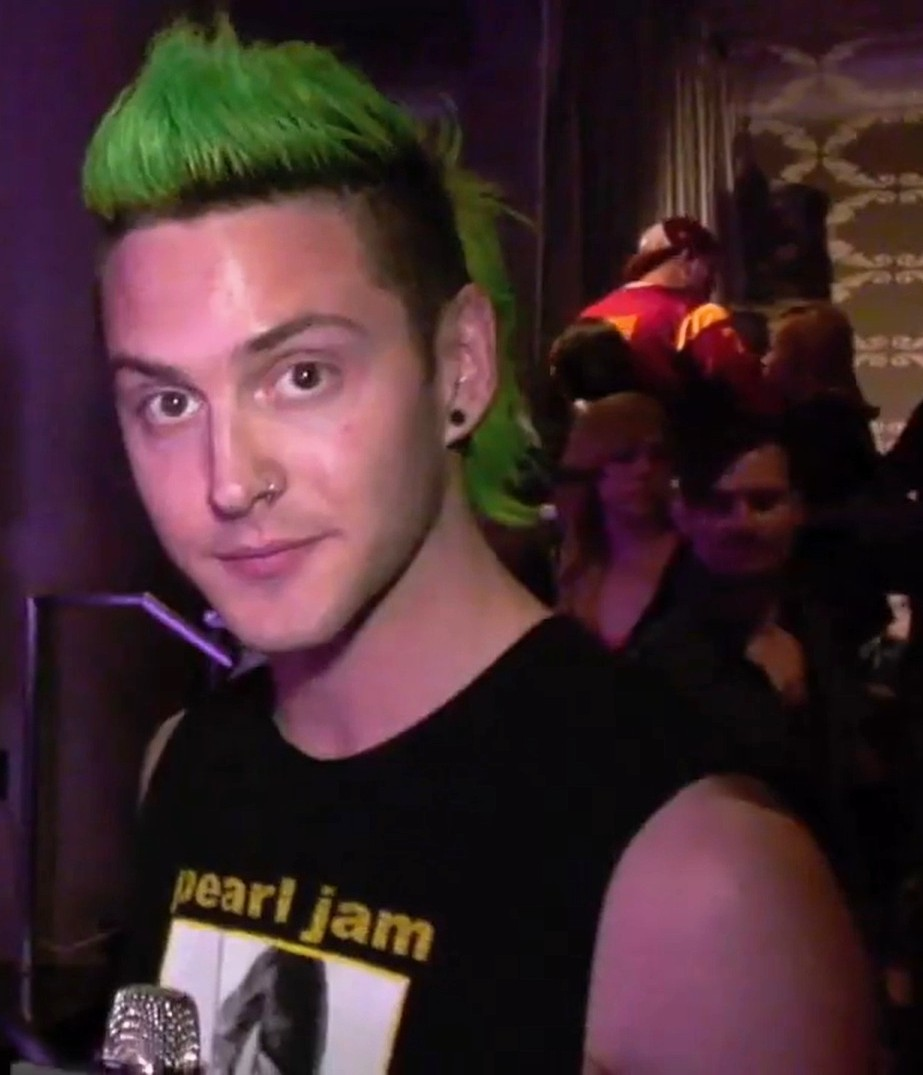
- Toka in 2012

Background information
- Born: Youngstown, Ohio, United States
- Genres: Alternative rock, punk rock, pop punk
- Occupations: Singer-songwriter, musician
- Instruments: Vocals, guitar, piano, bass
- Years active: 2004–2013; 2017–present
- Website: matt-toka.com

Matt Toka (stage name) is an American musician. He was lead singer of the band Cherry Monroe.

In 2012, Matt Toka released a self-titled EP produced by Rob Cavallo. Matt Toka followed the release going on Warped Tour and Bamboozle Festival.

Toka has also toured with Falling in Reverse, All American Rejects, and Breathe Carolina.
