= Cherry Monroe =

American alternative rock band

- Origin: Youngstown, Ohio, USA
- Genres: Alternative rock
- Years active: 2004–2006
- Label: Universal Records
- Past members: Matt Toka; Jason Levis; Ryan Harris; Frankie Bennett; Dave Saltzman

Cherry Monroe is a band originating from Youngstown, Ohio and Pittsburgh, PA. They made their way into the American pop music industry with their debut single "Satellites" in July 2005, reaching No. 85 on the Billboard Hot 100.

== History ==
The band formed in 2004 with Matt Toka (lead), Jason Levis (drums), David Saltman (bass), and Ryan Harris (guitar). Another guitarist, Frankie Bennett, joined later. The band was initially named The Velvet Idols, but was made to be re-named Cherry Monroe by their first record label. Shortly afterwards the band was signed to Universal Records.

In July 2006, the label dropped the band and that lead vocalist Matt Toka to announce his departure from the band to pursue a solo music career.

In 2012, Matt Toka released a self-titled album produced by Rob Cavallo. He had been managed by record executive Scooter Braun. Matt Toka followed the release by going on Warped Tour and Bamboozle Festival. He has also toured with Falling in Reverse, All American Rejects, and Breathe Carolina.

== Discography ==
- Cherry Monroe (2004)
- The Good, the Bad, and the Beautiful (2005)
