= Mark Sweet =

American hypnotherapist, comedian, magician

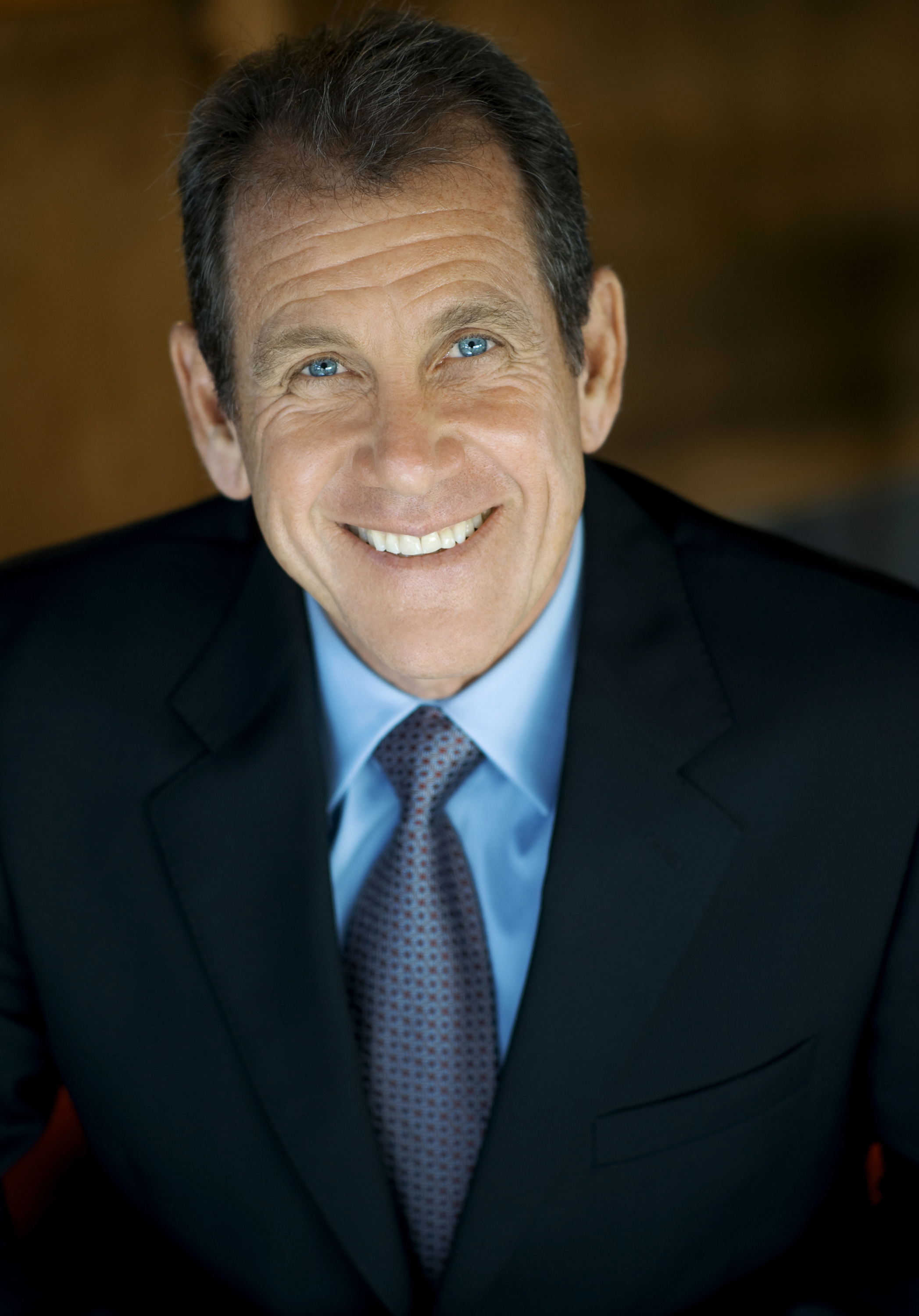
- Born: September 20, 1951 (age 75); Detroit, MI, U.S.
- Occupations: American hypnotherapist, comedian, magician and host

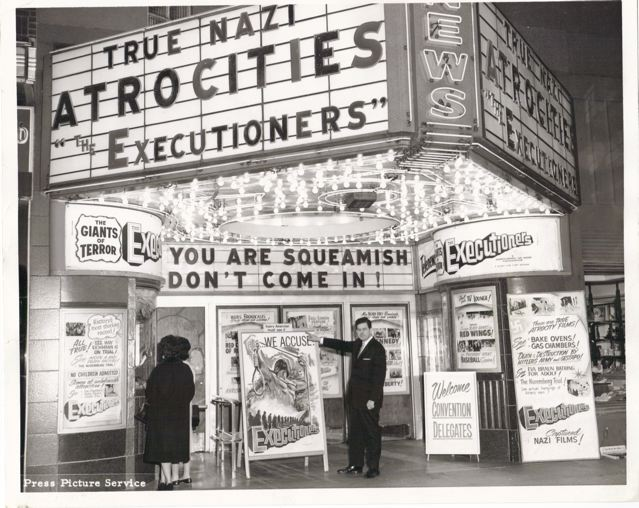
Fred Sweet in front of the Telenews Theater in Detroit.

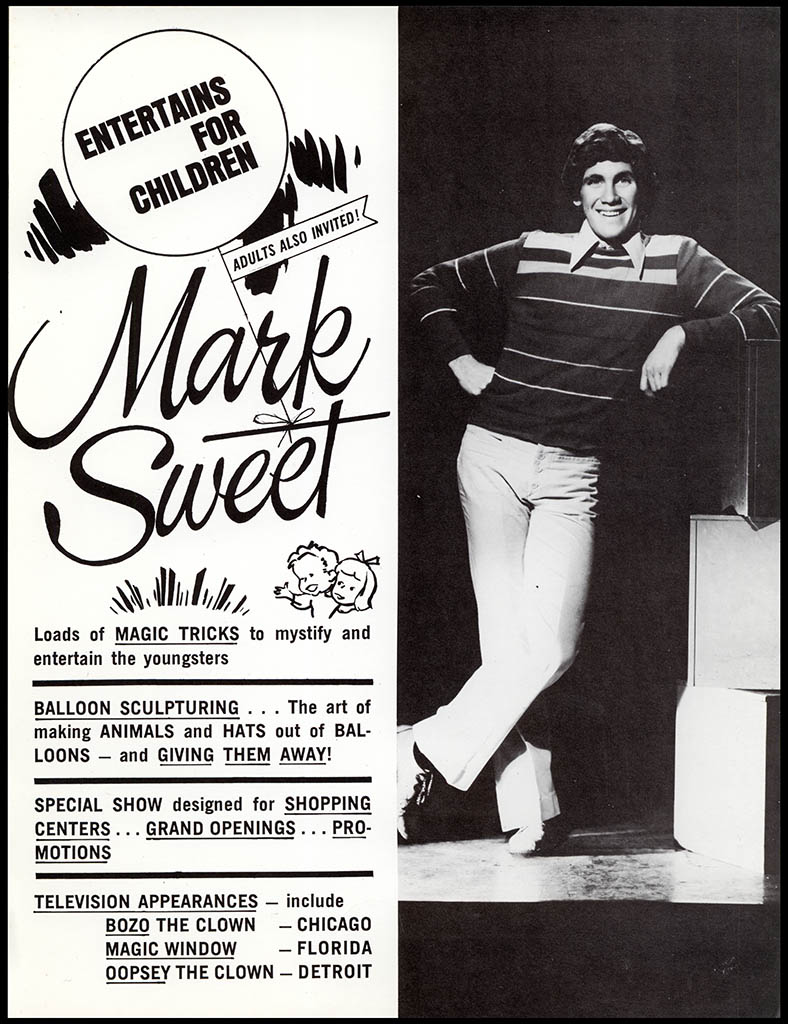
Mark Sweet early publicity photo.

Mark Sweet is an American hypnotherapist, comedian, magician and host.

== Early life and education ==
Mark Sweet was born on September 20, 1951, in Detroit, Michigan. His father, Fred Sweet, used to manage the TeleNews movie theater in downtown Detroit.' A few blocks away was the magic store Fox Fun 'N Magic, owned by Roy Kissell. Although Sweet was only five years old, Roy began teaching him magic and Sweet became his protégé. On weekends, Sweet did shows in the family's garage for the neighborhood children. Sweet's mother Fay worked for Detroit pediatricians and knew when all the children's birthdays were, so Sweet performed magic shows at children's birthday parties every weekend, which led to larger bookings.

At the age of 16, Sweet landed his first talent agents, Al Rice and John Bonino at Gail & Rice in Detroit.

== Career ==
Sweet's first gig was at the Detroit Boat Club on Belle Isle. This launched a 25-year career performing magic and comedy for General Motors. In 1972, a fellow magician introduced Sweet to his trade show agent, who got him a meeting with the Willy Wonka company, and Sweet ended up performing as Willy Wonka and acting as their spokesperson for 23 years.

Sweet and his wife Julie moved to Los Angeles in 1981, and Sweet was soon doing warm-up for studio audiences. Garry Shandling requested Sweet to warm up It's Garry Shandling's Show, which he did for six years. In addition, Jerry Van Dyke, whom Sweet had met in the 1970s, introduced him to Barry Kemp, the creator of Newhart and Coach. Sweet went on to warm up audiences at Coach for nine years, and has done warm-up for some of the biggest sitcoms on yelevision, including: Roseanne; Cheers; The Larry Sanders Show; Suddenly Susan; Everybody Loves Raymond; Yes, Dear; Mike & Molly; Dharma & Greg; According to Jim; Reba; The Big Bang Theory; and Two and a Half Men.

Sweet's warm-up accomplishments are noted in former NBC President of Entertainment Warren Littlefield's book Top of the Rock. Littlefield calls Sweet "The king of multi-camera comedy audience warm-up. Over four thousand episodes from Cheers to Mike & Molly."

== Hypnotherapy ==
Sweet became interested in hypnosis at an early age, and is now a certified clinical hypnotherapist. He regularly combines his talent for stand-up comedy and hypnosis in a comedy hypnotism routine, which he has performed on such shows as Late Night With Jimmy Fallon and The Jamie Kennedy Experiment. Sweet also regularly performs at The Ice House in Pasadena.
