= Ahmir (band) =

American band, founded 2006

Background information
- Origin: Boston, MA
- Genre: R&B
- Years active: 2006–????
- Labels: Robbins Entertainment, Manhattan Recording
- Members: Mr. Jones; Sing-Sing; Big Mike; KC Chadwick M
- Past members: SING (Formerly Known As) 'Sing-Sing'
- Website: ahmirmusic.net

Ahmir is a group of four male R&B/pop singers based out of Boston, Massachusetts. The group is mainly known for their YouTube channel, with over one hundred million views, they are one of the most viewed R&B groups on YouTube. The band was originally named One Love, but changed to Ahmir for trademark reasons.

== History ==
=== Formation ===
The band formed in 2002 in Boston under the name "One Luv" (sometimes stylized as "1Luv"). Before the bands' formation, Mr. Jones, the only member originally from Boston, was a Northeastern University graduate, who honed his craft by singing in church choirs. Eventually he met Big Mike, a New York City native and a previous member of the Boys Choir of Harlem, and was at Boston University majoring in music. They decided to put together a male R&B vocal group. KC, who was raised in Rochester, New York, had just relocated to Boston in hopes of chasing his dream. Sing-Sing, a Philadelphia native, had developed his skills at the Philadelphia High School for the Creative and Performing Arts, which led to him attending Berklee College of Music where he eventually was approached to become the final member of the band.

A few years later, they were discovered by Michael Cheung, who became their manager and released their first single in 2006 titled "Welcome To My Party", from their album The Gift, under the new band name Ahmir. The song peaked at #82 on the Billboard Hot R&B/Hip-Hop Songs chart. And also charted at #19 on the R&B Singles of the Year. Their breakout single from the album, "The Wedding Song", went viral over the Internet. The Gift won an Urban Music Award in New England, USA for Best Album and the group won for Best R&B Group.

The group performed as contestants on the second season of NBC's America's Got Talent, with celebrity judge Sharon Osbourne considering them as a "class act"

In 2010, after years of attempting to find a record label, they were signed to Robbins Entertainment RED/Sony Music and a few years later they released the single "WAR", which aired on the Top 40 spot from various radio stations. In 2013, the group performed "WAR" on The Tonight Show Starring Jimmy Fallon.

Ahmir was the winner on the YouTube music show Best Cover Ever on an episode featuring Demi Lovato. The group was awarded with a special performance of "Stone Cold" with Demi Lovato.

In 2017, Ahmir released their self titled album Ahmir.

=== A new direction ===
Ahmir made an announcement on their YouTube channel on May 17, 2018, that Sing-Sing would be moving on from the band. He stated:

In life, there are several points where you look at where you are and stop to evaluate and try to figure out where you've been and where you wanna go. And after some evaluation, I've enjoyed being a member of the group forever...and I figured at this time I would like to spend a little time investing in myself as an artist, and make no mistake these are my guys, these are my brothers in harmony. We made so many stories, so many memories, so much music and we're glad that you've all [the fans] been part of that. Thank you all for everything. The love and support is always going to be there, and this is by no means anything that is so sad because we're all continuing to make some wonderful music from this point, and we just wanted to take some time to share that.

The group stated that they had not disbanded, and would continue as a trio or possibly seek a new member in the future, and hoped fans would continue to support.

=== Solo and collaborative ventures ===
Months after the group started its hiatus, Mr. Jones released two music videos for singles on various online streaming platforms ("Demolition Man" & "Twilight Zone - Rest In Power"), along with participating in a YouTube freestyle challenge produced by Abstract Minor. He wrote for New Edition/BBD member Mike Bivins' Sporty Rich Enterprises/Apparel album titled Stay Fly and also provided the vocals, singing the comedic jingle for the "Sporty Rich ~~National~~ 'Bangled' Anthem". In late 2020, he began collaborating with brother Chilla Jones of SMACK/URL fame as a rap/singing duo, Jones Ink, releasing their most popular song in 2021 with Method Man titled "Day Ones", the video for which went viral with over 700,000 views. In 2022 the duo also released multiple independent singles including "Apart", "Voodoo", "Cuban Cigars" and "Wins on Wins".

SING has continued his independent solo career by releasing an EP in 2021 titled Dirty Truth, with singles such as "I Need You" and "Traveling Mercies" as well as a standalone single in 2022 "The World Will Know Your Name".

As of 2022, there have been no updates and plans of Ahmir reuniting or recording new material.

== Albums ==
- The Gift - 2007
- The Best Ahmir Love Songs - 2008
- The Covers Collection Vol. 1 - 2009
- The Covers Collection Vol. 2 - 2009
- The Covers Collection - Special Edition (Japan only) - 2011
- The Covers Collection Vol. 2 - Special Edition (Japan only) - 2012
- The Covers Collection Vol. 3 - Special Edition (Japan only) - 2012
- The Covers Collection Vol. 3.5 - Wedding Collection (Japan only) - 2013
- The Covers Collection Vol. 4 - Special Edition (Japan only) - 2013
- Summer Collection (Japan only) - 2014
- The Covers Collection Vol. 5 - Special Edition (Japan only) - 2014
- The Covers Collection Vol. 6 - Special Edition (Japan only) - 2015
- Single "War" - 2012
- The Covers Collection Vol. 7 - Special Edition (Japan only) - 2016
- The Covers Collection Vol. 8 - Special Edition (Japan only) - 2017
- Ahmir - 2017
